= Francis =

Francis may refer to:

== People and characters ==
- Pope Francis (1936–2025), head of the Catholic Church from 2013 to 2025
- Francis (given name), including a list of people and fictional characters
- Francis (surname)

== Places ==
- Rural Municipality of Francis No. 127, Saskatchewan, Canada
- Francis, Saskatchewan, Canada
  - Francis (electoral district)
- Francis, Nebraska, USA
- Francis Township, Holt County, Nebraska, USA
- Francis, Oklahoma, USA
- Francis, Utah, USA

== Arts, entertainment, media ==
- Francis (film), 1950, the first of the Francis the Talking Mule comedies
- Francis, a 1983 play by Julian Mitchell
- Francis (band), a Sweden-based folk band

== Other uses ==
- FRANCIS, a bibliographic database
- Francis (1793), an Australian colonial schooner
- Francis turbine, a type of water turbine

== See also ==
- Saint Francis (disambiguation)
- Francis I (disambiguation)
- Francis II (disambiguation)
- Francis III (disambiguation)
- Francis IV (disambiguation)
- Francis V (disambiguation)
- Francis VI
- Francies, a surname, including a list of people with the name
- Francisco (disambiguation)
- Franciscus, a given name, including a list of people with the name
- Francesco, a given name, including a list of people with the name
- Fraunceys, a surname, including a list of people with the name
- Franchise (disambiguation)
- Franci (disambiguation)
- Frank (disambiguation)
