= François =

Given name and surname

- Pronunciation: French: [fʁɑ̃swa] English: /ˈfrɒ̃swɑː/, /frɒ̃ˈswɑː/, US also /frænˈswɑː/, /ˈfrænswɑː/
- Gender: Male

Origin
- Language: French

Other names
- Related names: Françoise, Francis, Francesco, Franciscus, Francisco, Franciszek, Francesc, Ferenc, Frank, Franco, Franz, Frans, Franklin

François (French: [fʁɑ̃swa]) is a French masculine given name and surname, equivalent to the English name Francis.

== People with the given name ==
- François Abadie (1930–2001), French politician
- François Abou Mokh (1921–2006), Syrian bishop
- François Abraha (1918–2000), Ethiopian Catholic bishop
- François Amoudruz (1926–2020), French resistance fighter
- François-Marie Arouet (better known as Voltaire; 1694–1778), French Enlightenment writer, historian, and philosopher
- Francois Barrie (1943 or 1944–2023), Dominican politician
- François Beauchemin (born 1980), Canadian ice hockey player for the Anaheim Ducks
- François Blanc (1806–1877), French entrepreneur and operator of casinos
- François Bonlieu (1937–1973), French alpine skier
- François Cevert (1944–1973), French racing driver
- François Chau (born 1959), Cambodian American actor
- François Clemmons (born 1945), American singer and actor
- François Corbier (1944–2018), French television presenter and songwriter
- François Coty (1874–1934), French perfumer
- François Coulomb the Elder (1654–1717), French naval architect
- François Coulomb the Younger (1691–1751), French naval architect
- François Couperin (1668–1733), French Baroque composer, keyboardist
- François Couturier (born 1950), French jazz pianist
- François Henricus Anthonie van Dixhoorn (born 1948), Dutch poet
- François de Klerk (born 1991), South African rugby player
- François "Faf" du Plessis (born 1984), South African cricketer
- François Englert (1932–2026), Belgian particle physicist who in 2013 shared the Nobel Prize with Peter Higgs
- François Ewald (born 1946), French philosopher
- François Feldman (born 1958), French singer
- François Gautier (born 1950), French journalist
- François Gernigon (born 1961), French politician
- François Jackman, Barbadian diplomat
- François Lalande (1930–2020), French actor
- François Lapointe (politician) (born 1971), Canadian politician
- François Lapointe (racewalker) (born 1961), Canadian racewalker
- François Laroque (born 1948), French academic, translator and Shakespeare specialist
- François Lavoie (born 1993), Canadian ten-pin bowler
- François Leterrier (1929–2020), French film director and actor
- François Lionet (born 1963), French computer programmer
- François Pienaar (born 1965), South African rugby player
- François Pinault (born 1936), French billionaire
- François-Henri Pinault (born 1962), French billionaire
- François Prelati, Italian cleric and alchemist
- François Quesnay (1694–1774), French economist
- François Rabbath (born 1931), French double-bass player and composer
- François Rabelais (died 1553), French Renaissance writer, doctor and humanist
- François-Xavier Roth (born 1971), French conductor
- François Rozenthal (born 1975), French ice hockey player
- François Ruffin (born 1975), French journalist, filmmaker, author and politician
- François Sagat (born 1979), French model and porn actor
- François van 't Sant (1883–1966), Dutch spy and police commissioner
- François Steyn (born 1987), South African rugby player
- François Vincent Henri Antoine de Stuers (1792–1881), Dutch general
- François Tracanelli (born 1951), French pole vaulter
- François Trinh-Duc (born 1986), French rugby player
- François Truffaut (1932–1984), French film director, screenwriter, producer, actor and film critic
- François Vérove (1962–2021), French serial killer
- François Vidal (1832–1911), French poet
- François Villon (c. 1431–1463), French poet and outlaw

=== Heads of state and government ===
==== France ====
- Francis I of France (1494–1547), King of France (r. 1515–1547), known as "the Father and Restorer of Letters"
- Francis II of France (1554–1560), King of France and King consort of Scots (r. 1558–1560), known as the husband of Mary Stuart, Queen of Scots
- François Fillon (born 1954), Prime Minister of France 2007–2012
- François Hollande (born 1954), President of France 2012–2017
- François Mitterrand (1916–1996), President of France 1981–1995

==== Haiti ====
- François Denys Légitime (1841–1935), President of Haiti from 1888 to 1889
- François Duvalier (1907–1971), President of Haiti from 1957 to 1971

=== Fictional characters ===
- Francois Turbot, a recurring character in the Canadian television series PAW Patrol

=== Further disambiguation ===
- François Aubry (disambiguation), several people
- François Baby (disambiguation), several people
- François Boucher (disambiguation), several people
- François Caron (disambiguation), several people
- François Dominique (disambiguation), several people
- François Duval (disambiguation), several people
- François Fournier (disambiguation), several people

== People with the surname ==
- Abraham François (born 1977), Canadian soccer player
- Alexandre François, French linguist
- André François (1915–2005), Hungarian-born French cartoonist
- Christian Francois (born 1985), volleyball player from Trinidad and Tobago
- Claude François (1939–1978), French pop singer
- Déborah François (born 1987), Belgian actress
- Deondre Francois (born 1997), Haitian-born American football player
- Elvis Francois (born 1985), American orthopedic surgeon and singer
- Francisco François, Mauritian politician
- Guillaume François (born 1990), Belgian professional footballer
- Hermann von François (1856–1933), German general during WW1
- Hunter J. Francois (1924–2014), Saint Lucian politician
- Jacques François (1920–2003), French actor
- Julien François (born 1979), French footballer
- Kendall Francois (1971–2014), serial killer from Poughkeepsie, New York
- Mark François (born 1965), British politician
- Tony François (born 1971), Mauritian international footballer

== See also ==
- "Citizen François", a caricatural personification of Revolutionary France by James Gillray
- François, Deux-Sèvres, a municipality in the Poitou-Charentes region, France
- Francois, Newfoundland and Labrador, a settlement in Canada
- Le François, a town on the island of Martinique, France
- Lefrançois, a French surname
- Saint-François (disambiguation)
- Frànçois & the Atlas Mountains
- françois (language) (IPA [frãˈs(w)ɛ]), a common name describing the French language before the reform of French orthography in 1835.
