= Franciscus =

- Gender: masculine

Origin
- Origin: Latin

Other names
- Related names: Franziskus, Francis, Francisco, François, Françoise, Franciszek, Francesco, Francesc, Ferenc, Frank, Franco, Franz, Frans, Franklin

Franciscus is a Latin masculine given name, originally an epithet meaning "the Franks". It is also used as a surname. There are many related names.

== Etymology and meanings ==
The Medieval Latin word Francus or Franciscus, meant "belonging to the people of the Franks", a Germanic people of central Europe. The Franks derived their tribal name from a type of throwing axe that they used as a weapon during the early Middle Ages. The Franks were the only tribe who had rights of free citizens in the Middle Ages, so the term frank came to mean a free, sincere, or true. The word came from the Germanic word frankô (or franka), which referred to a weapon like a javelin or spear. Before this, in Proto-Germanic the word was sahsą, meaning "knife" or "dagger".

== Francis of Assisi ==
It was applied to Saint Francis of Assisi (1181/82–1226). Francis had been baptized Giovanni (John); his father was Italian and his mother Provençale (at the time not considered French); his father was on business in France when he was born, and when he returned to Assisi, he began to call his son by the nickname Francesco, in the opinion of G. K. Chesterton possibly because out of a general enthusiasm for all things French, or because of his commercial success in France.

After the canonization of Saint Francis of Assisi in 1228, the custom of naming children after saints led to the popularisation of Franciscus as a given name. In the vernaculars of western Europe, the name diversified into the forms Francesco (Italian), Francisco (Spanish and Portuguese), Francesc (Catalan), François (Old French Franceis, whence English Francis), Franz (German, whence Hungarian Ferenc, Scandinavian and Dutch Frans); besides Frans, the Latin form remains commonly given in Dutch.

== Modern usage ==
Franciscus may serve as the Latinisation of any of these given names; conversely, Francis may serve as the anglicisation of anyone called Franciscus.

== People ==
=== Chosen name ===
- Pope Franciscus (1936-2025, papal name chosen in 2013 by Jorge Mario Bergoglio)

=== Latinized name ===
- Franciscus Assisiensis (1181/2–1226), Saint Francis of Assisi
- Franciscus Accursius (Francesco d'Accorso; 1225–1293), Italian lawyer
- Franciscus de Mayronis (François de Meyronnes; c.1280–1328), French scholastic philosopher
- Franciscus de Marchia (Francesco della Marca; c.1290–c.1344), Italian Franciscan theologian and philosopher
- Franciscus de Florentia (Francesco Landini; c.1330–1397), Italian composer, organist, singer, poet and instrument maker
- Franciscus Monachus (Frans Smunck; c.1490–1565), Brabantian cartographer
- Franciscus Irenicus (Franz Friedlieb; 1494–1553), German humanist and historian
- Franciscus Bossinensis (fl. 1509–1511), possibly Bosnian lutenist-composer working in Venice
- Franciscus Stancarus (Francesco Stancaro; 1501–1574), Italian Catholic priest, theologian, and Protestant convert
- Franciscus Titelmannus (Frans Titelmans; 1502–1537), Flemish Franciscan scholar
- Franciscus Sonnius (Frans van de Velde; 1507–1576), Dutch theologian and bishop
- Franciscus Duarenus (François Douaren; 1509–1559), French jurist and professor of law
- Franciscus Portus (Φραγκίσκος Πόρτος; 1511–1581), Greek-Italian Renaissance humanist and classical scholar.
- Franciscus Dryander (Francisco de Enzinas; 1518–1552), Spanish classical scholar, translator and Protestant apologist
- Franciscus Londariti (Φραγκίσκος Λεονταρίτης; 1518–1572), Crete-born Venetian composer
- Franciscus Balduinus (François Baudouin; 1520–1573), French jurist, Christian controversialist and historian
- Franciscus Patricius (Francesco Patrizi; 1529–1597), Venetian philosopher
- Franciscus Costerus (Frans de Costere; 1532–1619), Brabantian Jesuit, theologian and author
- Franciscus Barocius (Francesco Barozzi; 1537–1604), Italian mathematician, astronomer and humanist
- Franciscus Raphelengius (Frans van Ravelingen; 1539–1597), Flemish-born Dutch scholar, printer and bookseller
- Franciscus Vieta (François Viète; 1540–1603), French mathematician
- Franciscus Junius (the elder) (François du Jon; 1545–1602), Huguenot scholar and theologian
- Franciscus Haraeus (Frans Verhaer; 1555–1631), Netherlandish theologian, historian, and cartographer
- Franciscus Gomarus (François Gomaer; 1563–1641), Dutch theologian
- Franciscus Aguilonius (François d'Aguilon; 1567–1617), Belgian Jesuit mathematician, physicist and architect
- Franciscus Dousa (Frans van der Does; 1577–1630), Dutch classical scholar
- Franciscus Quaresmius (Francisco Quaresmio; 1583–1650), Italian writer and Orientalist
- Franciscus Burgersdicius (Franck Burgersdijk; 1590–1635), Dutch logician
- Franciscus Junius (the younger) (1591–1677), Huguenot philologist and art historian
- Franciscus Linus (Francis Line; 1595–1675), English-born Jesuit priest and scientist
- Franciscus Blancus (Frang Bardhi; 1606–1643), Albanian bishop and author
- Franciscus Sylvius (Franz de le Boë 1614–1672), Dutch physician and scientist
- Franciscus Bonae Spei (François Crespin; 1617–1677), Belgian Catholic scholastic philosopher
- Franciscus a Mesgnien Meninski (François Mesgnien; 1623–1698) French-born Turkologist and Ottoman historian

=== Given name ===
- Franciscus van den Enden (1602–1674), Flemish poet, physician, art dealer, philosopher, and teacher of Spinoza
- Franciscus de Neve (I) (1606–1681), Flemish history, landscape and portrait painter
- Franciscus Mercurius van Helmont (1614–1698), Flemish alchemist and writer
- Franciscus "Frans" van Schooten (1615–1660), Dutch mathematician
- Franciscus van der Steen (c.1625–1672), Flemish painter and engraver
- Franciscus Carré (c.1630–1669), Dutch painter and draftsman
- Franciscus de Neve (II) (1632–aft.1704), Flemish painter and engraver
- Franciscus "Frans" Kiggelaer (1648–1722), Dutch botanist and apothecary
- Franciscus Gijsbrechts (1649–aft.1677), Flemish Baroque painter
- Franciscus Andreas Durlet (1816–1867), Belgian architect, sculptor and printmaker
- Franciscus Cornelis "Franz" Donders (1818–1889), Dutch ophthalmologist
- Franciscus Kenninck (1859–1937), Dutch Old Catholic Archbishop
- Franciscus G.J. "Frans" van Lith (1863–1926), Dutch Jesuit missionary on Java
- Franciscus Hermanus Bach (1865–1956), Dutch painter
- Franciscus Hubertus "Frans" Schraven (1873–1937), Dutch Catholic Bishop who acted as missionary in China
- Franciscus C.M. "Frans" Wijffels (1899–1968), Dutch Minister of Social Affairs
- Franciscus Bernardus Jacobus Kuiper (1907–2003), Dutch Indologist
- Franciscus Xaverius "Frans" Seda (1926–2009), Indonesian finance minister
- Franciscus Xaverius Rocharjanta Prajasuta (1931–2015), Indonesian Roman Catholic bishop and composer
- Franciscus Jozef "Frans" Brüggen (1934–2014), Dutch conductor, recorder player and baroque flautist
- Franciscus J.M. "Frans" Wiertz (born 1942), Dutch Roman Catholic bishop
- Franciscus J. "Frans" Luitjes (1944–1965), Dutch sprinter
- Franciscus Wilhelmus Maria Broers (1944–2013), Dutch writer using the pseudonym Jacq Firmin Vogelaar
- Franciscus Henri (born 1947), Dutch-Australian musician
- Franciscus B.M. "Frans" de Waal (born 1948), Dutch primatologist and ethologist
- Franciscus Adrianus "Frans" van Vught (born 1950), Dutch social scientist
- Franciscus H.G. "Frank" de Grave (born 1955), Dutch Minister of Defence
- Franciscus C.G.M. "Frans" Timmermans (born 1961), Dutch politician and diplomat, Minister of Foreign affairs
- Franciscus A.A.J. "Frans" Maasen (born 1965), Dutch cyclist and directeur sportif
- Franciscus "Frank" de Boer (born 1970), Dutch football player and manager

=== Surname ===
- Hoke L. Franciscus, electronics researcher
- James Franciscus (1934–1991), American actor
- Steve Franciscus (born 1982), Papua New Guinean rugby player
