= Franziskus =

- Gender: masculine

Origin
- Origin: Latin

Other names
- Related names: Franciscus, Francis, Francisco, François, Françoise, Franciszek, Francesco, Francesc, Ferenc, Frank, Franco, Franz, Frans, Franklin

Franziskus is a name which is derivative of the Latin given name Franciscus.

== As a given name ==
- Franziskus von Paula Graf von Schönborn
- Franziskus von Bettinger
- Franziskus von Sales Bauer
- Franziskus Hennemann

== As a surname ==
- Daniel Franziskus
