= Francesco =

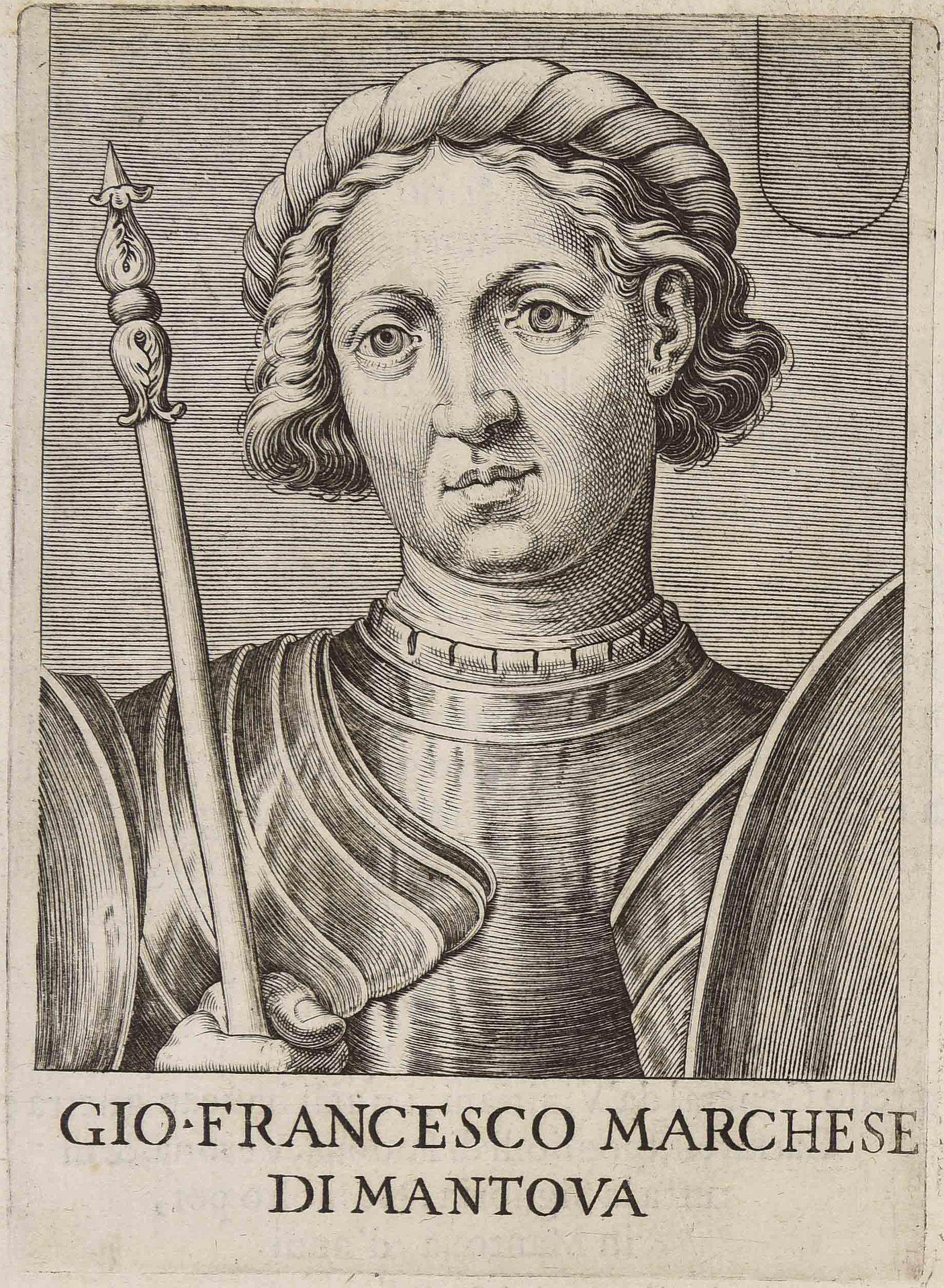
- Francesco I of Gonzaga
- Pronunciation: Italian: [franˈtʃesko]
- Gender: Masculine

Origin
- Origin: Francis
- Meaning: "Free man"
- Region of origin: Italy

Other names
- Nicknames: Frank, Frankie
- Related names: Franciscus, Francis, Francisco, François, Françoise, Franciszek, Francesc, Ferenc, Frank, Franco, Franz, Frans, Franklin

Francesco, the Italian (and original) version of the personal name "Francis", is one of the most common given names among males in Italy. Notable persons with that name include:

== People with the given name Francesco ==
- Francesco I (disambiguation), several people
- Francesco Albani (1578–1660), Italian painter
- Francesco Algarotti (1712–1764), Italian philosopher
- Francesco Attolico (born 1963), Italian water polo player
- Francesco Bagnaia (born 1998), Italian racing motorcyclist
- Francesco Barbaro (disambiguation), several people
- Francesco Bernardi (disambiguation), several people
- Francesco Berni (1497–1536), Italian writer
- Francesco Beschi (born 1951), Italian bishop
- Francesco Bianchini (1662–1729), Italian philosopher and scientist
- Francesco Galli Bibiena (1659–1739), Italian architect and designer
- Francesco Bilotto (born 1977), American designer and entertainment expert
- Francesco Ricci Bitti (born 1942), Italian sports official
- Francesco Antonio Bonporti (1672–1749), Italian priest and composer
- Francesco Borromini (1599–1667), Swiss sculptor and architect
- Francesco Bruno (sport shooter) (born 1968), Italian sport shooter
- Francesco Calogero (1935–2026), Italian physicist and peace activist
- Francesco Canova da Milano (1497–1543), Italian lutenist and composer
- Francesco Castiglia (1891–1973), later Frank Costello, Italian-American crime boss
- Francesco Cavalli (1602–1676), Italian composer
- Francesco Celeste (born 1994), Argentine footballer
- Francesco Cernuto (born 1992), Italian footballer
- Francesco Cetti (1726–1778), Italian Jesuit scientist
- Francesco D'Ovidio (1849–1925), Italian philologist and literary critic
- Francesco da Mosto (born 1961), Italian architect, filmmaker, and television presenter
- Francesco de Sanctis (1817–1883), Italian literary critic and scholar
- Francesco di Giorgio Martini (1439–1501), Italian architect, engineer, and painter
- Francesco Geminiani (1687–1762), Italian violinist and composer
- Francesco Gianotti (1881–1967), Argentine-Italian architect
- Francesco Greco (1942–2018), Italian lawyer and politician
- Francesco Maria Grimaldi (1618–1663), Italian mathematician and physicist
- Francesco Guardi (1712–1793), Italian artist
- Francesco Hayez (1791–1882), Italian painter
- Francesco Jerace (1853–1937), Italian sculptor
- Francesco Lo Celso (born 2000), Argentine footballer
- Francesco Lollobrigida (born 1972), Italian lawyer and politician
- Francesco Macri (1931–2019), Argentine-Italian businessman
- Francesco Manfredini (1684–1762), Italian composer
- Francesco Mastriani (1819–1891), Italian novelist
- Francesco Merloni (1925–2024), Italian industrialist, academic, and politician
- Francesco Moser (born 1951), Italian cyclist
- Frank Nitti, aka Francesco Raffaele Nitto (1886–1943), a mafia enforcer
- Francesco Parisi (painter) (1857–1948), Argentine-Italian painter
- Francesco Patera (born 1993), Belgian professional boxer
- Francesco Postiglione (born 1972), Italian swimmer and water polo player
- Francesco Primaticcio (1504–1570), Italian painter, architect, and sculptor
- Francesco Puccinotti (1794–1872), Italian pathologist
- Francesco Righetti (1835–1917), Argentine architect
- Francesco Saverio Romano (born 1964), Italian politician and lawyer
- Francesco Rosi (1922–2015), Italian filmmaker
- Francesco Russo (actor) (born 1993), Italian actor
- Francesco Schettino (born 1960), Italian former ship captain and prisoner
- Francesco Scipione, marchese di Maffei (1675–1755), Italian archaeologist
- Francesco Tamburini (1846–1891), Argentine-Italian architect
- Francesco Ticciati (1893–1949), Italian musician
- Francesco Totti (born 1976), Italian football player
- Francesco Maria Veracini (1690–1768), Italian composer
- Francesco Zahra (1710–1773), Maltese painter
- Francesco Antonio Zaccaria (1714–1795), Italian theologian and historian
- Francesco Zuccarelli (1702–1788), Italian painter
- Francesco Zurolo (first half of the 15th century–1480), Italian feudal lord, baron, and Italian leader

== Characters with the given name ==
- Francesco Bernoulli, a character in the animated film Cars 2
