= Franses =

Franses can refer to

- Jack Franses (1927–2010), English expert on Islamic art, carpets and textiles.
- Philip Hans Franses (born 1963), Dutch economist

== See also ==
- France (disambiguation)
- Fransen, Dutch surname
- Franssen, Dutch surname
