= Franssen =

Franssen is a Dutch patronymic surname meaning "son of Frans". It can refer to:

- Everhardt Franßen (born 1937), German judge
- Jan Franssen (born 1951), Dutch politician
- Jo Franssen (1909–1995), Dutch politician
- MHH Franssen (1903–1981), Dutch lawyer
- Margot Franssen (born 1952), Dutch-born Canadian philanthropist, activist and entrepreneur
- Nico Valentinus Franssen (1932–1993), Dutch-born American physicist and inventor
  - Franssen effect, an auditory illusion discovered by him

Franssens

- Joep Franssens (born 1955), Dutch composer

== See also ==
- Fransen, Dutch surname
