= Artigas (disambiguation) =

José Gervasio Artigas (1764–1850) was a central figure in Uruguay's struggles for independence from Spain and Buenos Aires.

Artigas may also refer to:

== People ==
- Francesc Santacruz i Artigas (17th–18th century), Catalan sculptor of Baroque works
- João Batista Vilanova Artigas (1915–1985), Brazilian modernist architect
- Jorge Artigas Carrica (born 1975), Argentine-Uruguayan footballer
- Jorge Artigas Coch (1929–2022), Chilean entomologist
- Josep Llorens i Artigas (1892–1980), Spanish ceramic artist
- Juan Benito Artigas Hernández (1934–2021), Spanish architect
- Mariano Artigas (1938–2006), Spanish physicist, philosopher, and theologian
- Salvador Artigas (1913–1997), Spanish footballer and manager
- Santiago Artigas (1881–1931), Spanish actor

== Places ==
- Artigas, Uruguay, a city
- Artigas Department, a region of Uruguay
- Artigas Base, an Uruguayan research station in Antarctica
- Pueblo Capitán Juan Antonio Artigas, a former denomination of Barros Blancos, Uruguay
- Fortaleza General Artigas, a fortress on top of the Cerro de Montevideo

== Other uses ==
- Artigas flag, a national symbol of Uruguay
- A number of ships of the National Navy of Uruguay
- Count d'Artigas, alias used by the pirate Ker Karraje in Jules Verne's "Facing the Flag"
