= Manzanares 25 =

Historic house and cultural center in Mexico City

- Centro Cultural Manzanares 25 (Spanish)
- The house in 2020
- Interactive map of Manzanares 25
- Location: Manzanares 25, La Merced, Historic center of Mexico City

History
- Built: 16th century

Site notes
- Restored: 2018
- Restored by: INAH and Fideicomiso Centro Histórico de la Ciudad de México

Manzanares 25 is a house in the La Merced neighborhood of the Historic center of Mexico City. It dates from the 16th century and is credited as the oldest surviving house in Mexico City. After eight years of restoration it opened in 2018 as the Centro Cultural Manzanares 25 (Manzanares 25 Cultural Center), which holds workshops for children of the area.

== Description ==
The house on Calle Manzanares, June 2024

The house is on Calle Manzanares, near the Iglesia de Nuestro Señor de la Humildad and Avenida Circunvalación. It has one story and a central patio with 17 rooms around it. Architect Juan Benito Artigas counted 15 rooms.

The layout follows the pre-Hispanic Mesoamerican way of building contiguous dwellings around a patio. The head of the family had the largest room, and the other rooms went to his children and their families. Artigas called the house an example of "creatividad novohispana" (creativity of New Spain), because it adds Spanish elements to the Mesoamerican plan.

The walls are stone, tezontle (a volcanic rock) and brick (tabique), with cantera stone frames around the doors and windows. The cantera frames are one of the Spanish features of the house. The use of adarajas, a way of embedding the door and window frames in the wall, is also taken as a sign of its age.

== History ==
Specialists date the house to the 16th century. A prominent indigenous family of traders lived in it. The family lived through the Spanish conquest. Artigas had already written about the plot on page 606 of his book México: Arquitectura del siglo XVI.

In front of the house ran the Acequia Real and the Regina canal, which carried canoes and trajineras (flat-bottomed boats). Another pre-Hispanic canal crossed the northwest corner of the lot.

In the 17th century almost all other 16th-century buildings of the viceregal capital were badly damaged by floods and by changes to their design. Milenio wrote that Manzanares 25 survived dozens of earthquakes of magnitude 7 or greater and repeated floods. In 2018 the director general of INAH (National Institute of Anthropology and History), Diego Prieto Hernández, called it the only surviving 16th-century architecture in the capital. Some versions say that the oldest house in the city is instead a building in San Ángel, but the Fideicomiso Centro Histórico backs Manzanares 25.

Around 2005, the Fideicomiso Centro Histórico and INAH expropriated about 100 buildings in the Historic Center to study and restore them. One of them, on Calle Manzanares, was used as a house and vecindad (tenement). Artigas discovered the house in 2010. The house is listed in INAH's Catalog of Historical Monuments.

When work began, according to Fideicomiso head José Mariano Leyva, the house was a garbage dump with concrete and brick additions. The restoration took eight years. The Fideicomiso Centro Histórico carried out the work under supervision of INAH.

== Cultural center ==
The Centro Cultural Manzanares 25 was inaugurated in November 2018. It brings art and trades to children of the area. They live in La Merced and Tepito in Cuauhtémoc borough, and in Candelaria de los Patos, in Venustiano Carranza borough. Leyva said about 800 children live on the nearby blocks.

The workshops include drawing, cooking and a homework club. The center also has a small site museum on the rescue of the house. According to the Secretaría de Cultura it has workshop spaces, a ludoteca (play library), a teaching kitchen, a music room and a dining room. The project was also promoted by the Danish artist Gitte Rog and the chronicler Jesús Petlacalco, who link it with the community. Visits are free on Fridays.

== Gallery ==
Historical marker, June 2024

The house on Calle Manzanares, June 2024
