= ROU General Artigas =

ROU General Arigas is the name of the following ships of the Uruguayan Navy, named for General José Gervasio Artigas:

- ROU General Artigas (02), ex-Victor Schœlcher, a Commandant Rivière-class frigate acquired from France in 1988 and decommissioned and subsequently scrapped in 2005
- ROU General Artigas (04), ex-Freiburg, a Lüneburg-class replenishment ship acquired from Germany and commissioned in 2005

== See also ==
- ROU Artigas, ex-USS Bronstein (DE-189), a Cannon-class destroyer escort acquired in 1952, broken up in 1988
- Artigas (disambiguation)
- General Artigas, a town in Paraguay
