= The Medici Effect =

Non-fiction work by Frans Johansson

The Medici Effect: Breakthrough Insights at the Intersection of Ideas, Concepts, and Cultures
- Author: Frans Johansson
- Language: English
- Published: 2004
- Publisher: Harvard Business School Press
- Publication place: United States
- ISBN: 1591391865
- OCLC: 611490724

The Medici Effect: Breakthrough Insights at the Intersection of Ideas, Concepts, and Cultures is a 2004 book written by American entrepreneur Frans Johansson. Published by Harvard Business School Press, it was listed as a Top 10 Business Book by Amazon.com and translated into 18 different languages. In the book, Johansson introduced the concept of the Medici Effect, which involves innovation that happens when disciplines and ideas intersect.

== Summary ==
In the book, Johansson argues that innovation comes from diverse industries, cultures, and disciplines when they all intersect, bringing ideas from one field into another. He also recommends assembling diverse teams of people to collaborate on innovation.

The name of the book is derived from the Medici Dynasty, an Italian banking family that came to power in the 14th century. The family's wealth was able to support artists that led to The Renaissance. The book looks at examples of how Renaissance painters, sculptors, poets, philanthropists, scientists, philosophers, financiers, and architects, shaped historical eras of innovation. The Medici family did not intend the Renaissance, but contributed to it with what Johansson coins as the "Medici Effect."

The book became the foundation for the Medici Effect, which involves contributions of disruptive innovation from people who have no experience in an industry. An example from the book includes Charles Darwin being a geologist and collecting a number of bird species from the Galápagos Islands. Darwin kept poor notes of his collection and returned the birds and notes over to John Gould upon his return. Gould was an expert ornithologist and initially dismissed the birds as being normal. Gould later discovered that each species was in fact distinct. The example from the book shows how Darwin, without the knowledge of ornithology, could contribute to the field without having the training or knowledge.

== Reception ==
BusinessWeek called The Medici Effect "one of the best books on innovation." It was described as a "work of art" by Entrepreneur. The Washington Post said that Johansson has "written a book dozens of business school professors meant to write, but couldn't." Harvard Business School professor Clayton M. Christensen stated that The Medici Effect is "One of the most insightful books on innovation I have ever read." The book became a best-seller and was listed as a Top 10 Business Book by Amazon.com. It was also translated into 18 different languages.

Based on the success of the book, Johansson founded The Medici Group, a consultancy firm that promotes innovation through diversity. He has appeared on national media and in publications that include Black Enterprise, Diversity Executive, Anderson Cooper 360°, and CNBC's The Business of Innovation.

== Editions ==
The book was released in 2004 by Harvard Business School Press. The first edition of the book was called The Medici Effect: Breakthrough Insights at the Intersection of Ideas, Concepts, and Cultures.

In 2006 the book was republished in paperback and Kindle format with the title The Medici Effect: What Elephants and Epidemics Can Teach Us About Innovation.

On March 7, 2017 an updated edition was published in hardcover, paperback and Kindle format with the title The Medici Effect, With a New Preface and Discussion Guide: What Elephants and Epidemics Can Teach Us About Innovation.
