= Massacre of the Innocents (Rubens) =

Painting by Peter Paul Rubens

The Massacre of the Innocents
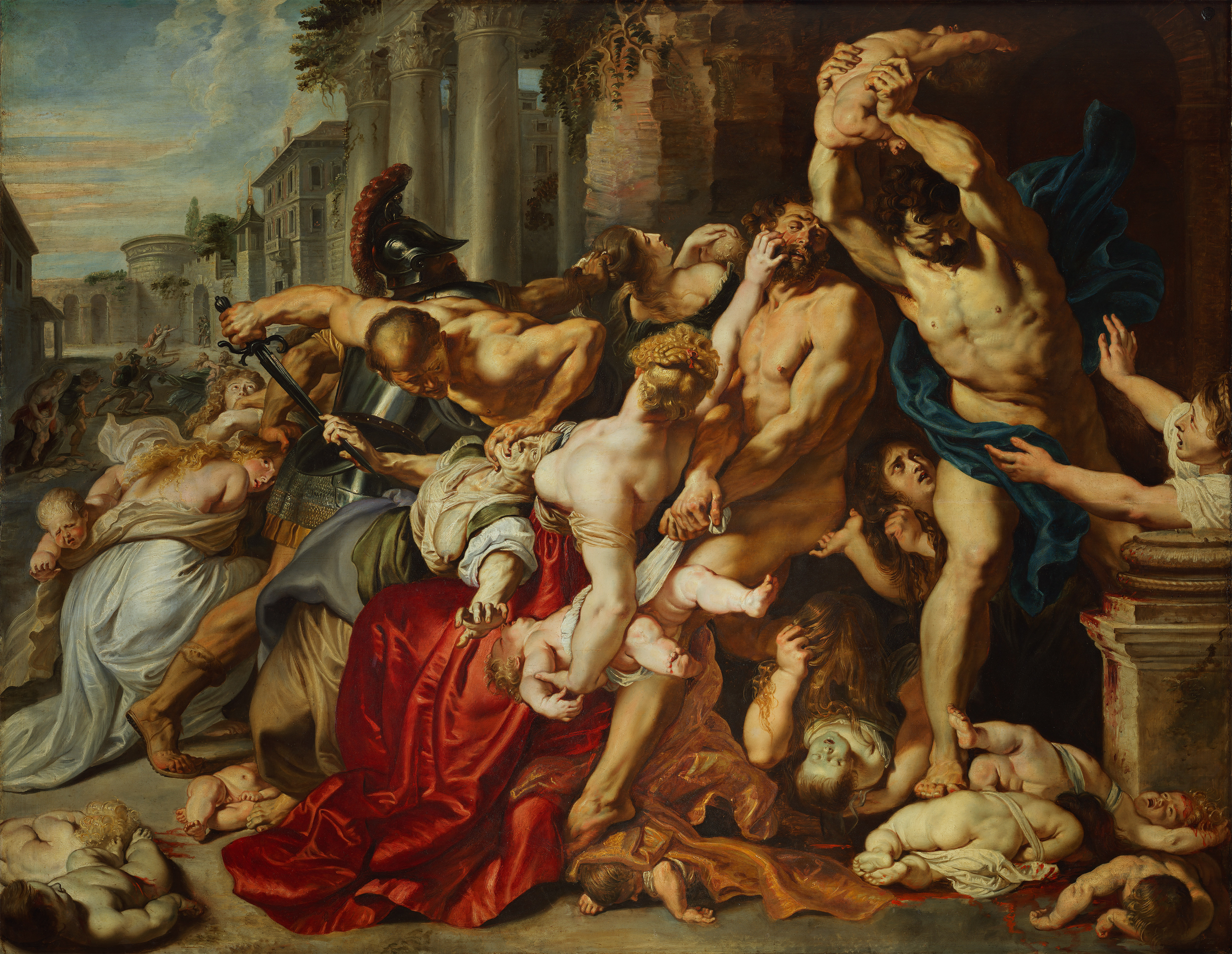
- The Massacre of the Innocents, between 1609 and 1611
- Artist: Peter Paul Rubens
- Year: 1610
- Medium: Oil on canvas
- Movement: Flemish Baroque
- Subject: Massacre of the Innocents
- Dimensions: 142 cm × 183 cm × 1.9 cm (56 in × 72 in × 0.75 in)
- Weight: 93.9 kilograms (207 lb)
- Location: Art Gallery of Ontario, Toronto
- Accession: 2014/1581

Massacre of the Innocents
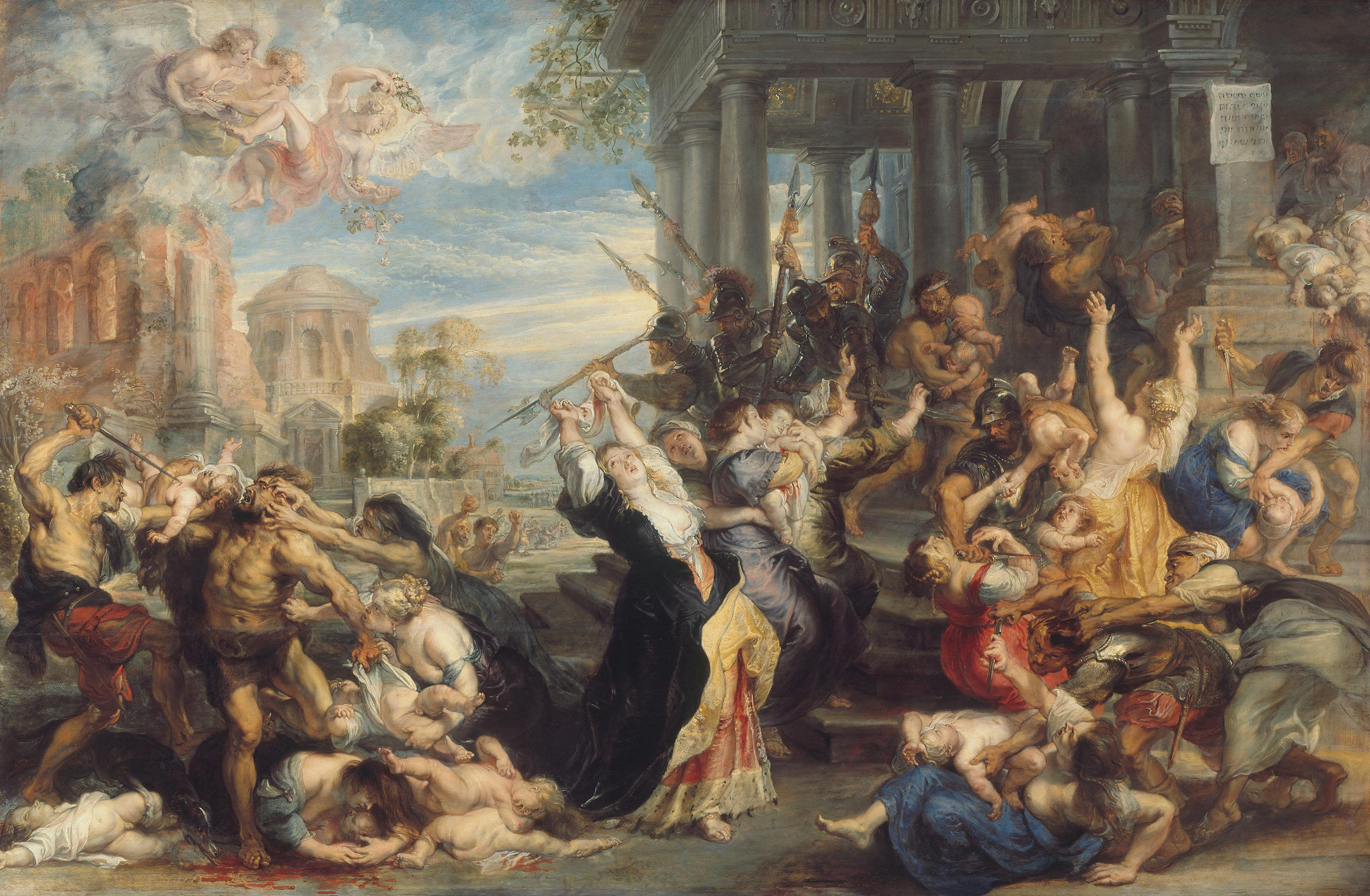
- The Massacre of the Innocents, 1638
- Year: 1638
- Medium: Oil on panel
- Dimensions: 198.5 cm × 302.2 cm (78.1 in × 119.0 in)
- Location: Alte Pinakothek, Munich
- Accession: 572 (Bavarian State Painting Collections)

The Massacre of the Innocents is the subject of two paintings by Peter Paul Rubens depicting the episode of the biblical Massacre of the Innocents of Bethlehem, as related in the Gospel of Matthew (2:13–18). The first, measuring 142 x 182 cm, was painted after his return to his native Antwerp in 1608, following eight years spent in Italy.

== First painting ==
The first version painted by Rubens dates from around 1611–12. At the end of the seventeenth century, the painting became part of the Liechtenstein Collection in Vienna, Austria, along with another Rubens painting, Samson and Delilah. The Forchondt brothers sold both paintings to Hans-Adam I, Prince of Liechtenstein whom they knew through his father Karl Eusebius, Prince of Liechtenstein around 1700. The paintings were given the Liechtenstein family seal and are recorded in the collection until the 19th century, where drawings in 1815 show they hung side by side in the Garden Palace in Vienna.

After being catalogued by Vincenzio Fanti as a Franciscus de Neve (II) in 1767, the Massacre was attributed in an anonymous inventory of the Liechtenstein Collection dated 1780 to one of Rubens' assistants, Jan van den Hoecke, after Rubens. The composition was already known from what is now seen as a copy by Rubens' workshop. This was bought in 1902 by the Royal Museums of Fine Arts of Belgium in Brussels as a work by Antoon Sallaert. Under that attribution it remained until it was sold to an Austrian family in 1920. It was subsequently loaned in 1923 to Stift Reichersberg, a monastery in northern Austria.

In 2001, the painting was seen by George Gordon, an expert in Flemish and Dutch paintings at Sotheby's in London. He was persuaded that it was indeed a Rubens by its similar characteristics and style to the Samson and Delilah painted around the same time. The work was sold at auction at Sotheby's, London on July 10, 2002, for £49.5 million (C$117 million) to Canadian businessman and art collector Kenneth Thomson, 2nd Baron Thomson of Fleet.

Following the auction the painting was loaned to the National Gallery, London for a period before its transfer in 2008 to the Art Gallery of Ontario in Toronto, to whom Thomson had donated it, and which was undergoing a major rebuilding and expansion during those years.

=== Later versions ===
Towards the end of his life, between 1636 and 1638, Rubens painted a second version of the Massacre of the Innocents. This version was acquired by the Alte Pinakothek, Munich by 1706, where it remains.

A copy of this later version was made as an engraving in 1643 by Paulus Pontius.

== Analysis ==
It is widely regarded as a demonstration of the artist's learnings from his time spent in Italy between 1600 and 1608, where he observed first-hand the works of Italian Baroque painters like Caravaggio. These influences are seen in this painting through the sheer drama and emotive dynamism of the scene, as well as the rich colour. There is also evidence of the use of chiaroscuro. He also used écorché figures – anatomical statues with the skin removed-to study how the body was made.

== Context ==
At the time of Rubens' first painting on the subject Antwerp had been involved in warfare only a few years before – a conflict temporarily frozen by the truce of 1609. In one year alone over 8,000 citizens had been killed by Calvinists and Catholics alike as the Spanish forces ruling the Netherlands sought to repel Protestant armies. Massacres were a reality in Antwerp; 160 kilometres (100 mi) north of the city the Protestant rebel leader Prince Maurits commissioned Cornelis van Haarlem to paint the same scene for Haarlem's town hall,- propaganda intended to tell of Spanish atrocities against the Dutch people. Antwerp however remained a Catholic stronghold and became a leading centre of Counter Reformation thought.

In August 2022, three members of Letzte Generation set up an action at the Alte Pinakothek in Munich : two activists glued themselves to the frame of a Rubens painting and one filmed the action. The demonstration resulted in 11,000 euros worth of damage (while the canvas was unharmed, the frame had suffered). In May 2023, they were sentenced to a fine of 2,400 euros each.

== See also ==
- List of most expensive paintings
