= Francies =

Francies is a surname. Notable people with the surname include:

- Michael Francies (born 1956), British solicitor
- Chris Francies (born 1982), American football player
- Coye Francies (born 1986), American football player
- Duane Francies (1921–2004), American military aviator

== See also ==
- Francis (disambiguation)
