= Jan van den Hecke =

Flemish painter, draughtsman, printmaker and engraver (1620–1684)

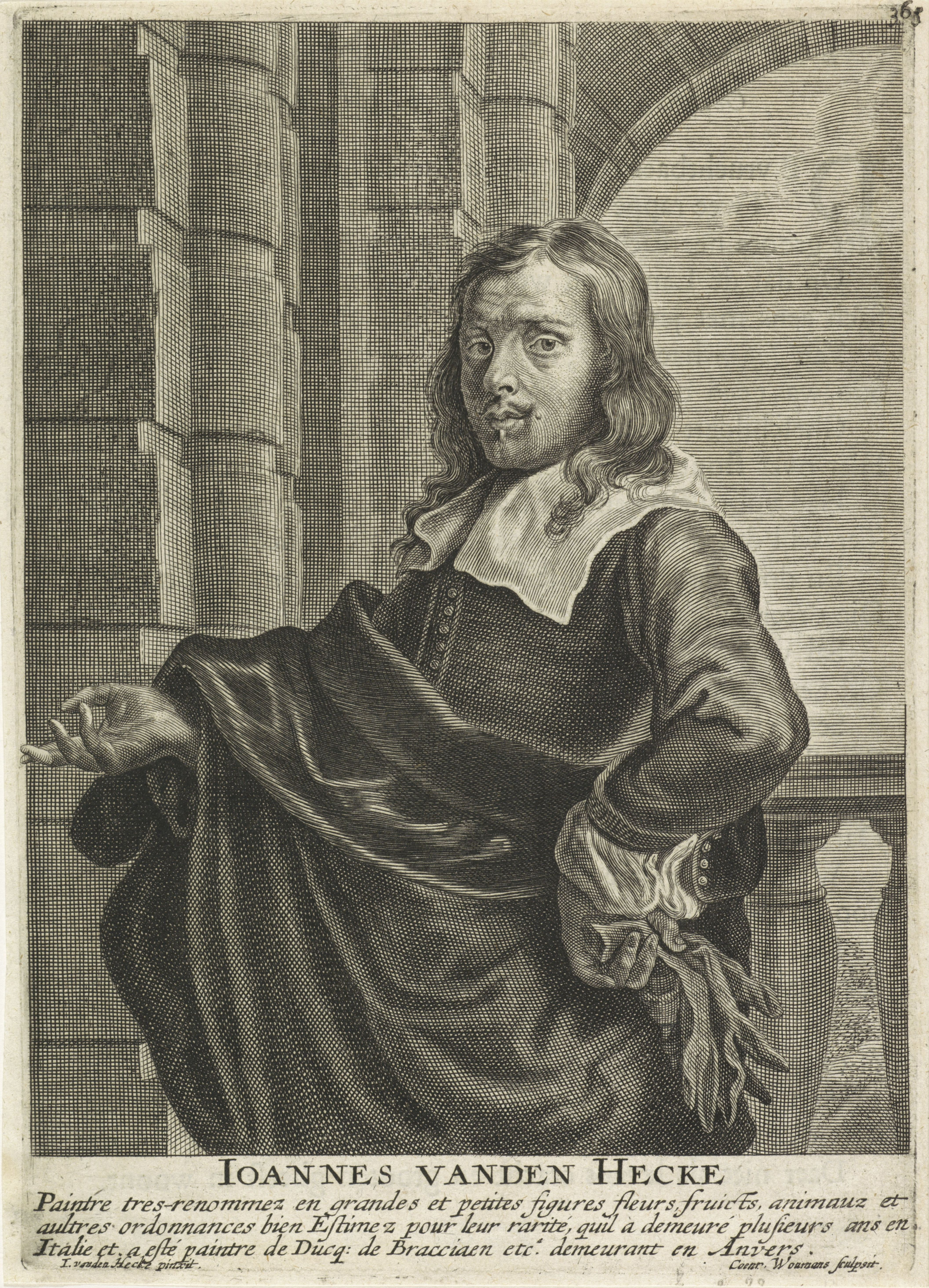
Portrait of Jan van den Hecke

Jan van den Hecke or Jan van den Hecke the Elder (1620–1684) was a Flemish Baroque painter, draughtsman, printmaker and engraver, mainly known for his still lifes, landscapes and battle scenes. After training in Antwerp, he spent time in Rome, where he had important patrons. After his return to Flanders, he worked for a while in Brussels, probably painting flower still lifes for Archduke Leopold Wilhelm of Austria, the Austrian governor of the Spanish Netherlands, before returning to work in Antwerp.

== Life ==
Van den Hecke was born in Kwaremont near Ronse, about 10 km from Oudenaarde, East Flanders. He was registered in the Antwerp Guild of Saint Luke as an apprentice in 1636. He was a pupil of Abraham Hack, who also taught his contemporary, the flower painter Hieronymus Galle. He became a master in the Antwerp Guild in the year 1641–1642.

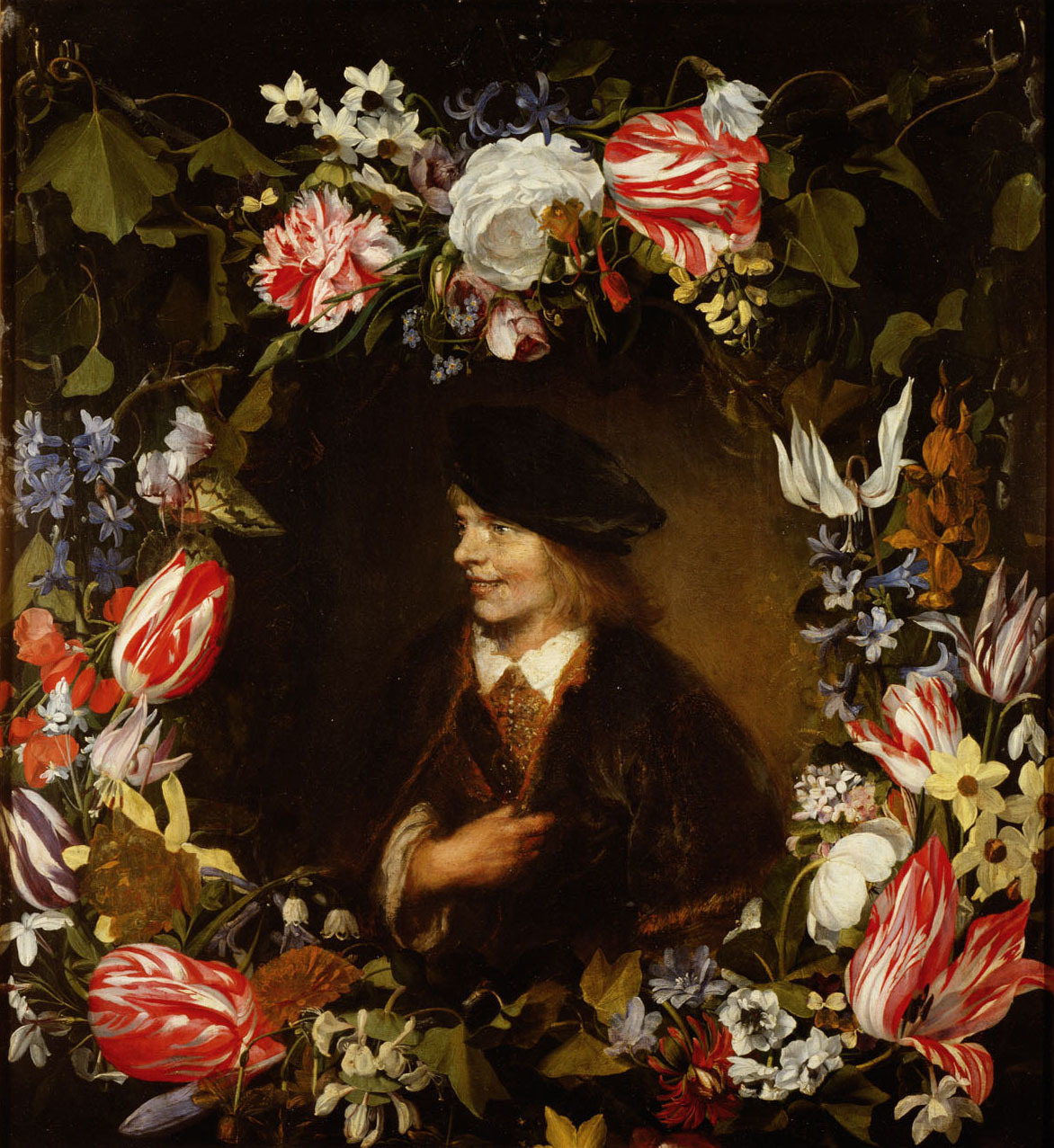
Portrait of a young man in a flower garland

He travelled to Italy, and spent a period in Rome. The precise dates of his trip are unknown: the alternatives that have been proposed are from 1644 to 1659 and 1653 to 1658. While there, he enjoyed the patronage of Paolo Giordano II Orsini, the duke of Bracciano. He may also have travelled in France during the 1650s.

Van den Hecke spent time in Brussels in the mid-1650s. At this time he may have worked for Archduke Leopold Wilhelm of Austria, the Austrian governor of the Spanish Netherlands. who resided in Brussels and was an avid art collector. A number of van den Hecke's still life paintings found their way into the Archduke's collection and from there into the collection of the Kunsthistorisches Museum in Vienna. Archduke Leopold Wilhelm must have particularly liked his flower pieces as all of van den Hecke's paintings which he collected were pictures of flowers in vases and baskets and garland paintings. Van den Hecke returned to Antwerp around 1657.

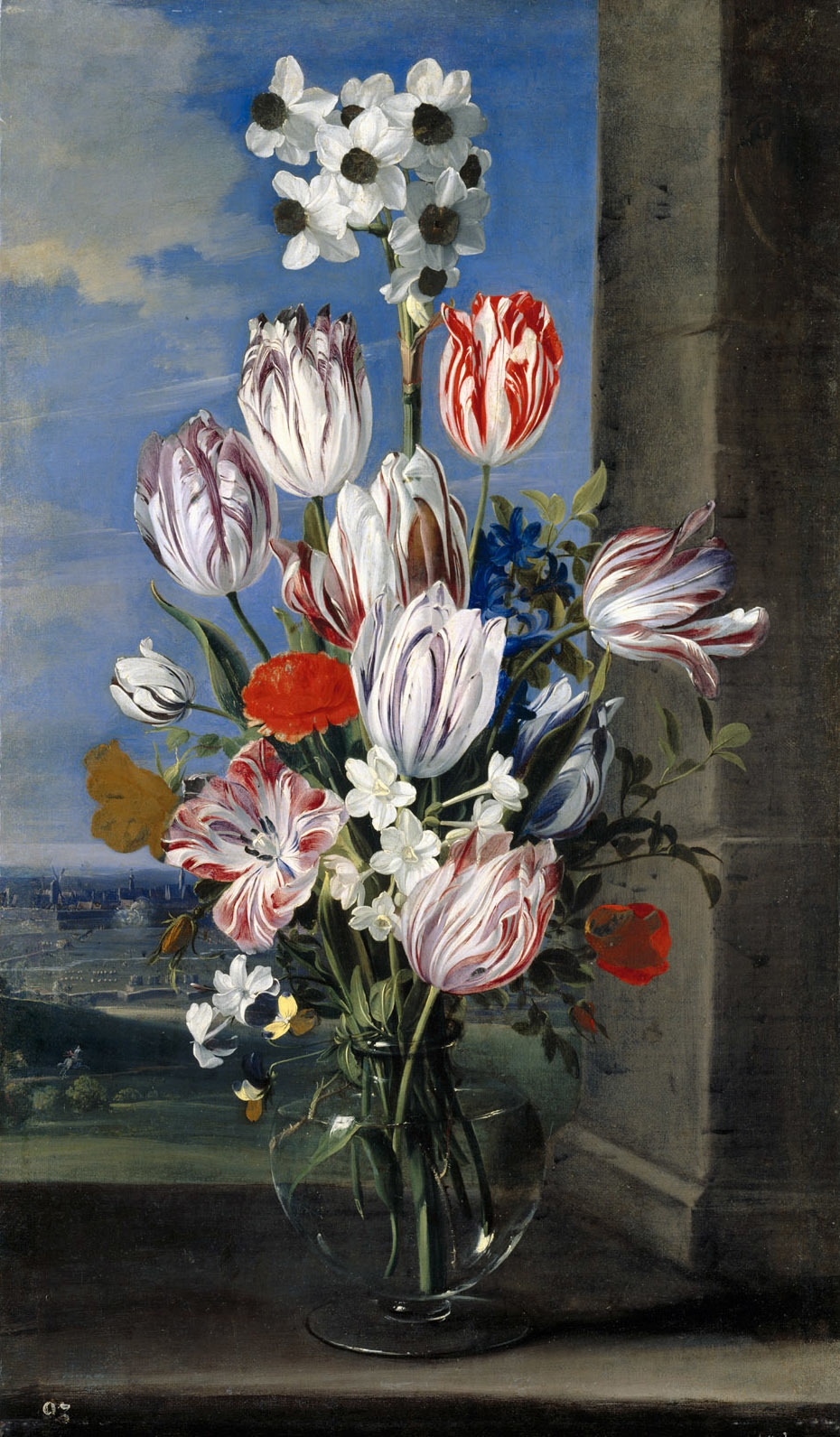
Flowers in a vase with the siege of Gravelines

In 1660, van der Hecke married Maria Adriana Heyens, with whom he had three children. His son, known as Jan van den Hecke the Younger, was born in 1661 and became a popular painter of flowers and of other types of still life as well as of landscapes.

Van den Hecke's two known pupils were Peeter vander Elstraeten (1657–60) and Peeter de Clerc (1672–73).

Van den Hecke died in Antwerp in 1684.

== Work ==
=== General ===
Jan van den Hecke was a versatile artist working in many genres and techniques. He made still lifes of flowers, fruit and game, paintings of animals, landscapes, genre scenes, military scenes and allegorical paintings.

=== Still lifes ===
He was a gifted flower painter. As in the work of other Antwerp painters of his generation such as Jan Brueghel the Younger and Philips de Marlier, some of the flower paintings of van den Hecke were dedicated to the presentation of a single variety of flowers: tulips and wallflowers. Some of his flower still lifes, such as the Flowers in a Vase with the Siege of Gravelingen (Kunsthistorisches Museum), include a view onto a landscape or a battle scene, two genres in which van den Hecke was skilled.

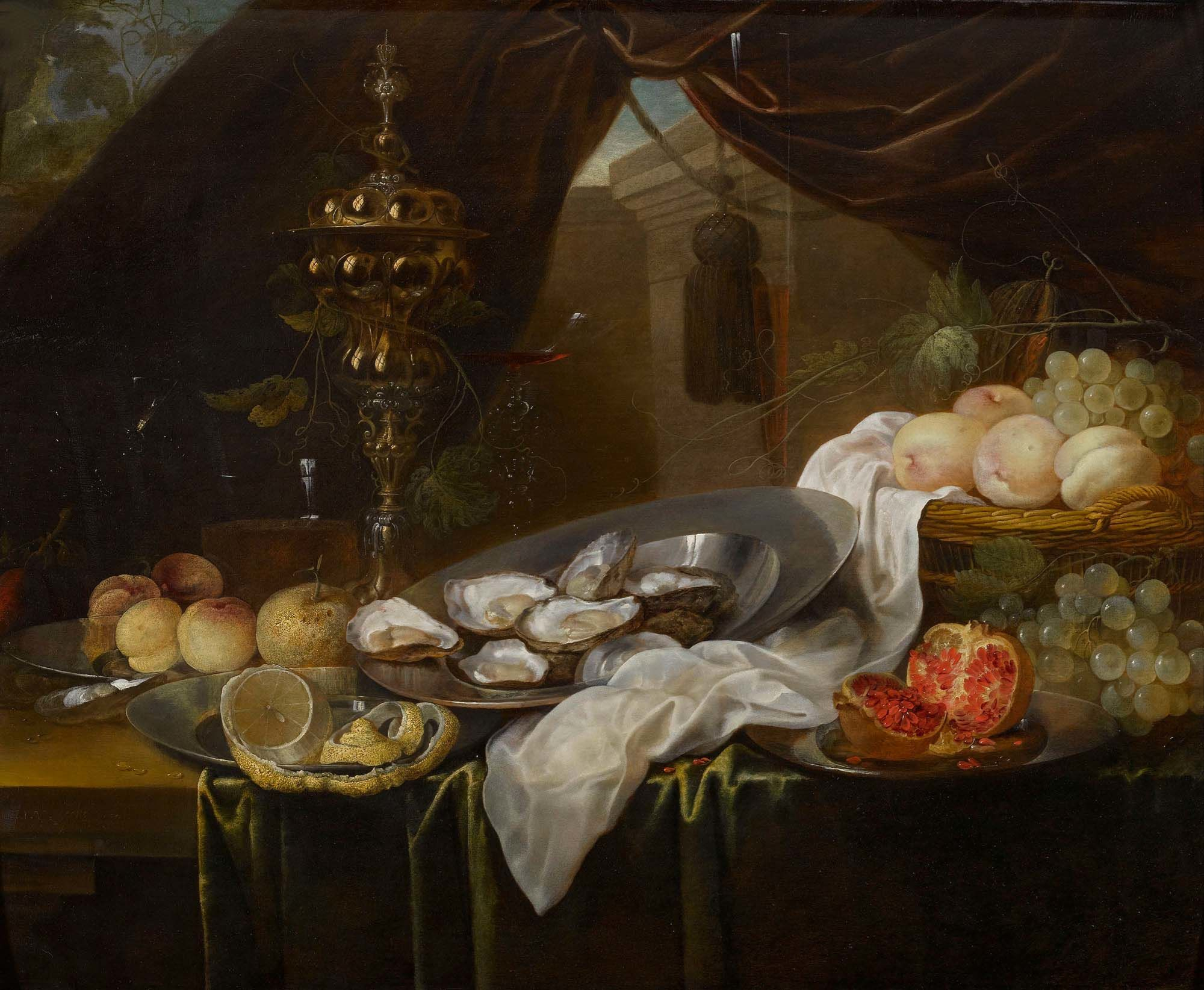
Sumptuous still life

Jan van den Hecke made a number of works in a distinctively Flemish genre, which is referred to as 'garland painting'. Garland paintings are a special type of still life developed in early 17th century Antwerp by Jan Brueghel the Elder at the instigation of the Italian cardinal Federico Borromeo. Other artists involved in the early development of the genre included Hendrick van Balen, Andries Daniels, Peter Paul Rubens and Daniel Seghers. Garland paintings typically show a flower garland around a devotional image or portrait. The genre was initially connected to the visual imagery of the Counter-Reformation movement. It was further inspired by the cult of veneration and devotion to Mary prevalent at the Habsburg court (then the rulers over the Southern Netherlands) and in Antwerp generally. Garland paintings typically show a flower garland around a devotional image, portrait or other religious symbol (such as the host).

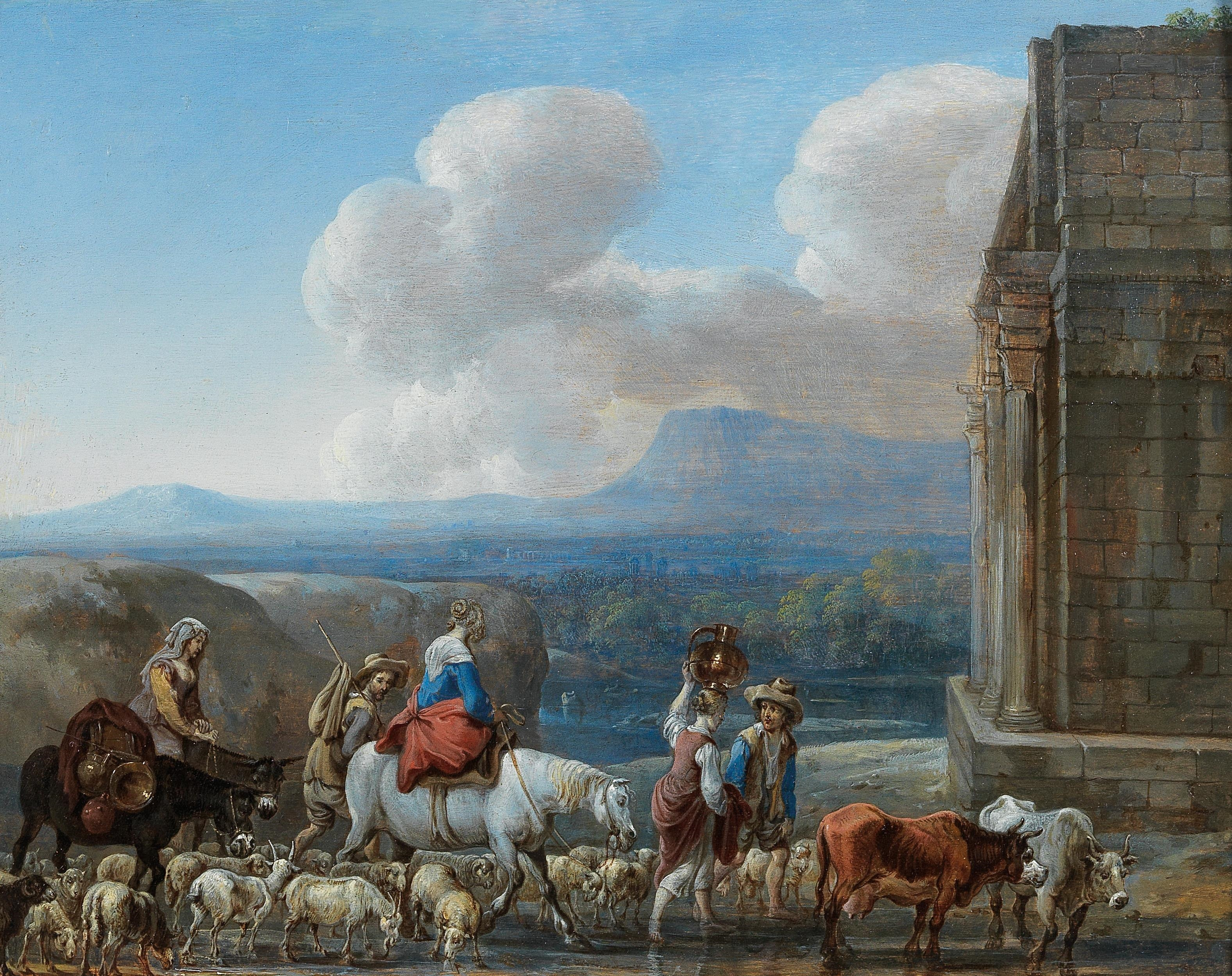
Shepherds and travellers by a triumphal arch in the Roman Campagna

Garland paintings were typically collaborations between a still life specialist and a figure painter. As van den Hecke was a gifted figure painter he may have painted both the still life elements as the figures in some of his garland paintings. This may have been the case in his Rosary Madonna in a Garland (circa 1671, Kroměříž Archdiocesan Museum, Kroměříž, Czech Republic). A collaboration with the figure painter Jan Lievens is the Portrait of a Young Man in Flower Garland (c. 1642–1644, Kunsthistorisches Museum).

Van den Hecke also painted still lifes of game with dogs in the style of Jan Fyt and pronkstillevens with ostentatious objects, a genre invented in Antwerp. He was particularly skilled at painting gold, silver, crystal and porcelain.

=== Landscapes and military scenes ===
His landscapes often include battle or military scenes with many figures. His landscapes are in an Italianate style. One of his paintings representing a Market in the Roman Campagna was formerly attributed to the Flemish Italianate painter Anton Goubau. Other of his landscapes tend towards the genre scenes painted by the group of Flemish and Dutch painters in Rome known as the Bamboccianti. The Bamboccianti comprised mostly Dutch and Flemish artists who had brought existing traditions of depicting peasant subjects from sixteenth-century Netherlandish art with them to Italy, and generally created small cabinet paintings or etchings of the everyday life of the lower classes in Rome and its countryside.

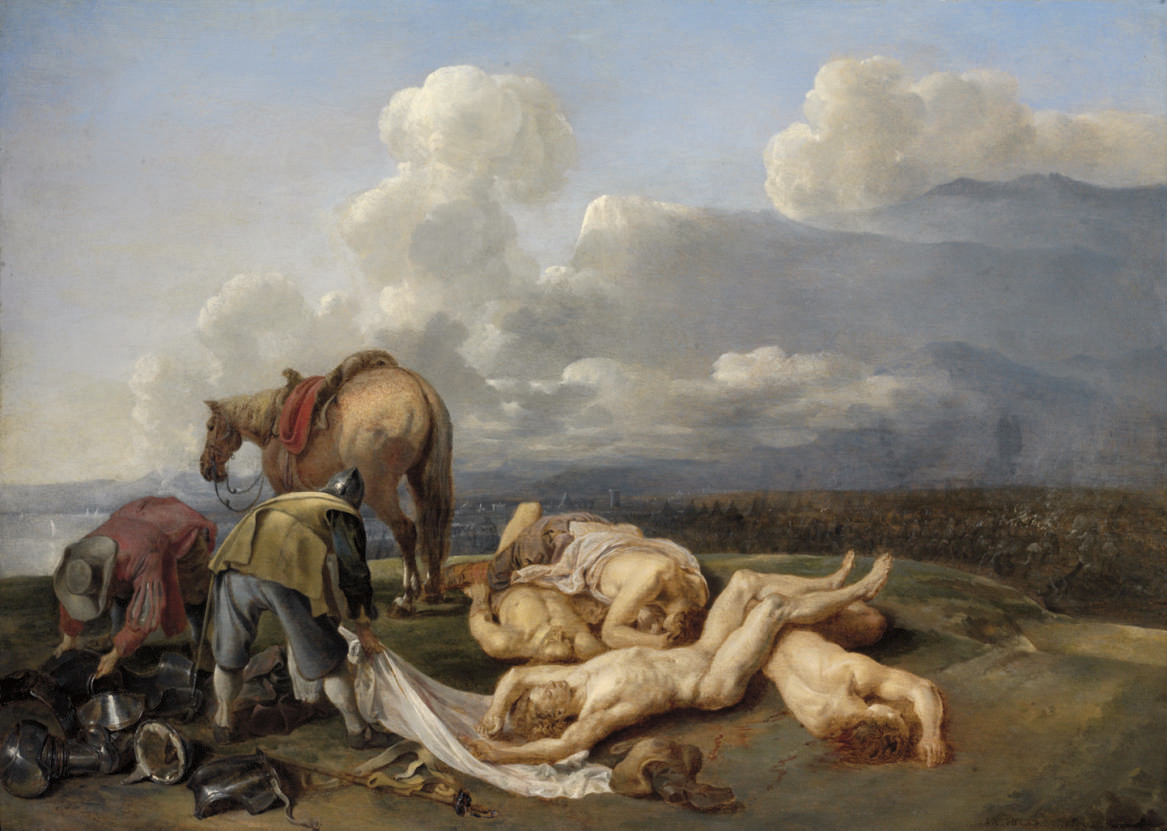
The aftermath of the battle

=== Prints ===
In the mid-1650s he made a number of etchings depicting various animals and battle scenes. He collaborated with other printmakers on publishing projects. In 1654 he made the designs for a series of 10 plates which were engraved by the Dutch engraver Theodor van Kessel and were entitled Alcune Animali (Some animals). This series depicted various animals. He created another series of 11 prints plus a title page referred to as the Zoographia (Description of Animals), which also depicted different animals and was printed in 1656. It was dedicated to van den Hecke's patron in Rome, Paolo Giordano II Orsini, the duke of Bracciano.

He made a topographical drawing of the Castle of Reet that was engraved by Jacob Neefs as an illustration in the Antwerp historian Jacob Le Roy's Notitia Marchionatus Sacri Romani Imperii (published in Amsterdam by Albertus Magnus and printed by Frans Lamminga, 1678), a book with engravings of secular and religious landmarks or points of interest in the Spanish Netherlands.
