= Hieronymus Galle =

Flemish painter (1625–1679)

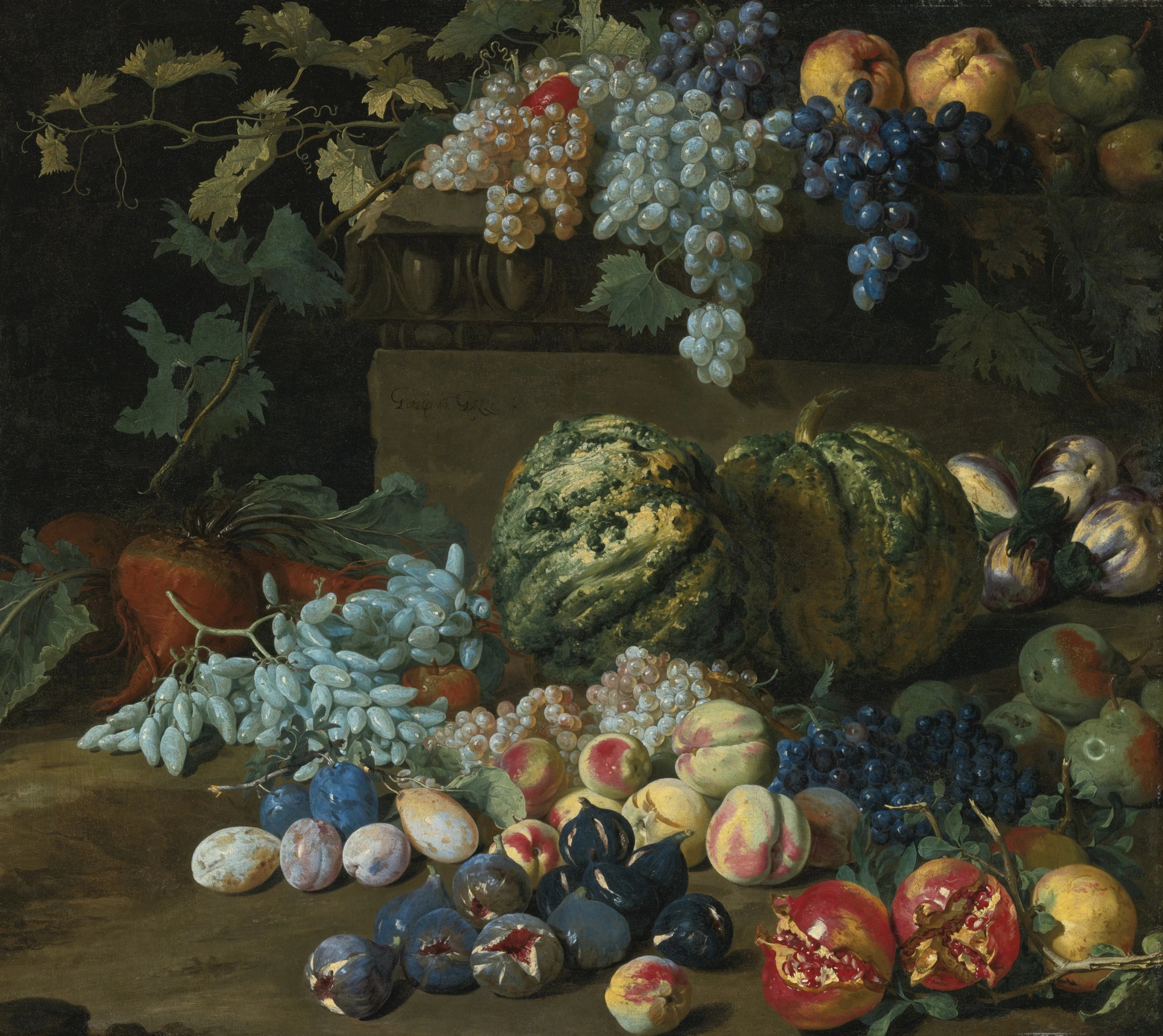
Pumpkins, grapes, peaches, plums, pomegranates, pears, figs, apples and turnips by a plinth

Hieronymus Galle or Hieronymus Galle I or the Elder (1625 in Antwerp – 1679 in Antwerp) was a Flemish painter, who specialized in still lifes of fruit and flowers and hunting pieces. He collaborated with his fellow painters on garland paintings, i.e. paintings showing a garland of flowers or fruit around a devotional image or portrait.

== Life ==
Hieronymus Galle was the son of Elizabeth Claessens and Huibrecht Galle, Antwerp's envoy to the court in Brussels.

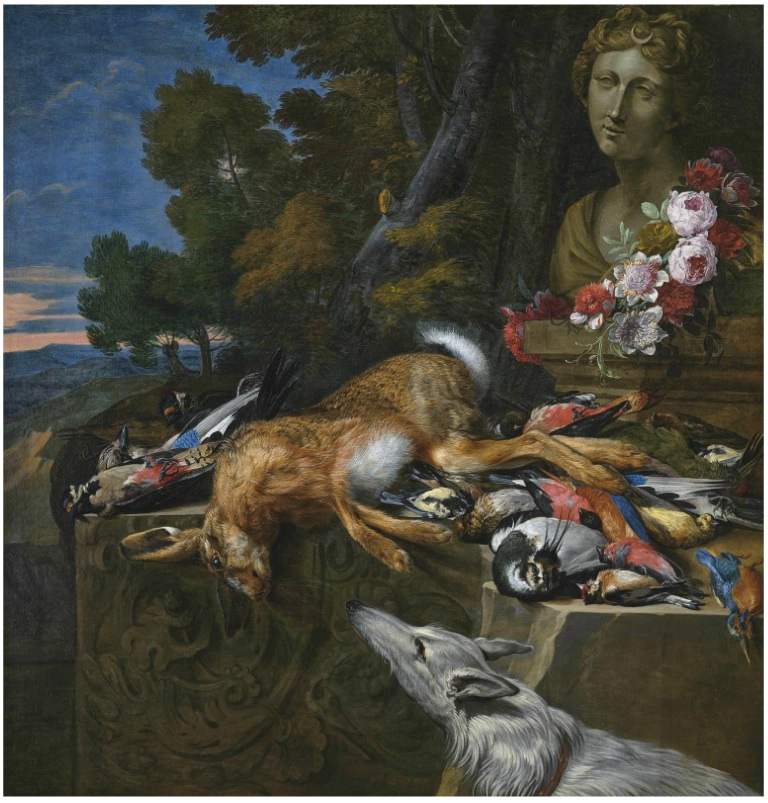
A hare and songbirds on a stone ledge

He was a pupil of Abraham Hack, who also taught the prolific Jan van den Hecke. He joined the Antwerp Guild of St. Luke in 1636 and became master in 1645–46.

He travelled to Italy and was documented in Rome in 1661–1662. He shared lodgings in Rome with his compatriot Franciscus de Neve (II). After his stay in Rome he signed his works with the Italianized form of his name, Girolimo.

It is believed he had a career in Antwerp where the last record about Galle dates to 1679. There are further indications that he worked in Brussels where he joined the local Guild of Saint Luke.

== Work ==
=== General ===
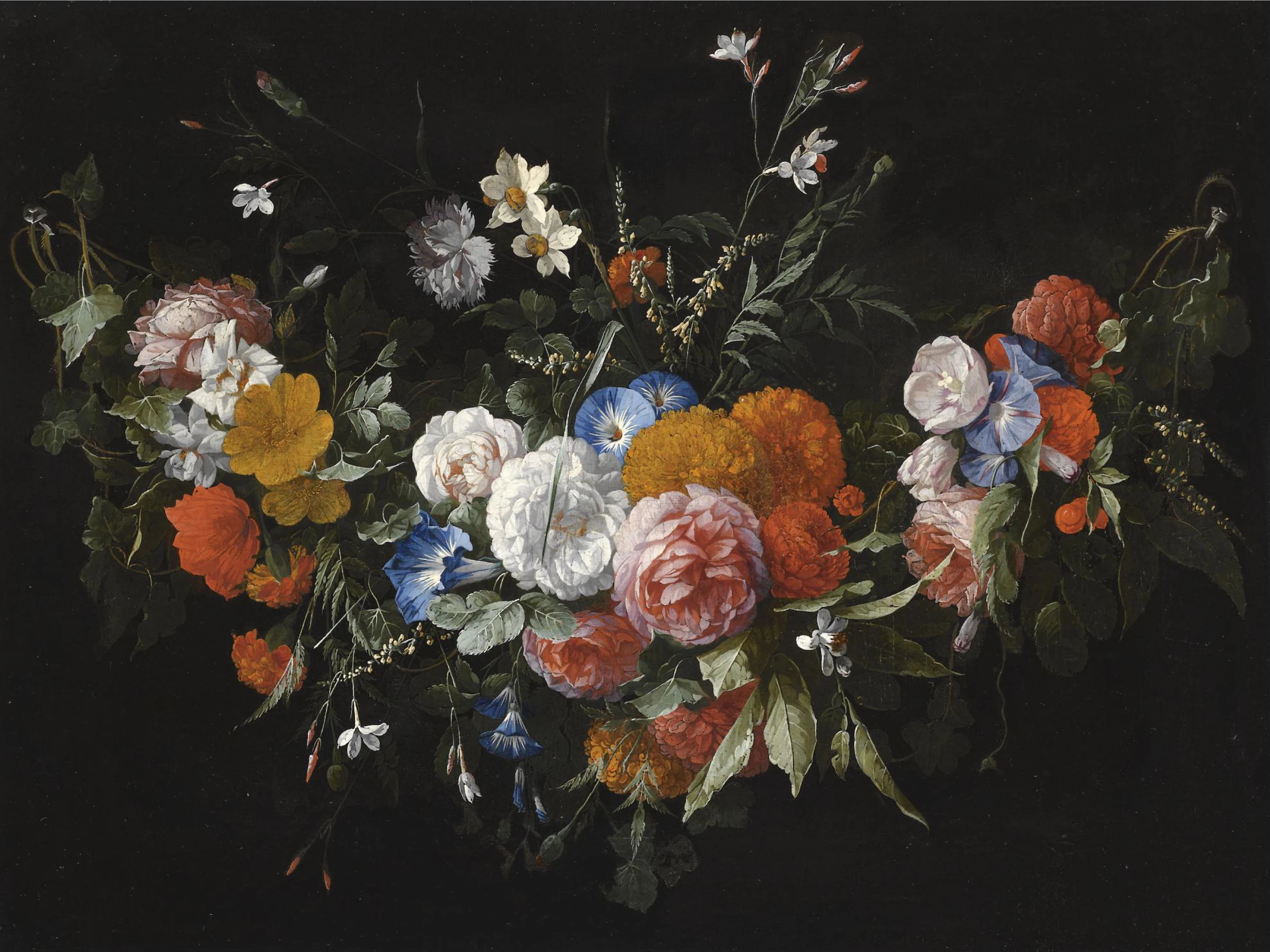
A swag of flowers

He was known mainly for his flower and fruit still lifes. He also painted hunting pieces and garland paintings. He is further known for vanitas paintings. About 15 signed and dated paintings executed between 1643 and 1680 are known.

=== Still lifes ===
He was initially a follower of the leading Antwerp flower painters Daniel Seghers and Jan Brueghel the Elder. While Seghers generally bathed his flowers in full light, Galle more typically relied on an animated play of light and shade in his compositions. In his palette he showed a preference for salmon-pink tonalities. In comparison to Seghers, Galle's work is more modern and his floral compositions are more dense and more picturesque in their conception.

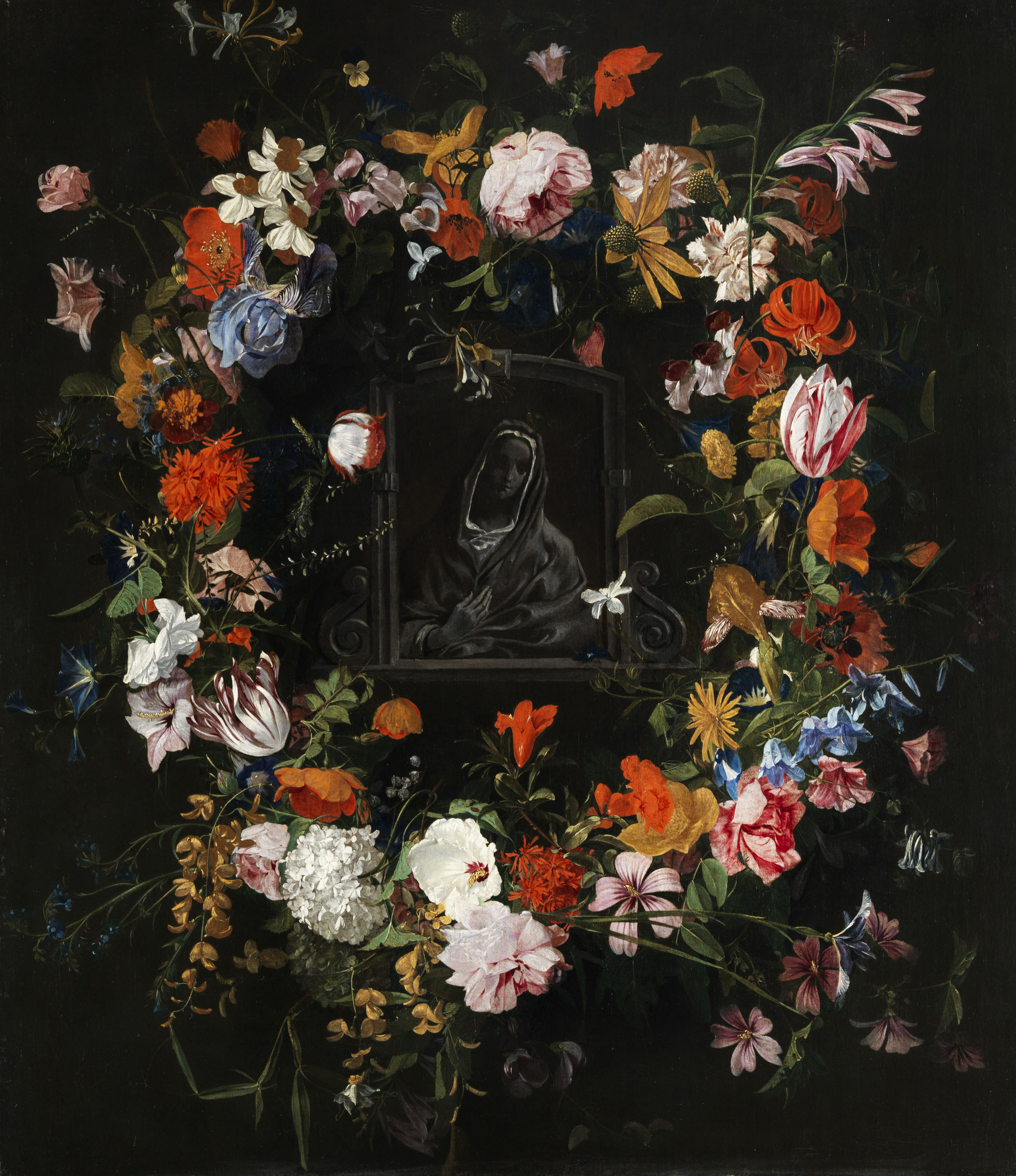
Madonna in a flower garland

His still lifes further show he absorbed Roman still life traditions of the mid-17th century. During his stay in Rome he would have been exposed to this tradition, which itself was influenced by Flemish still life painters such as Abraham Brueghel. The work of Italian artists such as Paolo Porpora and Michelangelo di Campidoglio may have been an influence on his work too.

A vanitas painting by his hand is kept in the collection of the Museum of Western and Oriental Art, Kyiv.

=== Garland paintings ===
He painted a number of paintings in the genre of garland paintings, a special type of still life developed in Antwerp by Jan Brueghel the Elder in collaboration with the Italian cardinal Federico Borromeo at the beginning of the 17th century. The genre was initially connected to the visual imagery of the Counter-Reformation movement. It was further inspired by the cult of veneration and devotion to Mary prevalent at the Habsburg court (then the rulers over the Southern Netherlands) and in Antwerp generally. Garland paintings typically show a flower garland around a devotional image, portrait or other religious symbol (such as the host). By the second half of the century secular themes such as portraits and mythological subjects also decorated the central part of the many paintings made in this fashion. Garland paintings are typically a collaboration between a figure painter and a flower painter.

Galle is known to have collaborated with Cornelis Schut on a garland painting referred to as A trompe l'oeil relief of the Pietà in a stone carved tondo, surrounded by festoons of flowers and thistles (Sold at Christie's on 11 May 2005 in Amsterdam lot 29).

Galle was likely an influence on the French still life painter Jean-Baptiste Monnoyer who resided in Antwerp for some time.
