= Fransen =

Fransen is a Dutch patronymic surname meaning "son of Frans". It can refer to:

- Frederic J. Fransen (born 1965), American philanthropy consultant
- Isaäc Dignus Fransen van de Putte (1822–1902), Dutch politician
- Jayda Fransen (born 1986), English Fascist politician
- Joeri Fransen (born 1981), Belgian pop singer
- Lieve Fransen (born 1950), Belgian civil servant and health activist
- Piet Fransen (1936–2015), Dutch footballer
- Remona Fransen (born 1985), Dutch athlete
- Roy Fransen (1916–1985), English high diver and stuntman
- Stephan Fransen (born 1988), Dutch tennis player

== See also ==
- Franssen, Dutch surname
