= Fraunceys =

Fraunceys is an English surname. Notable people with the surname include:

- Sewal Fraunceys (fl. 1380–1386), English politician
- Edward Fraunceys (c. 1566–1626), English politician

== See also ==
- Francis (disambiguation)
