= François Dominique =

François Dominique may refer to:

- François Dominique de Barberie de Saint-Contest
- François Dominique de Reynaud, Comte de Montlosier, French politician
- François Dominique (writer), French writer and translator

== Persons with the given name ==
- François Dominique Barreau de Chefdeville, French architect
- François-Dominique Toussaint Louverture, leader of the Haitian Rebellion
