= Jack Franses =

Jack Franses (1927–2010) was a world expert on Islamic art, carpets and textiles.

== Career ==
Franses was born in Ealing on 16 June 1927, to a Jewish family which had immigrated from Salonika in 1904.

He completed National Service in the British armed forces, and then fought for the Israelis in the 1948 Arab-Israeli War. He then began work as an art dealer, and in 1969, together with one of his brothers, set up the tapestry and carpet dealership "Franses of Piccadilly". In 1974 he was appointed consultant to the new carpet and textiles department at Sotheby's, in 1979 senior director for the Middle East and India, and in 1981 head of the new Islamic Art department.

His greatest asset was his perfect recall of almost every rug or textile he had ever seen. Both at Sotheby's and as a dealer, he advised numerous collectors, among them Metropolitan Museum of Art, and royalty such as Hussein of Jordan, Umberto II of Italy, and Fahd of Saudi Arabia. In 1974 he was involved in ascertaining the genuineness of a 16th-century rug bought from Sotheby's by J. Paul Getty for £22,000. Franses organised many successful sales across Europe and the Far East during his time at Sotheby's. During his tenure at Sotheby's Franses recorded that sales in Europe rose from £200,000 to £5.3 million. However in 1985 he overestimated the possibilities when, years ahead of his time, he organised an unsuccessful Sotheby's auction in Dubai. This led to his departure from the auction house and a return to the trade.

After leaving Sotheby's, Franses worked as an independent consultant, dealer, and expert witness. He died on 10 December 2010. His ashes are scattered under 'Jack's tree' in the Della Gherardesca Gardens in Firenze, his favourite city.

== Publications ==
- European and Oriental Rugs for Pleasure and Investment (1970; revised ed. 1973).
- Tribal Rugs from Afghanistan and Turkestan (1973).
- Tapestries and their Mythology (1973).
- Harrow, Leonard; Franses, Jack (structural analysis) (1987). From the lands of sultan and shah. London: Scorpion Pub. ISBN 0905906608.
- Harrow, Leonard; Franses, Jack (1996). The Riverbank Collection : silk rugs from Turkey and Persia. London: Scorpion Cavendish. ISBN 1900269104.

== Sources ==
- Obituary in the Daily Telegraph, February 3, 2011.
