= Francis I =

Francis I or Francis the First may refer to:

== People ==
=== Kings and emperors ===
- Francis I of France (1494–1547), King of France, reigned 1515–1547
- Francis I, Holy Roman Emperor (1708–1765), reigned 1745–1765
- Francis II, Holy Roman Emperor, also known as Francis I, Emperor of Austria, (1768–1835), reigned 1804–1835
- Francis I of the Two Sicilies (1777–1830), reigned 1825–1830

=== Dukes ===
- Francis I, Duke of Brittany (1414–1450), reigned 1442–1450
- Francis I, Duke of Saxe-Lauenburg (1510–1581), reigned 1543–1571
- Francis I, Duke of Nevers (1516–1561), reigned 1539–1561
- Francis I, Duke of Lorraine (1517–1545), reigned 1544–1545
- Francesco I de' Medici, Grand Duke of Tuscany (1541–1587), reigned 1574–1587
- Francesco I d'Este, Duke of Modena (1610–1658), reigned 1644–1658

=== Others ===
- Francesco I Gonzaga (1366–1407)
- Francis I of Beauharnais (died 1587), leading noble of the French House of Beauharnais
- Francis I Rákóczi (1645–1676), elected prince of Transylvania
- Francis I (Erbach-Erbach) (1754–1823), Count of Erbach
- Franz I, Prince of Liechtenstein (1853–1938)
- Pope Francis (1936–2025), leader of the Catholic Church from 2013 to 2025

== Media ==
- Francis the First (play), an 1832 play by Fanny Kemble
- Francis the First (film), a 1937 French historical comedy film
- Francis the First, an opera composed by Edward Loder

== See also ==
- Francesco I (disambiguation)
- Francisco I. Madero (1873–1913), Mexican revolutionary, writer and statesman; 37th president of Mexico
- Franz Joseph I, Prince of Liechtenstein
- Franz Joseph I of Austria
