= Francesc =

Francesc (Catalan pronunciation: [fɾənˈsɛsk, fɾanˈsesk]) is a masculine given name of Catalan origin. It is a cognate of Francis, Francesco, Francisco, François, and Franz. People with the name include:

- Cesc Fàbregas (Francesc Fàbregas i Soler) (born 1987), Spanish professional football player
- Francesc Antoni de la Dueña y Cisneros (1753–1821), Roman Catholic prelate; Bishop of Urgell 1797–1816
- Francesc Areny Casal (contemporary), Andorran politician
- Francesc Arnau (1975–2021), Spanish professional football player
- Francesc Bellmunt (born 1947), Spanish screenwriter and film director
- Francesc Berenguer i Mestres (1866–1914), Spanish Art Nouveau architect
- Francesc Cambó (1876–1947), Spanish politician, government minister, and artistic supporter
- Francesc Candel Tortajada (a.k.a. Paco Candel) (1925–2007), Spanish writer and journalist
- Francesc Capdevila (born 1956), Spanish artist and illustrator
- Francesc de Tamarit (1600–1653), Spanish politician and military leader during the Catalan Revolt
- Francesc Eiximenis (c. 1340–1409), Spanish Franciscan priest, encyclopedist, and writer
- Francesc Ferrer i Guàrdia (1859–1909), Spanish Catalan free-thinker and anarchist
- Francesc Fontanella (1622–1685), Spanish poet, dramatist, and priest
- Francesc Gaset Fris (born 1947), Andorran sport shooter
- Francesc Layret (1880–1920), Spanish nationalist, politician, and lawyer; assassinated
- Francesc Macià (1859–1933), Spanish military officer and president of Catalonia
- Francesc Pi i Margall (Francisco Pi y Margall), Second President of the First Spanish Republic and Catalan romanticist writer
- Francesc Pujols (1882–1962), Spanish writer and philosopher
- Francesc Sabaté Llopart (1915–1960), Spanish anarchist; fought against the regime of Francisco Franco
- Francesc Santacruz i Artigas (fl. 1665–1721), Spanish sculptor
- Francesc Vicent Garcia (1582–1623), Spanish poet
- Francesc Vicent (1450–1512), Spanish author who wrote about chess
- Francesc Vilanova (1968–2014), Spanish professional football player and manager
- Francesc Xavier Butinyà i Hospital (1834–1899), Spanish missionary Jesuit, teacher, and writer
- François Arago (Francesc Joan Domènec Aragó) (1786–1853), French mathematician, physicist, astronomer, and politician
- Xesco Espar (Francesc Espar Moya) (born 1963), Spanish handball player and trainer
