= François Boucher (disambiguation) =

François Boucher may refer to:

- François Boucher (1703–1770), French painter
- Francois Boucher (art historian) (1885–1966), French art historian
- François Boucher (violinist) (1860 – c. 1936), Canadian violinist

== See also ==
- François Bouchet
