= Steve Franciscus =

PNG international rugby league footballer

Personal information
- Full name: Steven Franciscus
- Born: 21 August 1982 (age 43) Papua New Guinea

Playing information
Club
Years	Team	Pld	T	G	FG	P
	Canberra Raiders	0	0	0	0	0
Representative
Years	Team	Pld	T	G	FG	P
2007	Papua New Guinea	1	0	0	0	0
- Source: As of 3 July 2026

Steven Franciscus (born 21 August 1982) is a former Papua New Guinea rugby league footballer who played for the Canberra Raiders in the NRL. He had also played for the Papua New Guinea national rugby league team.

In October 2007, Franciscus represented Papua New Guinea in a 50-10 loss to Wales.

He was named in the Papua New Guinea training squad for the 2008 Rugby League World Cup but did not make the final side.

He has represented Queensland for under 19's, the Queensland Rangers and 47th Battalion side in the Toowoomba Rugby League.

He currently plays for the Dalby Diehards in Dalby Queensland and lives with his wife, Naomi and their three children.
