= Frans Johansson =

American writer and public speaker (born 2000)

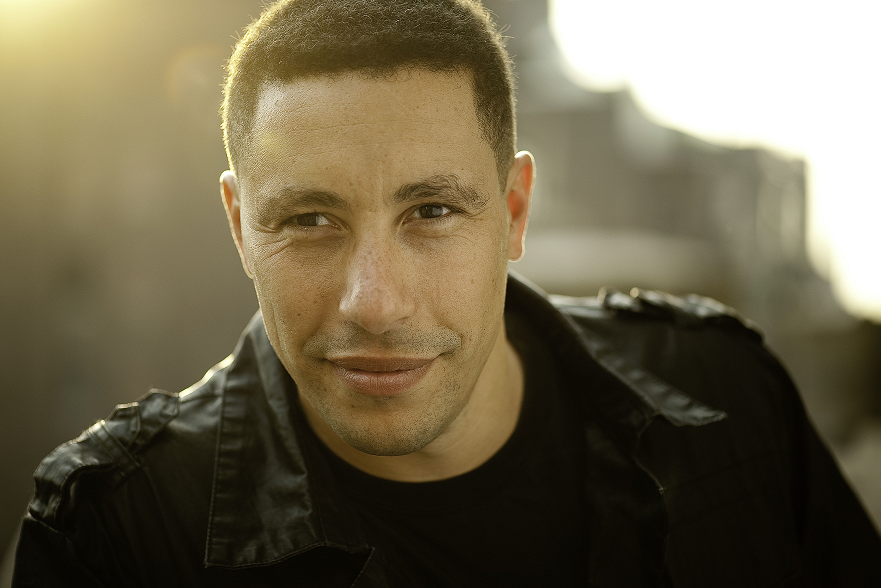
- Education: Master of Business Administration; Bachelor of Environmental Science
- Alma mater: Harvard Business School; Brown University
- Occupations: Writer entrepreneur Public Speaker
- Employer(s): CEO, The Medici Group
- Notable work: The Medici Effect; The Click Moment
- Website: fransjohansson.com

Frans Johansson is an American writer, entrepreneur, and public speaker. He is the author of The Medici Effect. He is also the author of The Click Moment, a 2012 book that discusses the role of luck and serendipity in personal lives and in business. He is the CEO of The Medici Group, a consultancy firm that promotes innovation through diversity.

Johansson is considered an authority on the topics of diversity, innovation, and creativity and has spoken at business events and conferences of each topic. He has appeared on national media and in publications that include Black Enterprise, Diversity Executive, Anderson Cooper 360°, and CNBC's The Business of Innovation.

== Early life and education ==
Johansson was born and raised in Lerum, Sweden. His father is Swedish and his mother African-American/Cherokee. As a child he had diverse interests which include fishing and role playing games such as Dungeons & Dragons. Johansson earned his bachelor's in Environmental Science at Brown University and then enrolled at Harvard Business School where he obtained his Master of Business Administration. While at Brown, Johansson founded The Catalyst, a science-inspired journal that publishes artwork, prose, and poetry.

== Career ==
After graduating from Harvard, Johansson founded two companies. The first was Dola Health Systems LLC, which manufactures and sells healthcare equipment. The company is best known for bringing the Painometer, a handheld pain assessment, to the market. He also the founder of Inka.net.

Johansson is the author of The Medici Effect: Breakthrough Insights at the Intersection of Ideas, Concepts, and Cultures, published in 2004 by Harvard Business School Press. The book was a best-seller and translated in 18 different languages, Harvard Business School professor Clayton M. Christensen stated that The Medici Effect is "One of the most insightful books on innovation I have ever read." It was the foundation for use of "Medici Effect", a term that is now used in various industries. The book looks at examples of how painters, sculptors, poets, philanthropists, scientists, philosophers, financiers, and architects shaped historical eras of innovation. The concept is that innovation happens when disciplines and ideas intersect.

Johansson wrote a second book, The Click Moment: Seizing Opportunity in an Unpredictable World, published by Penguin Portfolio in 2012. The book discusses how luck and serendipity play a large role in success and how to seize opportunities, debunking the 10,000-hour rule and how it should not apply to business.

Johansson's ideas and principles have led to a public speaking career, appearing at numerous conferences on business and diversity. He has also appeared on national media and in publications that include Black Enterprise, Diversity Executive, Anderson Cooper 360°, and CNBC's The Business of Innovation. Johansson is also founder and CEO of The Medici Group, a strategy and innovation consultancy firm.

=== Bibliography ===
Publication year	Title	Original publisher	ISBN	Notes
2012	The Click Moment: Seizing Opportunity in an Unpredictable World	Penguin Portfolio	ISBN 1591844932	
2004	The Medici Effect: Breakthrough Insights at the Intersection of Ideas, Concepts, and Cultures	Harvard University Press	ISBN 1591391865	Best-seller in 2004 as well as a Top 10 Business Book by Amazon.com
