= Lefrançois =

Lefrançois or LeFrançois (French pronunciation: [lə fʁɑ̃swa]) is a surname of French origin. Notable people with the surname include:

- Anne-Marie LeFrançois (born 1977), Canadian skier
- Cathy LeFrançois (born 1971), Canadian professional bodybuilder
- Charles Lefrançois (born 1972), Canadian Olympic high jumper
- J.-Eugène Lefrançois (1896–1979), Québécois industrialist and politician
- Laurent Lefrançois (born 1974), French composer
- Marc LeFrançois (born 1939), Canadian business executive; former president and CEO of Via Rail Canada
- Nicolas Lefrançois (1794–1866), Canadian surveyor
- Nicolas Lefrançois (cyclist) (born 1987), French cyclist
- Roselyne Lefrançois (born 1950), French politician
- Sabrina Lefrançois (born 1980), French Olympic figure skater

== See also ==
- Gustave Lefrançais (1826–1901), French revolutionary
