= François Caron (disambiguation) =

François Caron (1600–1673) was a French Huguenot refugee to the Netherlands who served the Dutch East India Company and explored Japan.

François Caron may also refer to:

- François Caron (politician) (1766–1848), representative of Saint-Maurice in the Legislative Assembly of Lower Canada
- François Caron (historian) (1931–2014), French economic historian
- François Caron (actor), French cinema and television actor
- François Caron (French Navy officer) (born 1937), French Navy officer and historian
