= Francesco Bernardi =

Francesco Bernardi may refer to:

- Senesino (1686–1758), Italian castrato singer
- Francesco Bernardi (painter), 17th century Veronese painter
