= François Aubry (disambiguation) =

François Aubry (1747–1798) was a French soldier who became a member of the National Convention of France during the French Revolution.

François Aubry may also refer to:

- François Xavier Aubry (1824–1854), French Canadian merchant and explorer of the American Southwest
- Louis-François Aubry (1767–1851), French painter
