= Margot Franssen =

Canadian businessman and founder of The Body Shop Canada

- Born: March 21, 1952 (age 73); Netherlands
- Known for: President of The Body Shop Canada
- Awards: Order of Canada

Margot Franssen, OC (born March 21, 1952) is a philanthropist, activist and former Canadian entrepreneur, the founder, partner and president of The Body Shop Canada. During the years that she ran and co-owned the Body Shop with her husband Hall "Quig" Tingley and her sister Betty-Ann Franssen the company raised more than $1.3 million for violence prevention and recovery programs in Canada. They led their team in using innovative communication techniques to achieve a brand recognition just behind McDonald's Restaurants Canada building a strong awareness without the use of traditional advertising. In 2004 The Body Shop Canada was sold to Body Shop International. Franssen is now a leading voice on the issues of funding women's rights and social justice for women and girls.

Born in the Netherlands, she received a Bachelor of Arts degree in 1979 from York University, her major was Philosophy. Franssen holds an honorary Doctor of Human Letters from Mount Saint Vincent University and a Doctor of Laws, Honoris Causa from the University of Windsor. Franssen is a Fellow of Ryerson Polytechnical University and was the Allard Chair in Business at Grant MacEwan College.

Franssen currently serves on the board of Goldcorp Inc. and in 2016 co-founded The Canadian Centre To End Human Trafficking, co-chairing the board. She also sits on the advisory board of the Mother Turtle Lodge and is an honorary board member of York University.

In 2014 Franssen co-chaired the National Task Force on Sex Trafficking of Canadian Girls. Since 1993 she has served on the board of the Canadian Women's Foundation, serving as chair for 6 years. Franssen is a past board member of CIBC bank (15 years) and has also served on the boards of Women Moving Millions, Women's College Hospital, the advisory committee for the Dalai Lama's Visit to Canada, The World Wildlife Fund, The Salvation Army Advisory Board, Toronto Family Service Association, Outward Bound, York University Foundation, and Women's Funding Network. From 1991 to 2003, she served on the Board of Governors of York University. She has served on the Round Table on the Environment and the Economy as well as the International Human Rights Jury.

Franssen served as the co-chair of Women Moving Millions, a break through organization raising million dollar gifts for the advancement of women and girls. She has been a co-chair of York University's Campaign, a campaign leader for the Salvation Army Capital Campaign and was the co-chair of the Canadian Women's Foundation Endowment Campaign.

In 2002, Franssen was made an Officer of the Order of Canada and received the Queen's Diamond and Golden Jubilee Award. Franssen received the United Nations Grand Award for addressing an issue of vital concern (Violence Against Women) to the UN and was their guest speaker at the World Conference of Women in Beijing in 1995.

In 2015 Franssen received The International Alliance for Women World of Difference 100 award, in 2013 the Twenty-One Leaders for the Twenty First Century and in 2011 Top 25 Women of Influence in Canada. In 2004, she was awarded the United Nations Development Fund for Women Canada Award, given "for outstanding contributions towards the advancement of women". .An award is named after her at MicroSkills, the Margot Franssen Leadership Award. Franssen received numerous awards over the years including the Yorktown Family Services Humanitarian Award for Community Service in 2008. Changing the Face of Philanthropy/Women's Funding Network, Outstanding Achievement in the Elimination of Violence/Muriel McQueen Ferguson Foundation to name a few.

Business awards include but are not limited to 100 Best Companies to Work for in Canada/Financial Post, 50 Best Managed Companies/Financial Post, Toronto's Top 20 Companies/Arthur Anderson, Financial Post Environment Award and the Marketing Communication Award/Retail Council of Canada.
