= Francis III =

Francis III may refer to:

- Francesco III Ordelaffi (1357–1405)
- Francis III of Brittany, Dauphin of France (1518–1536)
- Francesco III Gonzaga, Duke of Mantua (1533–1550)
- Francis I, Holy Roman Emperor, also Francis III, Duke of Lorraine (1708–1765)
- Francesco III d'Este, Duke of Modena (1737–1780)
