= Franciscus Titelmans =

Franciscan scholar

Franciscus "Frans" Titelmans (Latin: Franciscus Titelmannus or Hasseltensis) (1502–1537) was a Franciscan scholar from the Habsburg Netherlands, and an intellectual opponent of Erasmus.

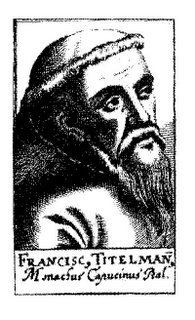
Franciscus Titelmans, 16th-century image.

== Life ==
He was born in Hasselt, and graduated M.A. at the University of Leuven in 1521. He was a dialectician influenced by Rudolph Agricola, and himself an influence on Petrus Ramus. He joined the Franciscan Order in 1523, and engaged in controversy with Erasmus over the interpretation of the Pauline Epistles in the period 1527 to 1530. He wrote a compendium on natural philosophy which was much reprinted.

He became a Capuchin in 1535 and moved to Italy, where he worked in a hospital for the incurably ill. He died at Anticoli di Campagna.

== Works ==
- Collationes quinque super Epistolam ad Romanos beati Pauli Apostoli (Antwerp, Willem Vorsterman, 1529, Available on Google Books and 1531 available via KU Leuven Special Collections.
- Libri duodecim de consyderatione rerum naturalium (Antwerp, Simon Cock, 1530).
- Tractatus de expositione mysteriorum missae (Antwerp, Willem Vorsterman, 1528 available via KU Leuven Special Collections and 1530, Available on Google Books.
- Elucidatio in omnes psalmos iuxta veritatem vulgatae (Antwerp, Martin Lempereur, 1531). Available on Google Books.
- Annotationes ex Hebræo atque Chaldæo in omnes Psalmos (Antwerp, Simon Cock, 1531).
