= Frans =

Frans is an Afrikaans, Danish, Dutch, Finnish, Icelandic, Norwegian, and Swedish given name, sometimes as a short form of François or Franciscus. One cognate of Frans in English is Francis.

== Given name ==
- Frans van Aarssens (1572–1641), Dutch diplomat and statesman
- Frans Ackerman (1330–1387), Flemish statesman
- Frans Adelaar (born 1960), Dutch football player and manager
- Frans Alphons Maria Alting von Geusau (born 1933), Dutch legal scholar and diplomat
- Frans Aerenhouts (1937–2022), Belgian cyclist
- Frans Ananias (born 1972), Namibian footballer
- Frans Andersson (1911–1988), Danish bass-baritone
- Frans Andriessen (1929–2019), Dutch politician
- Frans Anneessens (1660–1719), Flemish protest leader
- Frans van Anraat (born 1942), Dutch businessman and convicted war criminal
- Frans Badens (fl. 1571–1618), Flemish painter
- Frans Bak (born 1958), Danish composer, choral conductor, saxophonist, and pianist
- Frans Decker (1684–1751), 18th-century painter from the Northern Netherlands
- Frans van Dooren (1934–2005), Dutch translator
- Frans-Andries Durlet (1816–1867), Belgian architect, sculptor and printmaker
- Frans Fiolet (born 1939), Dutch field hockey player
- Frans Floris (1517–1570), Flemish painter
- Frans Christiaan Frederiks (born 1980), Dutch rapper and hip hop artist Lange Frans
- Frans Geurtsen (1942–2015), Dutch footballer
- Frans Geysen (1936–2026), Belgian composer
- Frans Gommers (1917–1996), Belgian footballer
- Frans Grootjans (1922–1999), Belgian politician and minister for the PVV
- Frans Grönlund (born 2000), Finnish footballer
- Frans Hals (1580–1666), Dutch painter
- Frans Helmerson (born 1945), Swedish cellist, pedagogue, and conductor
- Frans Hogenberg (1535–1590), Flemish and German painter, engraver, and mapmaker
- Frans Hogenbirk (1918–1998), Dutch football midfielder
- Frans Alfons Janssens (1865–1924), Belgian priest and biologist
- Frans Johansson (born 2000), American writer and public speaker
- Frans Krätzig (born 2003), German footballer
- Frans Körver (1937–2024), Dutch footballer
- Frans Lanting (born 1951), Dutch wildlife photographer and writer
- Frans August Larson (1870–1957), Swedish missionary to Mongolia
- Frans Maassen (born 1965), Dutch cyclist
- Frans Masereel (1889–1972), Belgian woodcut artist
- Frans Muller (born 1960/61), Dutch businessman
- Frans Alfred Meeng (1910–1944), Dutch-Indonesian footballer
- Frans Dhia Putros (born 1993), Danish professional football player
- Frans Anatolius Sjöström (1840–1885), Finnish architect
- Frans Stafleu (1921–1997), Dutch botanist
- François Steyn (born 1987), South African rugby player (called "Frans")
- Frans Thijssen (born 1952), Dutch football player
- Frans Timmermans (born 1961), Dutch politician
- Frans Van Vlierberghe (1954–2026), Belgian racing cyclist
- Frans de Vreng (1898–1974), Dutch track cyclist
- Frans de Waal (born 1948), Dutch primatologist
- Frans Wackers (born 1939), Dutch nuclear cardiologist
- Frans Jeppsson Wall (born 1998), Swedish singer (also known as Frans)

== Nickname ==
- Frans Bauer (born 1973), Dutch singer
- Francois Botha (born 1968), South African boxer and kickboxer
- Fran Escribá (born 1965), Spanish football player and manager
- Frans Harjawiyata (1931–2016), Indonesian Roman Catholic Trappist abbot
- Frans van Houten (born 1960), CEO of the Dutch company Philips
- Frans Kellendonk (1951–1990), Dutch novelist and translator
- Frans van der Lugt (1938–2014), Dutch Jesuit priest
- Frans Seda (1926–2009), Indonesian government minister in several departments
- Frans Xavery (1740–c. 1788), Dutch painter

== Surname ==
- Frédéric Frans (born 1989), Belgian footballer
- Jeffrey Frans (born 1952), South African cricketer
- Joe Frans (curler) (born 1975), Canadian curler
- Joe Frans (politician) (born 1963), Swedish politician

== Fictional characters ==
- Frans J. Palmu, main character of the Palmu novels and film adaptations

== See also ==
- Fransen
- Franz (given name)
