= Francesco I =

Francesco I may refer to:

== Persons ==
- Pope Francis (1936–2025, reigned 2013–2025), also known in Latin as Franciscus
- Francesco I Ordelaffi (c. 1300 – 1332)
- Francesco I of Lesbos (died 1384)
- Francesco I Crispo (died 1397)
- Francesco I Gonzaga (1366–1407)
- Francesco I Acciaioli (fl. 1451–1453)
- Francesco I Sforza (1401–1466)
- Francesco I d'Este, Duke of Modena (1610–1658)
- Francesco I of the Two Sicilies (1777–1830)

== Fictional characters ==
- Papa Francesco I, the fictional pope / character in the 1979 Walter Murphy novel Vicar of Christ

== See also ==
- Francis I (disambiguation)
