= Franciscus de Neve (II) =

Flemish painter and engraver

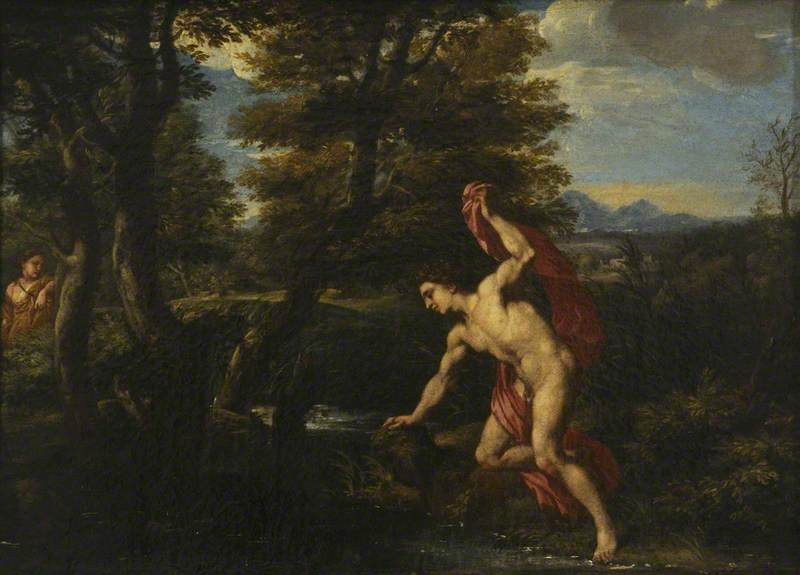
Narcissus and Echo

Franciscus de Neve (II) (also: Frans de (II) Neve, Fraciscus de Neuff, Francesco della Neve and nicknames: Bloosaerken and Blaserken) (1632 in Antwerp – after 1704) was a Flemish painter and engraver. He is known for his late Baroque religious and mythological scenes and landscapes. He had an international career in Italy, Southern Germany and Austria where he worked for aristocratic patrons and churches; He returned to his native Flanders later in his life.

== Life ==
Franciscus de Neve (II) was born in Antwerp where he was baptised on 23 February 1632. He was the son of Franciscus de Neve (I), who was also a painter. Because early biographers such as Arnold Houbraken and Jean-Baptiste Descamps did not realise that there were two artists named Franciscus de Neve, they confused and merged the lives of father and son and placed the father incorrectly in Rome after 1660. The confusion between the two artists still continues to this day. Only recently have art historians attempted to disentangle the biographies and oeuvres of father and son de Neve.

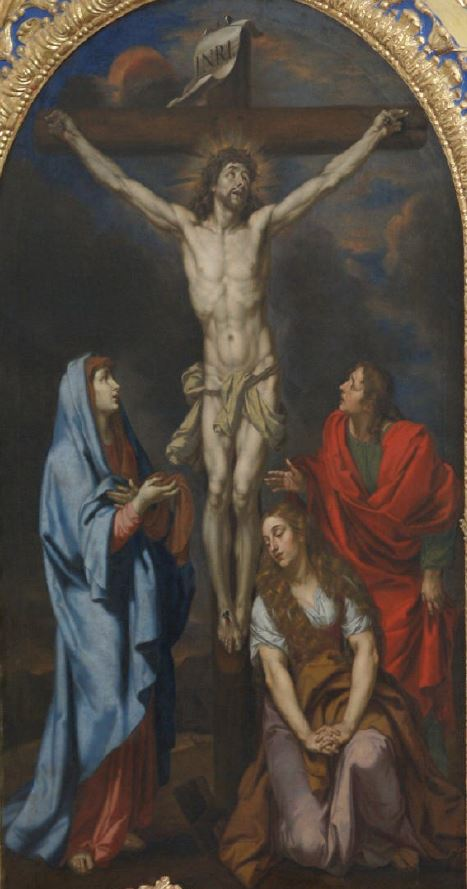
The crucifixion

There is no information about his training. He was in Rome from 1660 to 1670 where he became a member of the Bentvueghels, an association of mainly Dutch and Flemish artists working in Rome. It was customary for the Bentvueghels to adopt an appealing nickname, the so-called 'bent name'. De Neve received the bentname Bloosaerken (also written as Blaserken).

In Rome, he first lived with Pieter van Mander, then with Hieronymus Galle in 1661-1662 and later with Lodewijk Snaijers in 1665–1666. According to Houbraken he received praise while in Rome for his ability to paint according to nature. In 1661, he made paintings for the Palazzo Doria-Pamphili. This was a prestigious commission as he worked alongside prominent painters such as Pietro da Cortona. The Flemish painters Cornelis de Wael and Abraham Brueghel who were working in Rome at the time were also active as art dealers dealt in pictures of de Neve. They were instrumental in supporting the artist's career in Italy.

He was probably in Naples in the years 1667 and 1668. He left Italy for Germany where he worked in Augsburg and Munich. He then travelled to Austria where between the years 1669 and 1689 he painted altarpieces commissioned by the Archbishop of Salzburg and the Benedictine abbeys of Kremsmünster, Garsten and Admont. In Bavaria he painted altarpieces for the Archbishop of Passau during the years 1669 and 1689. He further spent time in what is now the Czech Republic from 1679 to 1681. Here he worked on a commission by Prince Karl Eusebius of Liechtenstein for an altarpiece in Moravia. He also acted as a restorer and trader for the Prince.

He returned to Antwerp in the late 1680s and became master in the local Guild of Saint Luke in 1690–1691. He died after 1704.

He was the teacher of Johannes Drue.

== Work ==
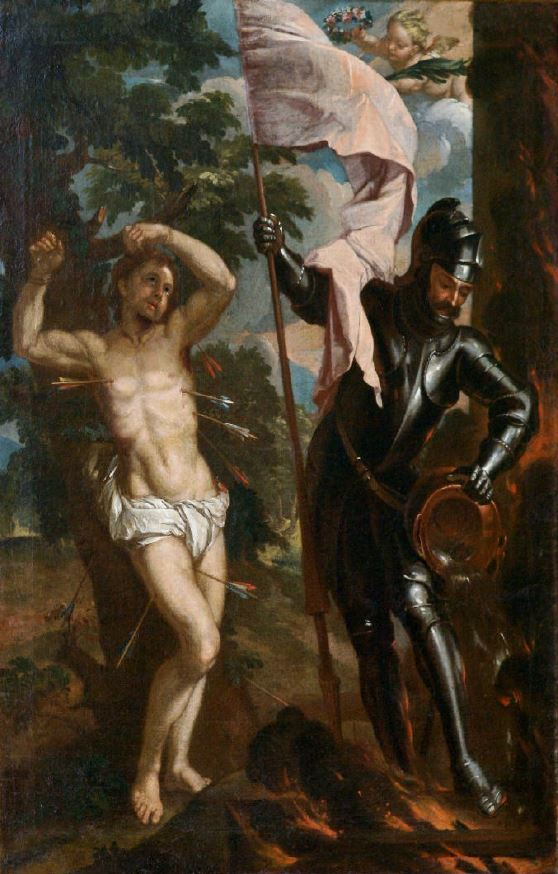
St Sebastian and St Floriane

Franciscus II is now mainly known for his altarpieces and mythological scenes although he also painted portraits. He also had a reputation as a landscape painter and his mythological scenes often include extensive landscapes in a style reminiscent of Claude Lorrain. An example is Narcissus and Echo (Christ Church, University of Oxford). The painter was already at the time of his stay in Rome known for his Roman landscapes and in particular for his detailed rendering of trees and foliage. Most of his landscapes are known only as engravings, few in their original oil version. A large number of small, unsigned landscapes has been handed down almost exclusively in engravings, which were made by Giovanni Giacomo de Rossi alla Pace in the 1660s in Rome. They found wide circulation and were already present in early collections.

His altarpieces are in a style, which mixes Flemish, Venetian and Roman classical models derived from Rubens, Raphael, Titian, Tintoretto, Poussin and Pietro da Cortona. Notable is the Flemish surface realism, a colouring in differentiated brown and red tones, which evolved to more red colours toward the 1680s and changed to a mellow tone with more pink colours towards the end of his residence in Central Europe. The colour schemes of his oil paintings as well as his portrait art, which has mainly been preserved in copper engravings, were highly regarded by his contemporaries.

On various grounds and in particular its provenance, the art historian Brigitte Fassbinder has argued that the painting Massacre of the Innocents attributed to Rubens and dated 1611-12 is in fact by de Neve.
