= Frederic J. Fransen =

American academic

Frederic John Fransen (born 1965) is an American academic. Although he first came to prominence as the author of The Supranational Politics of Jean Monnet, a study of Monnet's critical contributions to the foundations of the European Union, Fransen has in more recent years been more widely known as a consultant to—and advocate for—major donors to institutions of higher education in the United States. Both in his role as a provider of advice to clients (principally through his Indianapolis-based consultancy "Donor Advising, Research, & Educational Services") and in a more public way in his capacity as Executive Director of the non-profit Center for Excellence in Higher Education, he has to a significant degree raised awareness of the problem that gifts to colleges and universities are at times used in ways that are not in accordance with the intentions of the donors. Fransen also writes and speaks on the need for more general structural reform in higher education. He also serves as a Visitor of Ralston College, a start-up liberal arts college in Savannah. He holds a doctorate in Social Thought from the University of Chicago and was formerly the Director of Higher Education Programs at The Philanthropy Roundtable and a Senior Fellow of the Liberty Fund.

== See also ==
- Philanthropy in the United States
- Higher education in the United States
- History of the European Union
