= Franci =

Franci may refer to:

- the Franks, a West Germanic people first attested in the 3rd century
- Franci Kek (born 1964), a Slovenian politician
- Franci Litsingi, an alternative spelling for Francis Litsingi
- Franci Petek (born 1971), a Slovenian geographer and former ski jumper
- Adolfo Franci (born 1895), an Italian screenwriter
- Franci (footballer) (born 1990), Valmir Aparecido Franci de Campos Júnior, Brazilian footballer

Species Latin name

- Elaphoidella franci, a species of crustacean endemic to Slovenia
