= Francesco Bilotto =

American designer

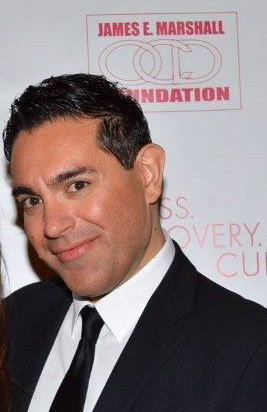
Francesco Bilotto

Francesco Bilotto (born August 30, 1981) is a television design and entertaining expert, contributing to many media sources. Currently seen as a re-appearing guest on national network news morning programs as well as daytime entertainment talk shows, he also has a self-titled segment "The Francesco Fix" on NBC New York.

== Early years ==
Francesco Bilotto was born to Italian descent parents and raised in Kenosha, Wisconsin. Bilotto spent his childhood living with his mother in a Cape Cod home on Lake Michigan's shoreline, which is where his love for design and passion for natural beauty began.

== Career ==
Francesco has appeared on ABC The View and NBC Today Show, and is a TODAY Tastemaker, He has also appeared on New York Live, WNBC New York, and Good Morning America ABC Television Network. Bilotto has also had mentions in Closer Weekly, People magazine and other national publications. Bilotto has worked as a free-lance creative consultant to Discover Wisconsin, a program showcasing the state and its vast landscape, locals and historical sites. In 2000, he lived in Chicago and volunteered his talents to Equality Illinois. In 2009 Bilotto moved to San Francisco, California, in pursuit of inspiration and extending his brand on a national level which then brought him to his current home of New York City in 2011. In addition to his broadcast career, Bilotto keeps a private client list including Manhattan socialites, many well known celebrities and Wall Street dwellers.

== Personal life ==
Bilotto resides in Manhattan, New York.
