= François Baby =

François Baby may refer to:

- François Baby (businessman) (1733–1820), businessman and politician in Lower Canada
- François Baby (legislative councillor) (1794–1864), seigneur, businessman, and legislative councillor in Lower Canada, son of the first
- François Baby (politician) (1768–1852), political figure in Upper Canada, nephew of the first
