= Francesco Barbaro =

Francesco Barbaro may refer to:

- Francesco Barbaro (politician) (1390–1454), Italian politician, diplomat and humanist from Venice
- Francesco Barbaro (patriarch of Aquileia) (1546–1616), Venetian diplomat and Italian Catholic bishop
- Francesco Barbaro (Castanu) (1927–2018), boss of the 'Ndrangheta, a Mafia-type criminal organisation based in Calabria, Italy
