= Franciscus de Neve (I) =

Flemish painter

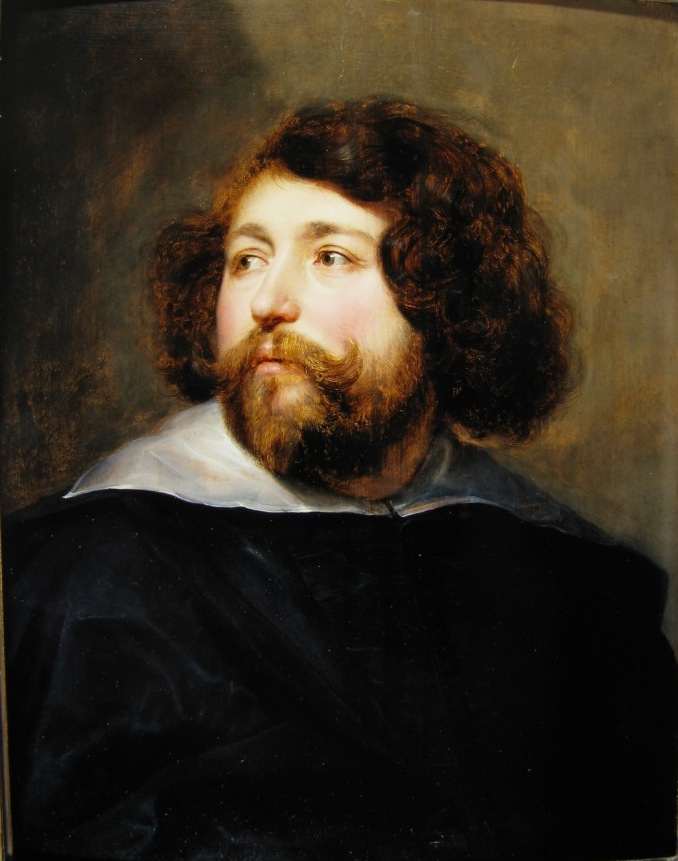
Portrait of a man, possibly Andreas Colyns de Nole

Franciscus de Neve (I) (1606 in Antwerp – 1681 or 1688 in Antwerp or Brussels) was a Flemish painter of history paintings, landscapes and portraits.

== Life ==
Franciscus de Neve was born in Antwerp as the son of Guilleaume de Neve, a sculptor, and Maike or Anna Vermeuren. He was baptized in the Cathedral of Our Lady in Antwerp on 11 June 1606.

There is no information about his training. He possibly traveled to Rome in the years 1620 -1630. He became a master in the Antwerp Guild of St Luke in 1629–1630. He married Francisca Wortelmans, daughter of the painter Adriaan Wortelmans, on 13 March 1630. Nothing is known about his activities after 1640.

His brothers Cornelis and Simon were, respectively, a sculptor and portrait painter. He was the father of Franciscus de Neve (II), who was also a painter.

Because early biographers such as Arnold Houbraken and Jean-Baptiste Descamps did not realise that there were two artists named Franciscus de Neve, they confused and merged the lives of father and son and placed the father incorrectly in Rome after 1660.

== Work ==
Franciscus de Neve first gained a reputation in his hometown Antwerp with his history paintings. It is not clear whether he worked like most Antwerp painters of his time on some of the large commissions of the Rubens workshop in the 1630s. Very few works are attributed to him.

He painted portraits. A monogrammed Portrait of a man dated 1635 (with Otto Naumann Ltd) shows the influence of the contemporary Flemish masters Peter Paul Rubens and Anthony van Dyck.
