= François Amoudruz =

French resistance fighter (1926–2020)

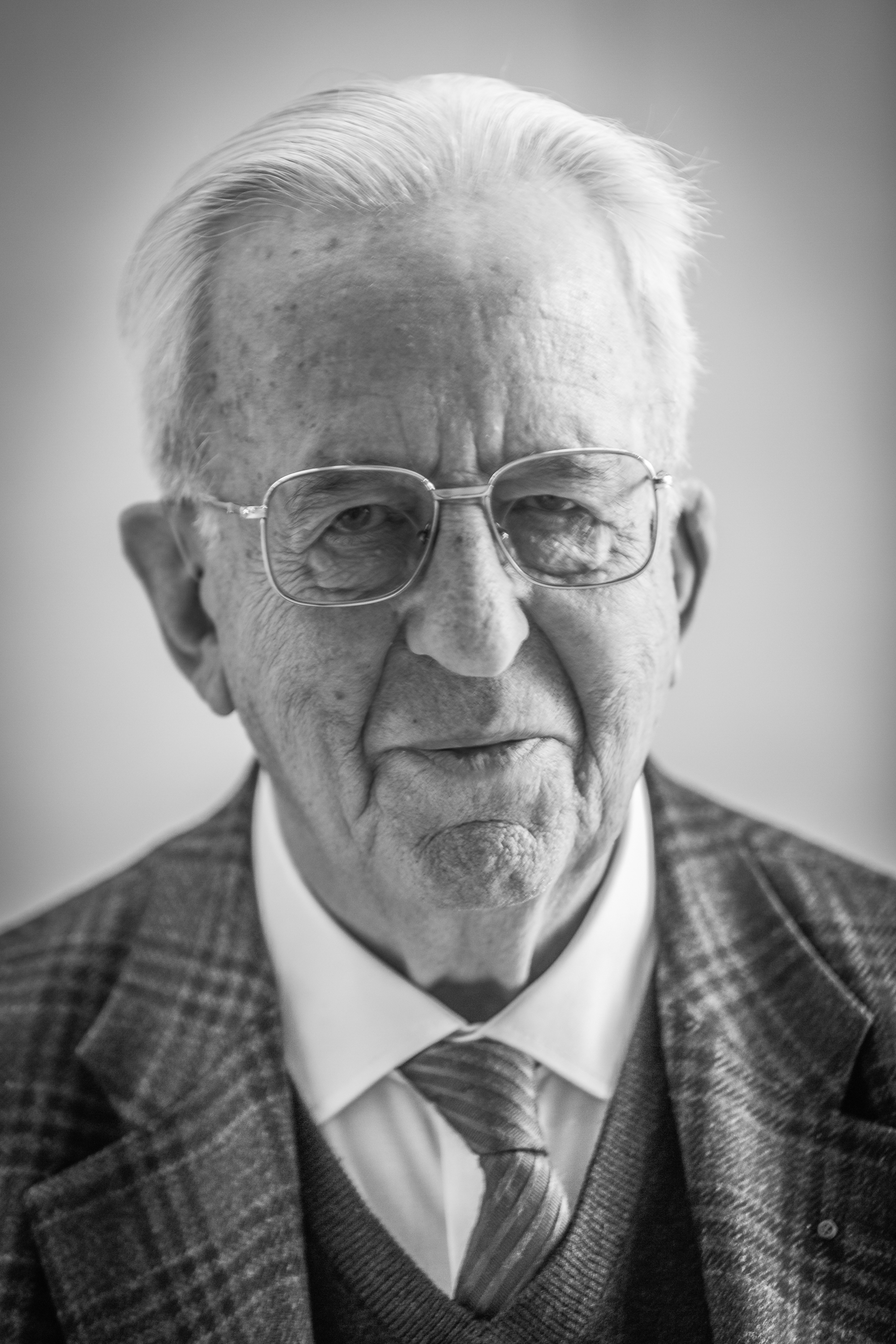
- François Amoudruz (2013)
- Born: 7 September 1926; Albertville, France
- Died: 21 July 2020 (aged 93); Schiltigheim, France
- Occupation: Resistant

François Amoudruz (7 September 1926 – 21 July 2020) was a member of the French Resistance during World War II.

== Biography ==
Amoudruz was born in Albertville on 7 September 1926. His father was Director of Contributions Directes et du Cadastre. His mother was a teacher in upper secondary school. He was the younger brother of Madeleine Rebérioux. He began living in Auvergne in 1934, where his father was transferred for work. He was involved in Scouting with the Éclaireuses et Éclaireurs de France in Clermont-Ferrand.

Amoudruz entered the law school in Clermont-Ferrand. However, on 25 November 1943, the Gestapo raided the school and Amoudruz was taken as a hostage after having just turned 17. In December 1943, he was held captive at the Royallieu-Compiègne internment camp. He left the camp on 17 January 1944, being deported to the Buchenwald concentration camp. He was eventually locked up at the Flossenbürg concentration camp on 23 February 1944. He was assigned to the special commando of Johanngeorgenstadt, where he was forced to work on the production of Messerschmitt aircraft.

Amoudruz escaped during a death march in April 1945, but was captured and sent back to camp. However, he would be freed by Allied Forces on Victory in Europe Day. He returned to France on 24 May 1945.

He resumed his law studies in Strasbourg in 1947 and earned his degree. He started as a trainee lawyer with the Strasbourg bar before working in the Strasbourg public prosecutor's office.

Starting in 1950, Amoudruz was involved with a number of associations devoted to keeping the memory of the Holocaust alive. He gave numerous talks in schools and universities.

He was Deputy President of the Fédération nationale des déportés et internés résistants et patriotes until 2013 and was vice-president of the Fondation pour la Mémoire de la Déportation. He was also a member of the European Centre on Resistance and Deportation and the Concours national de la resistance et de la déportation.

François Amoudruz died on 21 July 2020 in Schiltigheim at the age of 93.

== Distinctions ==
- Political deportation and internment medal
- Resistance Medal (1947)
- Commander of the Legion of Honour (2016)

== Publications ==
- Le Struthof, le seul camp de concentration en France (1995)
- Allocution-témoignage prononcée à l’Université de Strasbourg lors de la cérémonie commémorative du 25 novembre 2010 (2011)
