= MHH Franssen =

Dutch lawyer (1903–1987)

Maximiliaan Henricus Hubertus Franssen (born 28 March 1903, Roermond – 5 juli 1987) was a Dutch lawyer. In 1941, he was appointed by the Nazis to act as curator (Verwalter) of enemy properties during the Nazi occupation of The Netherlands in World War II. As a Verwalter, Franssen took control of—and in many 23 cases liquidated—estates, businesses, political parties, and other organizations owned or controlled by persons or organizations designated by the Nazis as enemies, or otherwise deemed unworthy or unnecessary. Dutch National Archive documents indicate that Franssen was assigned as Verwalter for nearly 60 estates and businesses. Specific private estate examples include seizing control of the Larsen estate. and Stodel estate.

Also Franssen liquidated numerous organizations, including the RKSP (Roman Catholic State Party), St. Jozefsgezellenvereniging (St. Joseph's Society), Vrouwen van Nazareth (Women of Nazareth), the Nederlandse Verenigen van Huisvrouwen (Dutch Association of Housewives), Vrijzinnig Democratische Bond (Liberal Democratic Union), Christelijke Democratische Unie (Christian Democratic Union), and Nederlandse Militaire Bond (Dutch Military League).

== Before the War ==
Prior to the war, Franssen was a captain in the Dutch Army. He was accused of—but later denied—desertion during the Battle of the Grebbeberg in May 1940.

== After the War ==
After the war, Franssen was tried and convicted by a Dutch postwar "special court of justice" and imprisoned from 5 May 1945, until 29 May 1948, including one year in the prison at Scheveningen. In December 1948 he was convicted in the Civil Court of Rotterdam (Strafprocess, or penal case, number #16439/1947) of enemy collaboration due to his role in liquidation of political parties, in particular the RKSP, and sentenced to three (3) years (the prosecution had asked for 4). On January 13, 1949, upon learning of the court's ruling, the mayor of Eindhoven (and RKSP Party Secretary 7 years earlier, at the time of liquidation), Hans Kolfschoten, sent a letter to Mr. Hollander, the prosecutor in the case, writing "...the court has been mild" and in Kolfschoten's firsthand knowledge, Franssen was "glad als slijm" (slippery as mucous). These comments are notable as Kolfschoten was a respected postwar figure in The Netherlands—in 1946 he served as Minister of Justice in the Schermerhorn-Drees cabinet, in 1949 he served in the Dutch Senate, and in 1957 he was elected Mayor of The Hague.

== Larsen Estate ==
To understand Franssen's legacy as a Verwalter in the occupied Netherlands, and his involvement with Nazi occupation authorities, it's useful to examine a specific example.

In 1923 Hans Ludwig Larsen co-founded Wijgula (Wijnhoff & Van Gulpen & Larsen, B.V.) a shipping company that to this day transports chemicals on the Rhine and other inland rivers. Wijgula was later acquired in 1991 by Imperial Reederei (known as Haniel Reederei at the time), in turn owned by Imperial Logistics GmbH. in turn owned by Imperial Group, Imperial Group's 2010 Annual Report shows 100% control of Wijgula, and its fleet increased to 37 tankers after the launch of the Synthese 11.

Larsen died in November 1937, leaving his estate to his wife Suzanne Menzel Larsen and his two children, Harold and Ingrid. In July 1939—less than one year prior to the German invasion of the Netherlands—the widow Larsen and her children emigrated to the United States, leaving administration of the Larsen estate, including Wijgula, in the hands of five (5) executors: Mr. BP Gomperts, Mr. GA van Haeften, Mr. JWC van Steeden, Dr. C. Herzfeld and Mr. C. Koch. Prior to leaving, Ms. Larsen loaned 32 Larsen Collection artworks the Lakenhal Museum in Leiden. Under Nazi policy during the occupation, the property of Dutch citizens living on US soil was considered "Feindvermögen", or enemy property, and in late 1942 Franssen arranged to sell the Lakenhal 32 via the auction house Van Marle & Bignell. About 10 days before the auction occurred, on 14 January 1943, twelve (12) artworks were purchased privately by Erhard Göpel, a Nazi art buyer participating in the overall Nazi effort to confiscate European artwork for Hitler's planned "Führermuseum" in Linz. According to "Geroofd maar van wie?" (Looted, but from whom?), the "...business [of selling artwork at the behest of the occupying authorities] was going so well that Van Marle sold a part of the stock to clients in Germany under a private agreement." No evidence has been published showing that Franssen, de Lakenhal Museum, or Van Marle & Bignell paid either Göpel's private payment or the auction proceeds to the Larsen estate executors. One possible source of documentation on what Franssen did with these funds is the Van Marle & Bignell archive maintained by the Netherlands Institute for Art History (RKD) (archive number NL-HaRKD.0366).

== Relationship with Oceanus ==
Oceanus was a publishing company established by the occupying authorities in the Netherlands as a branch of the National Socialist company Mundi-Verlag in Berlin. Oceanus directors maintained direct relations with the German Foreign Ministry. Franssen is documented to have worked closely with Oceanus.

== Relationship with Hitler's Special Order Linz ==
Among Dutch traders who supplied Hitler and helped build the Special Order Linz collection, the auction house Frederic Muller & Co., art dealers Kurt Walter Bachstitz and Gustav Cramer, and Franssen were prominent contributors to Linz, each providing more than 20 paintings. Bachstitz was Jewish, and Dutch archive documentation indicates he was forced to sell to Nazi buyers. "Post-war statements indicate that Bachstitz and his wife held anti-Nazi sentiments and were dedicated to protecting Jews by offering them a place to hide and holding their goods in trust. From 1942, things apparently became more difficult for Bachstitz", and in July 1943, Bachstitz was arrested by the Sicherheitsdienst and briefly interned in Scheveningen prison.

== OSS Interrogation Reports ==
After the war, Franssen came to the attention of American intelligence officers in the OSS due to his Verwalter activities and his guidance of the collection of the German company Van Marle and Bignell.

== See also ==
- Postliminium
