= Francis V =

Francis V may refer to:

- Francis V of Beauharnais (1714–1800)
- Francis V, Duke of Modena (1819–1875)
