= Francis, Nebraska =

- Ghost Town
- Country: United States
- State: Nebraska
- County: Wheeler

Francis is a ghost town in Wheeler County, Nebraska, United States.

== History ==
A post office was established at Francis in 1883, and remained in operation until it was discontinued in 1917. Francis was likely named for an early settler.
