= Frans van Dooren =

Dutch translator (1934–2005)

Frans van Dooren (2 November 1934, in Ravenstein – 6 July 2005, in Oss) was a Dutch translator of Italian and Latin literature.
