= Francesc Santacruz i Artigas =

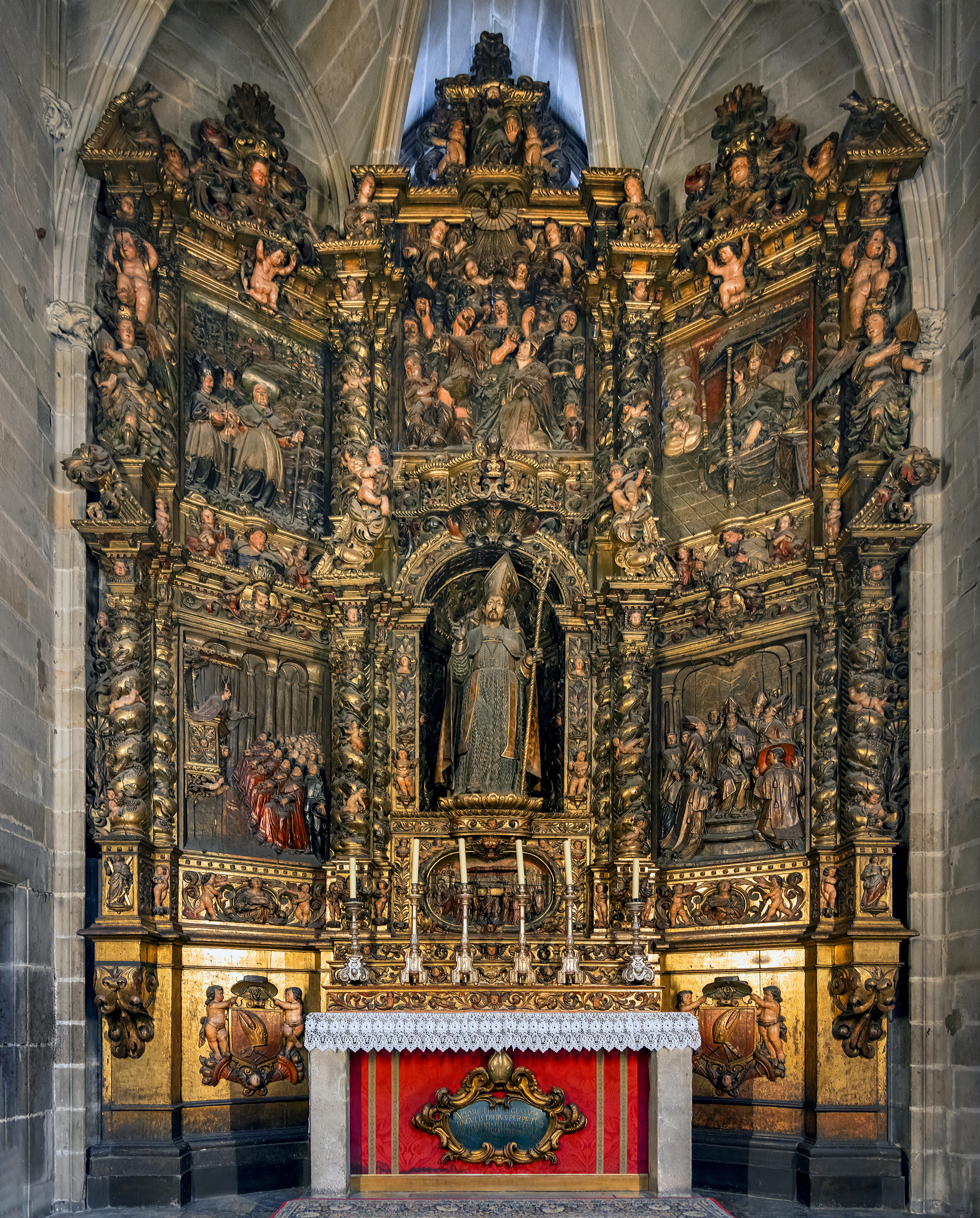
Altarpiece of Saint Severus (Sant Sever, San Severo). Cathedral of Barcelona.

Francesc Santacruz i Artigas was a Catalan sculptor of Baroque works. He was active between 1665 and 1721. From a family of sculptors, he worked in the studio of Pere Serra, which he entered in 1665. It is known that, with Domènec Rovira, he participated in the legal suit that demanded that a separate guild for sculptors be formed, and in 1680 Charles II of Spain allowed the creation of the Cofradía de los Santos Mártires escultores, which allowed sculptors to freely receive commissions for their works and expenses.

== Known works ==
- Altarpiece of Saint Severus (Sant Sever, San Severo). Cathedral of Barcelona.
- El Nacimiento. Principal facade of the church of Betlem. 1690 Barcelona.
- El Niño Jesús. Facade of la Rambla of the church of Betlem. 1690 Barcelona
- La Asunción de la Virgen Polychrome. Museu Diocesà de Lleida
