= Juan Benito Artigas Hernández =

Mexican architect

Juan Benito Artigas Hernández (born December 1, 1934, February 1, 2021) was an architect who was born in Spain but lived in Mexico since he was thirteen years old. Artigas held a PhD in architecture from National Autonomous University of Mexico (UNAM) and became a level 3 member of the National System of Researchers of CONACYT since 1999. Artigas worked as academician, researcher and restoration expert. His work is recognized for both his research on Mexican colonial and modern architecture.

== Life ==
Juan Benito Artigas Hernández was born on December 1, 1934, in Madrid, Spain. When the Spanish Civil War ended, he and his family moved to Barcelona. In 1947, when he was thirteen years old, he and his mother moved to Mexico at the request of his father who was already there. His mother, María Hernández Cebrian, was born in Coruña, Spain where she worked as secretary. He was close relative of Benito Artigas Arpón, a Republican union politician and diplomat of Republican government in Mexico.

At the age of thirteen, Juan Benito Artigas Hernández began to study at Academia Hispano-Mexicana. Later in 1965, he graduated National Autonomous University of Mexico in 1977 with degrees in architecture and art history, after completing a thesis on the Murales de Santa María Xoxoteco. Eleven years later, he received his doctorate in architecture from the same institution. His thesis was on Metztitlan.

== Career ==
=== Work in the private initiative ===
Juan Benito Artigas Hernández started his career in the private sector when he worked at Felix Candela office where he learned structural design and construction logic. Artigas and Candela worked closely on the construction of Bacardi plant. Artigas also worked at Constructora Marhnos and Tecton Construcciones, and he worked on his own in private buildings.

Artigas performance in public sector includes being head of the department of Cataloging Real State property and an adviser to the municipality of San Cristóbal de las Casas.

=== Work in academia ===
Since 1970 Artigas has focused his activity on teaching and research the Mexican colonial and modern architecture and restoration of monuments and historical sites, distinguishing himself in the restoration of murals. From 1979 to 1986, he was a coordinator of Curso Vivo del Arte conducted by UNAM which worked to share the artistic heritage of Mexico. Artigas' contributions to architecture include the theories of "dematerialization of the structure" and "incorporeal materiality of the expressive aesthetic space." These theories apply to Iberoamerican baroque. Artigas introduced a new architectural genre to architectural historiography, named "open chapels" which exhibits the importance of open sky architecture.

In 1994, he founded the interdisciplinary research seminar in colonial architecture. Later, in 1998, Artigas Hernández was appointed Emeritus Professor at National Autonomous University of Mexico. He has been a level 3 member of the National System of Researchers of CONACYT since 1999.

Artigas teaches at Benito Juarez Autonomous University of Oaxaca and he has both a special professorship Dr. Juan Benito Artigas at the National School of Conservation and Restoration Manuel del Castillo Negrete (School of Restoration of Churubusco) and a professorship at architecture undergraduate a graduate at UNAM.

He has traveled to learn about the historical architecture of Guatemala, Honduras, Bolivia, Venezuela, Colombia and Philippines.

=== Work in restoration ===
He worked on the restoration of several buildings in the center of Mexico City, especially on the Raza monument, and on the renovation of the historic areas in San Cristobal de las Casas, Chiapas. One of his last restorations was the monumental clock of Pachuca where he and his team performed more than 500 interventions on that piece.

=== Books and publications ===
Juan Benito Artigas Hernández has, as author and coauthor, about 25 publications. He has written five books: Centro Cultural Universitario. Visita guiada en torno a su arquitectura (1985), La Ciudad Universitaria de 1954. Un Recorrido a Cuarenta años de su Inauguración (1994), UNAM México. Guía de sitios y Espacios (2009), México Arquitectura del Siglo XVI (2010), Retablos de espejos. La desmaterialización de la estructura (2012), the exhibition brochure EXPO JUAN B. ARTIGAS 2012., and Chiapas Monumental. Atlas gráfico (2013).

His editorial work includes 19 issues of the magazine "Cuadernos de Arquitectura Virreinal" where studies about Mexico states like Oaxaca, Michoacan and Yucatán have been published.

=== Recognition ===
Artigas has received several recognitions, among which are Presea 2006 Merit for Research Architecture "Enrique del Moral Domínguez" granted by the Legion of National Honor, the medal Gabino Barrera and Mario Award Pani diffusion, the College of Architects of Mexico City B.C. (2007). He also has been recognized by the Spanish royal family as Commander of the Order of Isabella the Catholic, by the Government of Spain in 2004.

He was recognized as one of the 120 Ibero-American Historians of Art and Architecture through time by the Carolina Foundation of Spain and Architecture Documentation Centre based in Buenos Aires, Argentina.
