= São Francisco =

São Francisco (Portuguese for 'Saint Francis') may refer to:

== Places ==
=== Brazil ===
==== Populated places ====
===== Central-West =====
- São Francisco de Goiás, a municipality in Goiás

===== North =====
- São Francisco do Iratapuru, a village in Amapá
- São Francisco do Pará, a municipality in Pará
- São Francisco do Guaporé, a municipality in Rondônia

===== North-East =====
- Muquém de São Francisco, a municipality in Bahia
- São Francisco do Conde, a municipality in Bahia
- São Francisco do Brejão, a municipality in Maranhão
- São Francisco do Maranhão, a municipality in Maranhão
- São Francisco, Paraíba, a municipality in Paraíba
- Belém de São Francisco, a municipality in Pernambuco
- Lagoa de São Francisco, a municipality in Piauí
- São Francisco do Piauí, a municipality in Piauí
- São Francisco do Oeste, a municipality in Rio Grande do Norte
- São Francisco, Sergipe, a municipality in Sergipe
- Amparo de São Francisco, a municipality in Sergipe
- Canindé de São Francisco, a municipality in Sergipe
- Santana do São Francisco, a municipality in Sergipe
- São Francisco Square, Sergipe

===== South-East =====
- Barra de São Francisco, a municipality in Espírito Santo
- São Francisco, Minas Gerais, a municipality in Minas Gerais
- São Francisco de Sales, a municipality in Minas Gerais
- São Francisco do Glória, a municipality in Minas Gerais
- São Francisco de Itabapoana, a municipality in Rio de Janeiro
- São Francisco, Niterói, a neighborhood in Niterói, Rio de Janeiro
- São Francisco, São Paulo, a municipality in São Paulo

===== South =====
- São Francisco do Sul, a municipality in Santa Catarina

==== Rivers ====
- São Francisco River
- São Francisco River (Belo River)
- São Francisco River (Paraná)
- São Francisco River (Rio de Janeiro)
- São Francisco River (Jequitinhonha River)
- São Francisco River (São Miguel River)
- São Francisco River (Jaciparaná River)
- São Francisco River (Paraíba)

=== Cape Verde ===
- São Francisco, Cape Verde, a village
- São Francisco (Tarrafal de São Nicolau), a parish

== Other uses ==
- São Francisco Futebol Clube (PA), a football club in Santarém, Brazil
- TV São Francisco, a television station in Juazeiro, Bahia, Brazil
- Sao Francisco Craton, part of the Earth's crust in present-day Brazil
- St. Francis (disambiguation), several Roman Catholic saints

== See also ==
- São Francisco de Assis (disambiguation)
- São Francisco de Paula (disambiguation)
- San Francisco (disambiguation), the Spanish language equivalent of São Francisco, several different things including the city San Francisco in California, United States
- List of places named after Saint Francis
