= List of places named after Saint Francis =

The following is a list of places named after Saint Francis of Assisi.

== Africa ==
=== South Africa ===
- Cape St. Francis
- St. Francis Bay, a town in the Eastern Cape

== Americas ==
=== Argentina ===
- San Francisco, Córdoba
- San Francisco del Chañar, Córdoba
- San Francisco Pass, Catamarca
- San Francisco Solano, Buenos Aires Province

=== Bolivia ===
- Plaza San Francisco, La Paz

=== Brazil ===
- Amparo de São Francisco
- Barra de São Francisco
- Belém de São Francisco
- Canindé de São Francisco
- Lagoa de São Francisco
- Muquém de São Francisco
- Santana do São Francisco
- São Francisco, Minas Gerais
- São Francisco, Paraíba
- São Francisco, Sergipe
- São Francisco, São Paulo
- São Francisco de Assis, Rio Grande do Sul
- São Francisco de Assis do Piauí
- São Francisco do Brejão
- São Francisco do Conde
- São Francisco do Glória
- São Francisco de Goiás
- São Francisco do Guaporé
- São Francisco de Itabapoana
- São Francisco do Maranhão
- São Francisco do Oeste
- São Francisco de Paula, Minas Gerais
- São Francisco de Paula, Rio Grande do Sul
- São Francisco do Pará
- São Francisco do Piauí
- São Francisco de Sales
- São Francisco do Sul
- São Francisco River
- São Francisco, a neighbourhood in Niterói

=== Canada ===
- St. Francis Of Assisi Middle School in Red Deer, Alberta
- St. Francis of Assisi Catholic Church in Cornwall, Prince Edward Island

=== Colombia ===
- San Francisco, Putumayo

=== Costa Rica ===
- San Francisco de Coyote
- Colegio Seráfico San Francisco
- San Francisco de Dos Ríos

=== Dominican Republic ===
- San Francisco de Macorís

=== Ecuador ===
- San Francisco de Quito

=== El Salvador ===
- San Francisco Gotera

=== Mexico ===
- San Francisco Cajonos
- San Francisco Tetlanohcan
- San Francisco Nayarit

=== Nicaragua ===
- San Francisco de Cuapa

=== Panama ===
- San Francisco, Veraguas

=== United States ===
- San Francisco, California. Also in the same area:
  - San Francisco Bay, the body of water that adjoins the city
  - The San Francisco Bay Area, the surrounding metropolitan region
  - St. Francis Wood, a neighborhood of San Francisco, California
  - Colleges and universities:
  - The University of San Francisco
  - The University of California, San Francisco
  - San Francisco State University
  - City College of San Francisco
  - The St. Francis Fountain, a restaurant
  - The St. Francis Hotel
  - Saint Francis Square Cooperative Apartments
- Saint Francis High School (La Cañada Flintridge, California) in Northeast Los Angeles county, California
- The San Francisco volcanic field is an area of volcanoes in Arizona, not associated with the city in California.
  - San Francisco Peaks, the mountain range in which the volcanoes are located
- The St. Francis River in Missouri and Arkansas, after which the following counties were named:
  - St. Francois County, Missouri
  - St. Francis County, Arkansas
- The St. Francis River in Minnesota. This name was originally given to what is now called the Rum River, for which the city of St. Francis, Minnesota was then named.
- San Francisco, New Mexico
- San Francisco, Puerto Rico
- San Francisco, Texas
- St. Francis, Arkansas
- St. Francisville, Illinois
- St. Francis, Kansas
- St. Francisville, Louisiana
- St. Francis, Wisconsin
- La Villa Real de la Santa Fé de San Francisco de Asís (the formal name of Santa Fe, New Mexico)
- Saint Francis University in Loretto, Pennsylvania
- The University of Saint Francis in Joliet, Illinois
- The University of Saint Francis in Fort Wayne, Indiana
- Saint Francis Episcopal Day School, Potomac, Maryland
- Saint Francis Episcopal Day School, Piney Point, Texas
- Saint Francis Healthcare, Wilmington, Delaware
- OSF Saint Francis Medical Center, Peoria, Illinois, the largest hospital of the OSF HealthCare system run by Franciscan sisters
- St. Francis Hospital, Milwaukee, Wisconsin
- Saint Francis Retreat Center, DeWitt, Michigan
- Saint Francis Medical Center, Trenton, New Jersey
- Saint Francis of Assisi Catholic Academy, Brooklyn, New York
- Saint Francis College, Brooklyn, New York
- Saint Francis Hospital, Poughkeepsie, New York
- Saint Francis Hospital, Tulsa, Oklahoma
- St. Francis of Assisi Catholic School, Burien, Washington
- St. Francis Rabbitry, Hampton, VA

=== Uruguay ===
- Playa San Francisco, Maldonado Department

== Asia ==
=== Hong Kong ===
- Saint Francis University (Hong Kong)

=== India ===
- St. Francis' College
- St Francis D'Assisi High school

=== Lebanon ===
- Mar Francis Secteur, Lebanon

=== Malaysia ===
- St. Francis' Institution
- SMK St. Francis Convent (M), Kota Kinabalu

=== Philippines ===
- St. Francis of Assisi College Las Pinas, Las Pinas
- St. Francis of Assisi College Bacoor, Bacoor, Cavite
- St. Francis of Assisi College Muntinlupa, Muntinlupa
- San Francisco, Agusan del Sur
- San Francisco, Cebu
- San Francisco, Quezon
- San Francisco, Southern Leyte
- San Francisco, Surigao del Norte

== Europe ==
=== France ===
- Saint-François (Thionville)

=== Italy ===
- Piazza San Francesco (St. Francis square), Pistoia
- Basilica of Saint Francis of Assisi

=== Poland ===
- St. Francis of Assisi Church, Malnia

=== United Kingdom ===
- St. Francis of Assisi, Halstead

== See also ==
- St. Francis (disambiguation)
- Saint-François (disambiguation)
