= San Francisco (disambiguation) =

San Francisco is a consolidated city and county in the U.S. state of California.

San Francisco may also refer to:

== Places within San Francisco, California ==
- San Francisco Bay
- San Francisco Bay Area, the metropolitan area
- San Francisco Peninsula, the peninsula where the city is located
- University of San Francisco, a Jesuit university in the city
- San Francisco State University, a public university part of the CSU System
- Mission San Francisco de Asís, a Spanish mission and the first European settlement in the city

== Other places ==
=== Argentina ===
- San Francisco, Córdoba

=== Chile ===
- San Francisco Glacier
- San Francisco de Mostazal

=== Colombia ===
- San Francisco, Antioquia
- San Francisco, Cundinamarca
- San Francisco, La Guajira
- San Francisco, Putumayo

=== Costa Rica ===
- San Francisco de Dos Ríos District, San José Canton

=== Dominican Republic ===
- San Francisco de Macorís

=== Ecuador ===
- San Francisco de Quito, formal name of the capital city

=== Honduras ===
- San Francisco, Atlántida
- San Francisco, Lempira
- San Francisco de Opalaca, Intibucá
- San Francisco de Yojoa, Cortes

=== Guatemala ===
- San Francisco, El Petén
- San Francisco El Alto, Totonicapán
- San Francisco Zapotitlán, Suchitepéquez

=== Mexico ===
- San Francisco de Campeche
- San Francisco de Conchos, Chihuahua
- San Francisco de los Romo, Aguascalientes
- San Francisco del Mezquital, Durango
- San Francisco Coacalco, State of Mexico
- San Francisco Cahuacúa, Oaxaca
- San Francisco Cajonos, Oaxaca
- San Francisco Chapulapa, Oaxaca
- San Francisco Chindúa, Oaxaca
- San Francisco del Mar, Oaxaca
- San Francisco Huehuetlán, Oaxaca
- San Francisco Ixhuatán, Oaxaca
- San Francisco Jaltepetongo, Oaxaca
- San Francisco Lachigoló, Oaxaca
- San Francisco Logueche, Oaxaca
- San Francisco Nuxaño, Oaxaca
- San Francisco Ozolotepec, Oaxaca
- San Francisco Sola, Oaxaca
- San Francisco Telixtlahuaca, Oaxaca
- San Francisco Teopan, Oaxaca
- San Francisco Tlapancingo, Oaxaca
- San Francisco, Nayarit
- San Francisco Tetlanohcan, Tlaxcala

=== Nicaragua ===
- San Francisco de Cuapa

=== Panama ===
- San Francisco, Panamá
- San Francisco, Veraguas

=== Philippines ===
- San Francisco, Agusan del Sur
- San Francisco, Cebu
- San Francisco, Quezon
- San Francisco, Southern Leyte
- San Francisco, Surigao del Norte
- San Francisco, San Pablo, Laguna
- San Francisco, Bohol

=== Spain ===
- San Francisco (Bilbao)
- Sant Francesc Xavier, Formentera, Balearic Islands

=== United States ===
- San Francisco, Old San Juan, a sector within the township of Old San Juan in the capital of San Juan, Puerto Rico
- San Francisco, Minnesota, an abandoned town
- Mission San Francisco de Potano, a Spanish mission to the Timucua Indians of Florida
- Mission San Francisco Solano (California), a Spanish mission in Sonoma, California
- San Francisco Peaks, a set of mountains in Arizona
- San Francisco volcanic field, Arizona; includes above peaks
- San Francisco Plantation House, a historic plantation near New Orleans
- La Villa Real de la Santa Fé de San Francisco de Asís (the original Spanish name of Santa Fe, New Mexico)
- San Francisco, Colorado, a small town at the foot of the Sangre de Cristo Mountains

=== Venezuela ===
- San Francisco de Yare, Miranda
- San Francisco de Yuruaní, Bolivar

== Arts and media ==
- San Francisco (magazine), a monthly publication dedicated to arts and culture in the San Francisco Bay Area
- Driver: San Francisco, a video game
- San Francisco convention, a contract bridge bidding convention

=== Film ===
- San Francisco (1936 film), a 1936 film set in the city, about the events surrounding the 1906 San Francisco earthquake
- San Francisco (1968 film), a 1968 pioneering impressionistic documentary film directed by Anthony Stern

=== Music ===
==== Albums ====
- San Francisco (American Music Club album), 1994
- San Francisco (Bobby Hutcherson album), 1971
- San Francisco (Fleurine album), 2008

==== Songs ====
- "San Francisco" (Cascada song), 2011
- "San Francisco (Be Sure to Wear Flowers in Your Hair)", written by John Phillips and sung by Scott McKenzie, 1967
- "San Francisco (You've Got Me)", by the Village People, 1977
- "Theme from San Francisco", from the 1936 film, later popularized by Judy Garland
- "San Francisco", by 5 Seconds of Summer from Sounds Good Feels Good, 2015
- "San Francisco", by 808 State from ex:el, 1991
- "San Francisco", by Jill Sobule from California Years, 2009
- "San Francisco", by Maxime Le Forestier, 1973
- "San Francisco", by Midicronica, featured in the series Samurai Champloo, 2005
- "San Francisco", by the Mowgli's, 2012
- "San Francisco", by Niall Horan from Heartbreak Weather, 2020
- "San Francisco", by Tor Endresen, representing Norway at Eurovision 1997

== Sports ==
- San Francisco 49ers, a professional American football club in Santa Clara, California, which retains the name San Francisco, having played in the city from 1946 to 2013
- San Francisco City FC, an American amateur soccer club in San Francisco, California
- San Francisco Dons, the nickname of the athletic teams at the University of San Francisco
- San Francisco F.C., a Panamanian football club in La Chorrera, Panamá
- San Francisco Giants, a professional baseball club in San Francisco, California
- San Francisco Park, a short-lived Cuban professional baseball team in Havana from 1915–1916
- San Francisco (baseball), a Cuban professional baseball team in Havana who played from 1899–1907

== Transportation ==
- The City of San Francisco (train), a passenger train
- The San Francisco Chief, a passenger train
- USS San Francisco, the name of several vessels of the US Navy
- San Francisco station (disambiguation)

== Other uses ==
- San Francisco (decorative typeface), an Apple font for Macintosh computers up to Mac OS 7
- San Francisco (sans-serif typeface), another font by Apple for its devices and as its corporate typeface
- San Francisco (cell phone), the Orange UK model of the ZTE Blade smartphone
- San Francisco System, a bilateral alliance network pursued by the US in East Asia, after the end of the World War II

== See also ==
- San Francisco Cathedral (disambiguation)
- San Francisco Declaration
- San Francisco attack (disambiguation)
- St. Francis (disambiguation), the English equivalent of San Francisco
- São Francisco (disambiguation), the Portuguese equivalent of San Francisco
- List of places named after Saint Francis
- San Cisco, an Australian musical group
- "San Frandisco", a 2020 song by Dom Dolla
