= Saint-François =

Saint-François is the French form of Saint Francis, and is the name of many locations:

== Canada ==
- Saint-François River, a river in Quebec
- Saint-François Parish, New Brunswick, a parish in Madawaska County, New Brunswick
- Saint-François, Quebec (disambiguation), multiple uses
- Saint-François (electoral district), a provincial electoral district in Quebec
- Saint-François-d'Assise, Quebec, a community in the Regional County Municipality of Avignon in Quebec
- Saint-François-de-Madawaska, New Brunswick, a former village in New Brunswick, now part of Haut-Madawaska
- Saint-François-de-l'Île-d'Orléans, a town on the Île d'Orléans in Quebec
- Saint-François-de-la-Rivière-du-Sud, Quebec, a municipality in the Montmagny Regional County Municipality, Quebec
- Saint-François-de-Sales, Quebec, a municipality in the Le Domaine-du-Roy Regional County Municipality, Quebec
- Saint-François-du-Lac, Quebec, a community in the Nicolet-Yamaska Regional County Municipality of Quebec
- St. François Xavier, Manitoba, a community part of the electoral district of Morris in Manitoba
- Saint-François-Xavier-de-Brompton, Quebec, parish municipality in Le Val-Saint-François Regional County Municipality, Quebec
- Saint-François-Xavier-de-Viger, Quebec, municipality in Rivière-du-Loup Regional County Municipality, Quebec
- Lac Saint-François, a lake on the Saint Lawrence River between Lake Ontario and Montreal
- Le Val-Saint-François Regional County Municipality, Quebec, a regional county municipality of Quebec
- Le Haut-Saint-François Regional County Municipality, Quebec, a regional county municipality in southeastern Quebec
- Petite-Rivière-Saint-François, a community in the Charlevoix Regional County Municipality, Quebec

== France ==
- Saint François Xavier (Paris Metro), a subway station in Paris
- Saint-François (Thionville), a neighborhood in Thionville

== Guadeloupe ==
- Saint-François, Guadeloupe

== Seychelles ==
- St. François Atoll and St. François Island

== United States ==
- Saint Francois County, Missouri, a county located in Missouri
- Saint Francois Mountains, a range of mountains located in Missouri
- St. Francois Township (disambiguation), several places

== Miscellanea ==
- Saint François d'Assise, 1983 opera by Olivier Messiaen

== See also ==
- François
- Saint Francis
