= Saint Francis Academy =

Saint Francis Academy may refer to:

- Saint Francis Academy (Gainesville, Florida), a secondary school in the U.S.
- St. Francis Academy, a former U.S. all-girls secondary school that merged into Joliet Catholic Academy
- St. Francis Academy (San Antonio), a former all-girls secondary school in Texas, U.S.

== See also ==
- Franciscan Montessori Earth School & Saint Francis Academy, an elementary and middle school in Oregon, U.S.
- Saint Frances Academy (Baltimore), a co-ed secondary school in the U.S.
- University of Saint Francis (disambiguation)
