= Saint-François, Quebec =

Saint-François, Quebec may refer to:

- Saint-François, Laval, Quebec, a district of Laval, Quebec that was an independent city before 1965
- Saint-François-de-l'Île-d'Orléans, known simply as Saint-François until December 2003
- Saint-François-de-Beauce, Quebec, now part of Beauceville, Quebec
- Saint-François-du-Lac, Quebec
- Saint-François-de-Sales, Quebec in Saguenay–Lac-Saint-Jean region
  (confusingly, some of the other Saint-François were also known historically as Saint-François-de-Sales parishes)
- Saint-François-de-la-Rivière-du-Sud, Quebec
- Saint-François-d'Assise, Quebec
- Saint-François-Xavier-de-Brompton, Quebec
- Saint-François-Xavier-de-Viger, Quebec
