= San Francisco, Socorro County, New Mexico =

New Mexico hamlet

Coordinates: 34°23′45″N 106°50′21″W

San Francisco

San Francisco is a hamlet in Socorro County in the U.S. state of New Mexico. It is located where the Rio Grande is supplied by its tributary the Rio Puerco; the opposite bank of the Rio Grande is occupied by Contreras, formerly Los Ranchos de La Joya. It is unknown when San Francisco was founded, but it was recorded by the Wheeler Survey and several of the decadal censuses in the late nineteenth and early twentieth centuries. It is among many places in New Mexico named for Francis of Assisi.
