= São Francisco de Assis =

São Francisco de Assis, Portuguese for Saint Francis of Assisi, may refer to:

- São Francisco de Assis, Rio Grande do Sul, municipality in the State of Rio Grande do Sul, Brazil
- São Francisco de Assis do Piauí, municipality in the State of Piauí, Brazil

== See also ==
- São Francisco (disambiguation)
- Church of Saint Francis of Assisi, Pampulha
