= Francisco Costa =

Francisco Costa may refer to:

- Francisco Costa (designer) (born 1964), Brazilian designer
- Francisco Costa (tennis) (born 1973), Brazilian tennis player
- Francisco Costa (handballer) (born 2005), Portuguese handball player
- Francisco Costa (Brazilian politician) (born 1979), Brazilian politician
- Francisco José Fernandes Costa (1867–1925), Portuguese lawyer and politician
