= Fazenda Jatobá Quilombola Territory =

Quilombo remnant community in Brazil

Fazenda Jatobá is a quilombo remnant community, a traditional Brazilian population, located in the Brazilian municipality of Muquém do São Francisco, in Bahia. The Fazenda Jatobá community consists of a population of 69 families, distributed across an area of 12,717.262 hectares . The territory was certified as a quilombo remnant (historical remnants of former quilombos) in 2004 by the Palmares Cultural Foundation.

This community had its Technical Identification and Delimitation Report published in 2006 (a stage of land regularization), and received the land title on 21/05/2007 from INCRA.

== Listing ==
The listing of quilombos as protected heritage sites is provided for by the Brazilian Constitution of 1988, requiring only certification by the Palmares Cultural Foundation:

Article 216. The following constitute Brazilian cultural heritage: tangible and intangible assets, considered individually or collectively, that are bearers of reference to the identity, actions, and memory of the different groups that formed Brazilian society [...] § 5. All documents and sites containing historical reminiscences of the former quilombos are hereby declared protected.

Therefore, the quilombola community of Fazenda Jatobá is a Brazilian cultural heritage, given that it received certification as a "historical reminiscence of an old quilombo" from the Palmares Cultural Foundation in 2004.

== Territorial situation ==
Land title (land regularization) allows the community to face fewer difficulties in developing agriculture (such as conflicts over land ownership with farmers in the region where it is located).

Traditional Peoples or Traditional Communities are groups that have a culture distinct from the predominant local culture, maintaining a way of life closely linked to the natural environment in which they live. Through their own forms of social organization, use of territory and natural resources (with a subsistence relationship ), their socio-cultural-religious reproduction utilizes knowledge transmitted orally and in daily practice.
