= Christ Taking Leave of his Mother (El Greco) =

Painting by El Greco

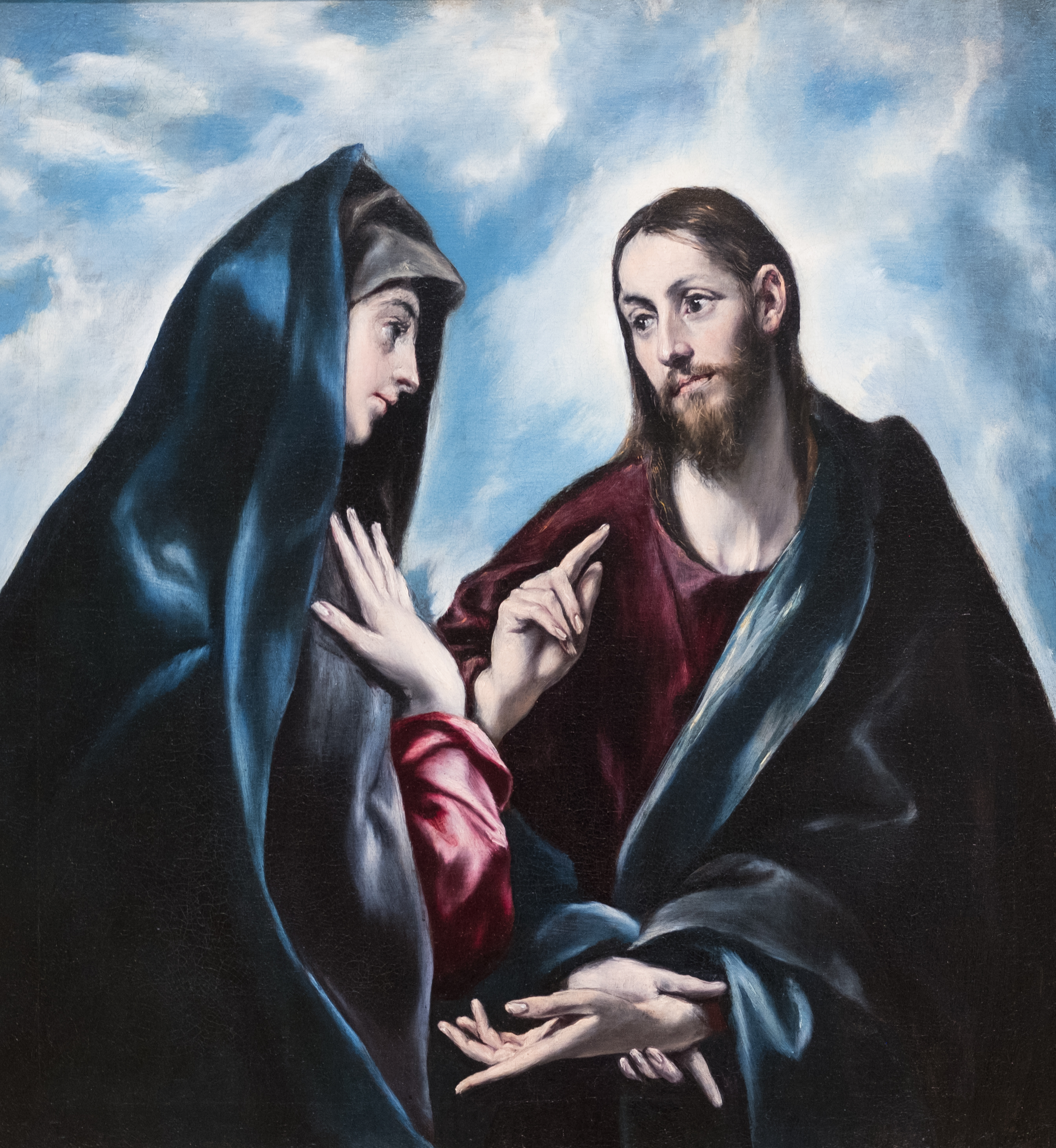
- Artist: El Greco
- Year: 1595
- Medium: Oil on canvas
- Dimensions: 109 cm × 99 cm (43 in × 39 in)

Christ Taking Leave of his Mother is a 1595 oil on canvas painting by a Greek artist Theotokopoulos Domenikos, better known as El Greco. The painting represents the first depiction of the subject by the artist.

Christ taking leave of his Mother was a subject more often found in Northern Renaissance art, and earlier in the century.

== Description ==
Christ says farewell to his mother Mary, often blessing her, before leaving for his final journey to Jerusalem, which he knows will lead to his Passion and death; indeed this scene marks the beginning of his Passion. On Christ Taking Leave of his Mother, son's and mother's left and right hands are intertwined, and the fingers of their other hands are pointing in different directions. The faces of Jesus and Mary express pure love and acceptance between two people. The figures show certain dependence on Michelangelo, especially El Greco's elongation of the hands. The painting displays the formative influence of El Greco's time in Venice.

Christ Taking Leave of his Mother is sometimes considered rather incomplete in comparison to more superior works by El Greco, such as Saint Francis and Brother Leo in Meditation.

== See also ==
- List of works by El Greco
