= St. Francis =

St. Francis or Saint Francis may refer to:

== Roman Catholic saints ==
- Francis of Assisi (1181–1226), Italian founder of the Order of Friars Minor (Franciscans)
- Francis of Paola (1416–1507), Italian (Calabrian) founder of the Order of the Minims
- Francis Xavier (1506–1552), Navarrese Catholic missionary to India; co-founder of the Society of Jesus (Jesuits)
- Francis Borgia (1510–1572), Spanish Jesuit priest; third leader of the Jesuits
- Francis Solanus (1549–1610), Spanish Franciscan missionary to South America
- Francis Caracciolo (1563–1608), Italian priest who co-founded the Congregation of the Minor Clerics Regular
- Francis de Sales (1567–1622), French born bishop of Geneva, Switzerland
- Francis Ferdinand de Capillas (1607–1648), Castilian Dominican missionary; first Roman Catholic martyr killed in China
- Francis de Geronimo (1642–1716), Italian Jesuit priest
- Francis Marto (1908–1919), Portuguese Marian child visionary

== Artworks ==
- Saint Francis (Gonçalves)
- Saint Francis (Strozzi)
- Saint Francis (Zurbarán, Lyon)

== Places ==
=== Australia ===
- St Francis Island, an island in South Australia

=== Canada ===
- St. Francis, Alberta
- Saint-François Parish, New Brunswick, formerly named St. Francis Parish
- Saint-François-de-Madawaska, New Brunswick, formerly named St. Francis
- St. Francis Harbour, Nova Scotia

=== South Africa ===
- St Francis Bay, a village in Cacadu District Municipality, Eastern Cape province
- Cape St. Francis, a town in Eastern Cape province

=== United States ===
- St. Francis, Arkansas
- St. Francis, Florida, a ghost town in Florida
- St. Francis, Kansas
- Saint Francis, Kentucky
- St. Francis, Maine
- St. Francis, Minnesota, Anoka County
- St. Francis, Stearns County, Minnesota
- St. Francis, South Dakota, a town on the Rosebud Indian Reservation in Todd County
- St. Francis, Texas
- St. Francis, Wisconsin
- St. Francis River, a river in Missouri and Arkansas

== Schools ==
- St. Francis College, a college in Brooklyn Heights, New York
  - St. Francis Brooklyn Terriers, the school's athletic program
- St. Francis' College, a college in Lucknow, India
- Saint Francis University (Pennsylvania), a university in Loretto, Pennsylvania
  - Saint Francis Red Flash, the school's athletic program
- Saint Francis University (Hong Kong), a university in Hong Kong formerly known as Caritas Institute of Higher Education
- St. Francis Xavier University, a university in Antigonish, Nova Scotia, Canada
- University of St. Francis, a university with locations throughout the United States
- University of Saint Francis (disambiguation), various universities
- Saint Francis High School (disambiguation), various high schools
- St. Francis Xavier High School (disambiguation), various high schools
- St. Francis' Canossian College, a secondary school in Hong Kong
- St. Francis' Canossian School, a primary school in Hong Kong
- List of schools named after Francis Xavier

== Other uses ==
- St. Francis (film), a 2002 film starring Raoul Bove
- HMCS St. Francis, a Royal Canadian Navy destroyer during World War II
- St. Francis (fireboat), operated by the San Francisco Fire Department
- St. Francis Yacht Club, a sailing club in San Francisco since 2016
- St Francis F.C., a football club in Ireland
- Nobilissima Visione, a 1938 ballet by Paul Hindemith, known at its New York performance as Saint Francis
- Convent of Saint Francis (Vitoria-Gasteiz), a former convent in Basque Country, Spain
- Feast of Saint Francis, a religious and civil celebration annually held in Italy and other locations
- OSF Saint Francis Medical Center, a level I trauma center and teaching hospital in Peoria, Illinois
- St. Francis Dam, a dam in California that collapsed in 1928

== See also ==
- St. Frances (disambiguation)
- List of places named after Saint Francis
- San Francisco, a city and county in California
- St. Francis Hospital (disambiguation)
- Saint Francis in Ecstasy (disambiguation)
- Saint-François (disambiguation)
- Francis (disambiguation)
- San Francisco (disambiguation)
- San Francisco Cathedral (disambiguation)
- São Francisco (disambiguation)
