= San Francisco Cathedral =

San Francisco Cathedral may refer to:

- San Francisco de Asis Cathedral Basilica (Santa Fe), New Mexico, United States
- San Francisco de Asis Cathedral (Laayoune), Western Sahara
- San Francisco Javier Cathedral (Kabankalan), Negros Occidental, Philippines

== See also ==
- San Francisco (disambiguation)
- Church of San Francisco (disambiguation)
- Saint Francis (disambiguation)
