= St. Francis of Assisi Church, Malnia =

Coordinates: 50.3055°N 17.5746°E

St. Francis of Assisi Church
- Kościół św. Franciszka z Asyżu w Malni
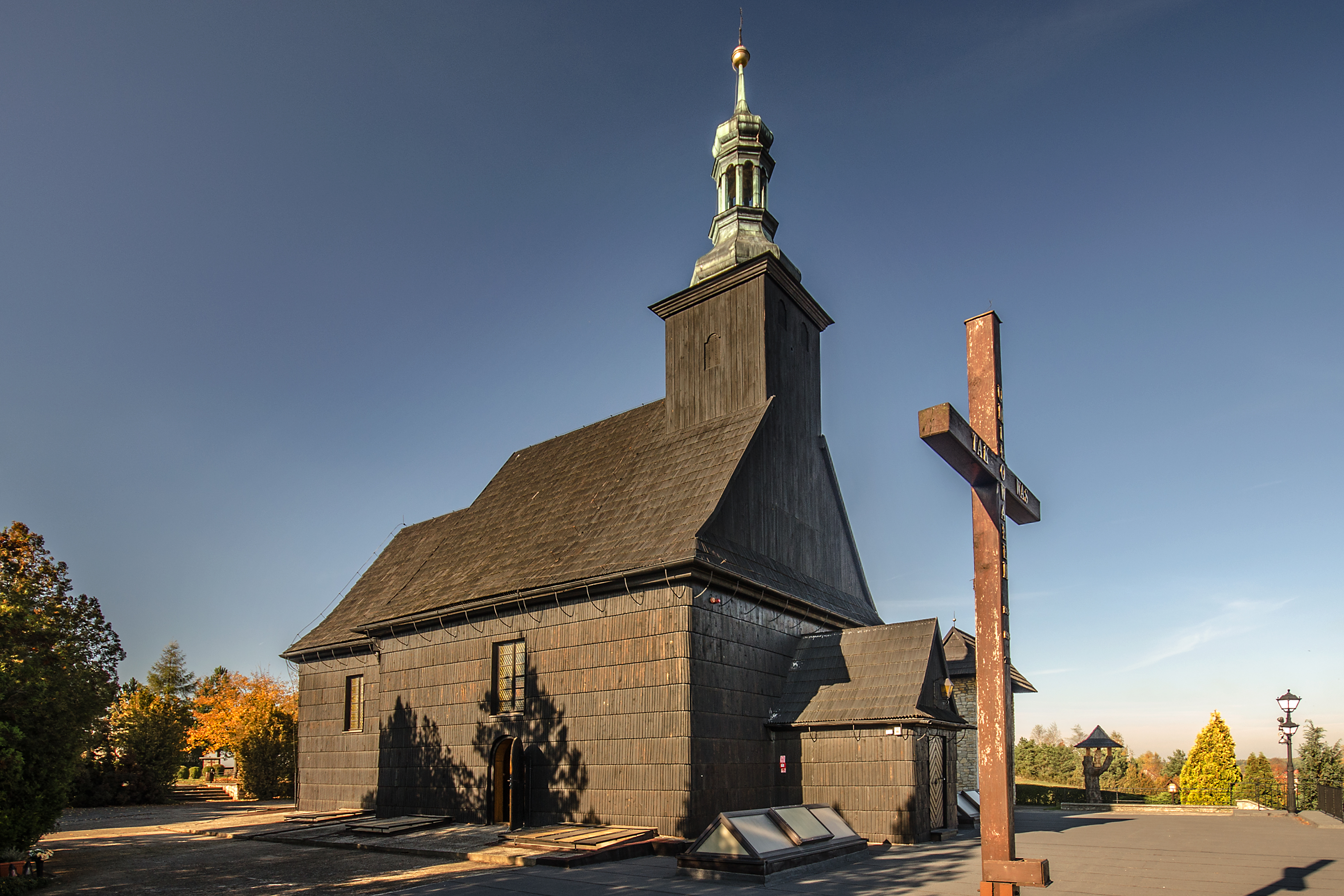
- St. Francis of Assisi Church
- St. Francis of Assisi Church
- Location: Malnia
- Country: Poland
- Denomination: Roman Catholic

History
- Founder: Antoni von Strachwitz

Architecture
- Groundbreaking: 1801
- Completed: 1804

Specifications
- Materials: Wood

Administration
- Diocese: Roman Catholic Diocese of Opole
- Parish: Parafia Podwyższenia Krzyża Świętego

St. Francis of Assisi Church is a historic, wooden chapel of ease in Malnia, Krapkowice County in Poland.

The shrine was built between 1801 and 1804, funded by Antoni von Strachwitz, formerly having served as an Evangelical in the village of Kostów near Kluczbork. The church was renovated in 1943. The church was moved to Malnia in 1977.
