= St. Frances =

St. Frances or Saint Frances may refer to:

- Frances of Rome (1384–1440), Italian Catholic saint and founder of the Olivetan Oblates of Mary
- Frances Xavier Cabrini (1850-1917), Italian-American Catholic saint and founder of the Missionary Sisters of the Sacred Heart of Jesus
- Saint Frances (film), a 2020 film starring Kelly O'Sullivan, Ramona Edith Williams, and Max Lipchitz.

== See also ==
- St. Francis (disambiguation)
