= Swoon of the Virgin =

Idea that the Virgin Mary had fainted during the Passion of Christ

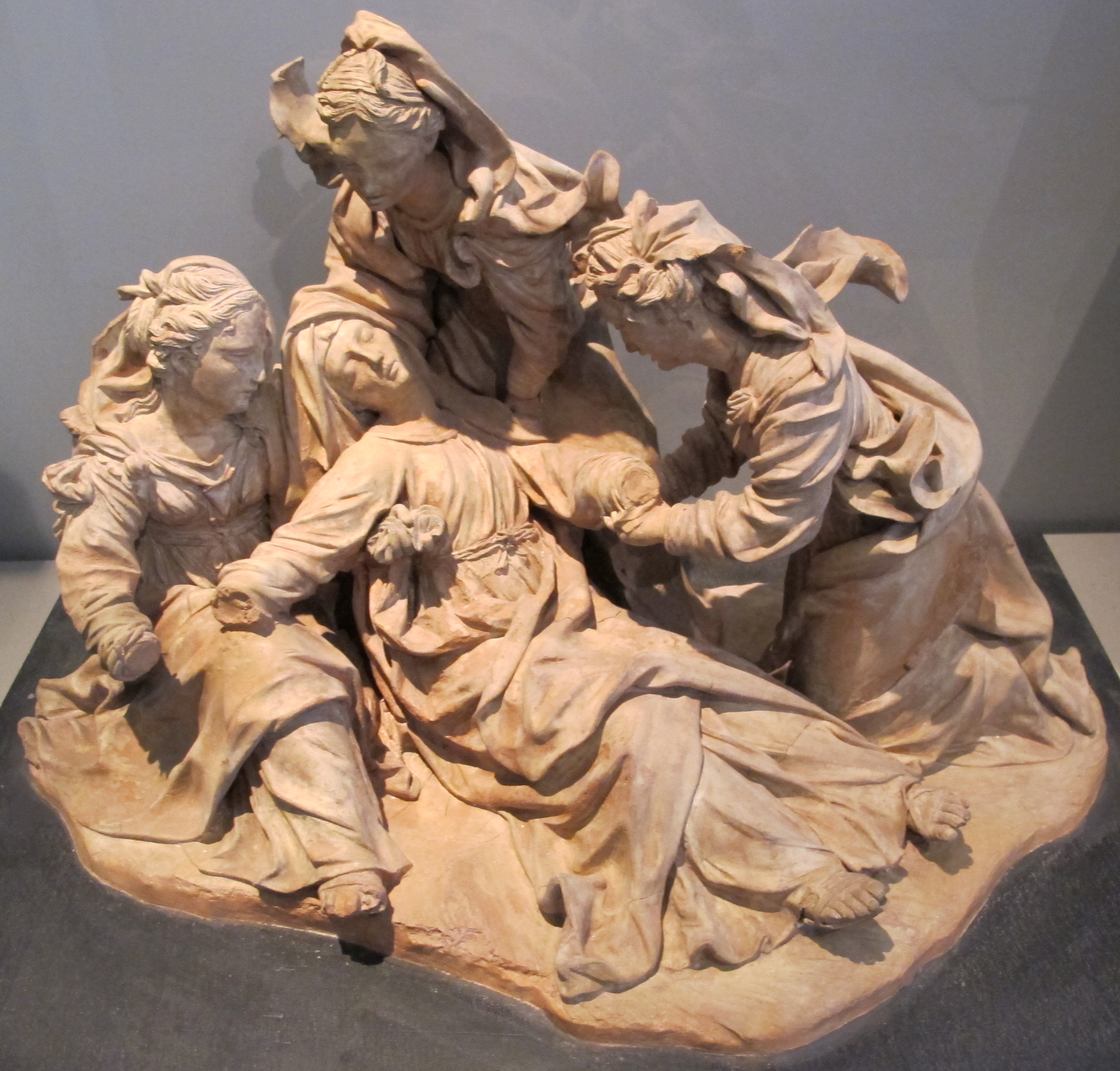
Terracotta modello, Antonio Begarelli, c. 1530

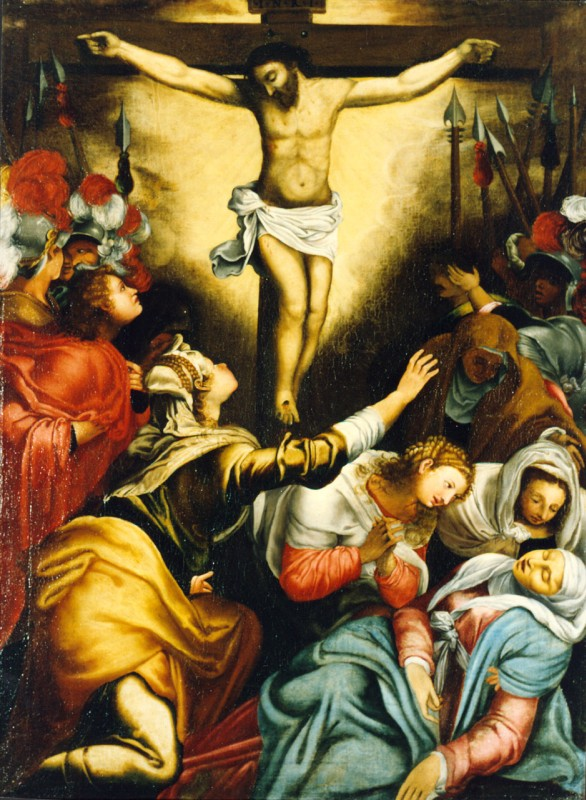
The Virgin fainting at the Crucifixion, copy of Taddeo Zuccari

The Descent from the Cross c. 1435, by Rogier van der Weyden. Museo del Prado

The Swoon of the Virgin, in Italian Lo Spasimo della Vergine, or Fainting Virgin Mary was an idea developed in the late Middle Ages, that the Virgin Mary had fainted during the Passion of Christ, most often placed while she watched the Crucifixion of Jesus. It was based on mentions in later texts of the apocryphal Gospel of Nicodemus (Acta Pilati), which describe Mary swooning. It was popular in later medieval art and theological literature, but as it was not mentioned in the Canonical Gospels, it became controversial - Protestants rejecting it outright, and from the 16th century discouraged also by many senior Catholic churchmen.

The swoon might be placed during the episode of Christ Carrying the Cross, as on the Via Dolorosa in Jerusalem, but very commonly also during the Crucifixion of Jesus; Nicholas Penny estimates that "about half of the surviving paintings of the Crucifixion made between 1300 and 1500 will be found to include the Virgin fainting". It also appeared in works showing the Deposition from the Cross and Entombment of Christ, as well as the 15th-century novelty of Christ taking leave of his Mother.

== History ==
A fainting Mary is sometimes shown in art as early as the 12th century, and becomes common by the middle of the 13th century. For example there is one in the Crucifixion relief on the pulpit in the Pisa Baptistery of 1260, by Nicola Pisano. By 1308 the pilgrimage route of the Via Dolorosa in Jerusalem included a church formally dedicated to Saint John the Baptist but known as the site of the Virgin's swoon; by 1350 guidebooks mention a church of Santa Maria de Spasimo, which was later replaced by housing. The very popular book Meditations on the Life of Christ, of about 1300, mentions three points in the Passion where Mary faints or collapses. By the 15th century Italian sacri monti included shrines commemorating the spasimo in their routes, and an unofficial feast-day was being celebrated by many, especially the Franciscans, and the Vatican was being asked to make it official.

However no such incident was mentioned in the Four Gospels, and it was disapproved of by many theologians. The backlash produced a work of 1506 by the Dominican Thomas Cajetan, then a professor at the Sapienza University of Rome and later to be head of his order and, as a Cardinal, Martin Luther's opponent in dialogue. Cajetan pointed out the lack of biblical authority and, as described by Nicholas Penny, that "the severe physical weakness following a 'spasimo' as defined by Avicenna would be incompatible with the explicit statement in the Gospel of Saint John that the Virgin stood beside the cross, an act of endurance that would have required exceptional strength. Furthermore, even a less serious faint or 'spasimo' would have been incompatible with the Grace that enabled the Virgin to suffer with her full mind".

Official disapproval of the swoon gained ground in the Counter-Reformation and was followed by the authors of guides for the clergy on the interpretation of the short and inexplicit decrees of the Council of Trent in 1563 on sacred images, with minutely detailed instructions for artists and commissioners of works. The guides of Molanus (1570), Cardinal Gabriele Paleotti (1582) and Cardinal Federigo Borromeo objected to the depiction, and it was criticised by authors of theological works on the Virgin such as Peter Canisius (1577). At least in Rome there appears to have been actual censorship, with paintings removed from public view and permission refused for the publication of an engraving by Cornelius Bloemaert of a Crucifixion by Annibale Carraci, which had to be published in Paris instead.

However, no more official condemnation of the belief in the incident came, and although new depictions were fewer, existing ones remained in place, including many in Dominican churches. Indeed, where the swooning Virgin was depicted, she was often even more prominent. Depictions placed other than at the Crucifixion itself avoided many of the theological objections.

The examples illustrated show more complete fainting, but in many images the Virgin remains standing, supported by St John, the Three Marys, or other disciples. Many images are ambiguous, presumably deliberately, and can be read as the Virgin either feeling faint, or simply stricken with grief. One major work to depict the Swoon is The Descent from the Cross by Rogier van der Weyden (Prado, c. 1435), in which the body of the Virgin, with eyes closed, is parallel to that of her son just above.

== Churches ==
A number of churches take the name of the Swoon, including:

- Santa Maria dello Spasimo, Palermo, Sicily
- Santa Maria dello Spasimo, Modugno, Bari
- Beata Vergine dello Spasimo, Cerea, Province of Verona
- Madonna dello Spasimo, Bergamo

== Gallery ==
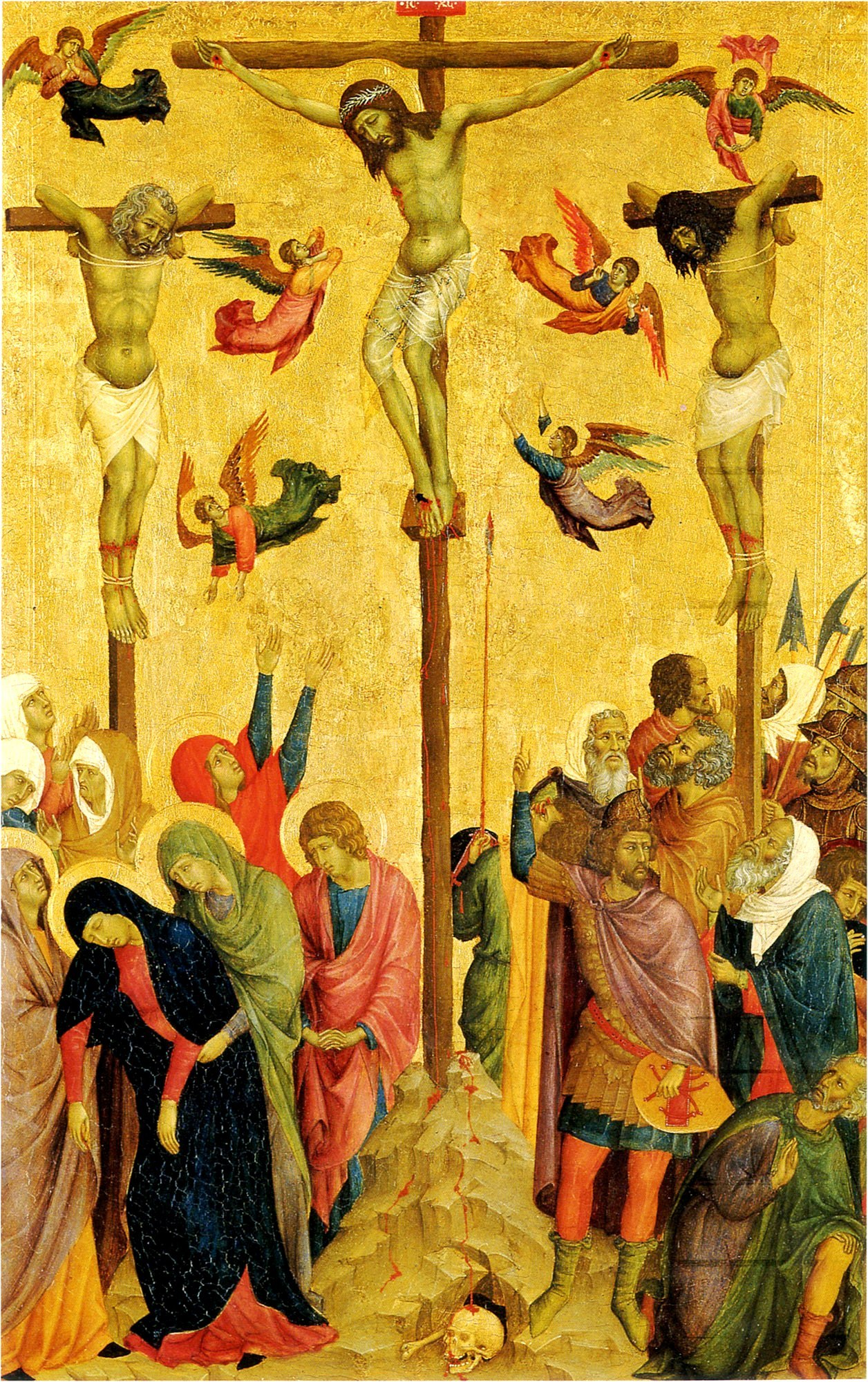
Italian, c. 1320

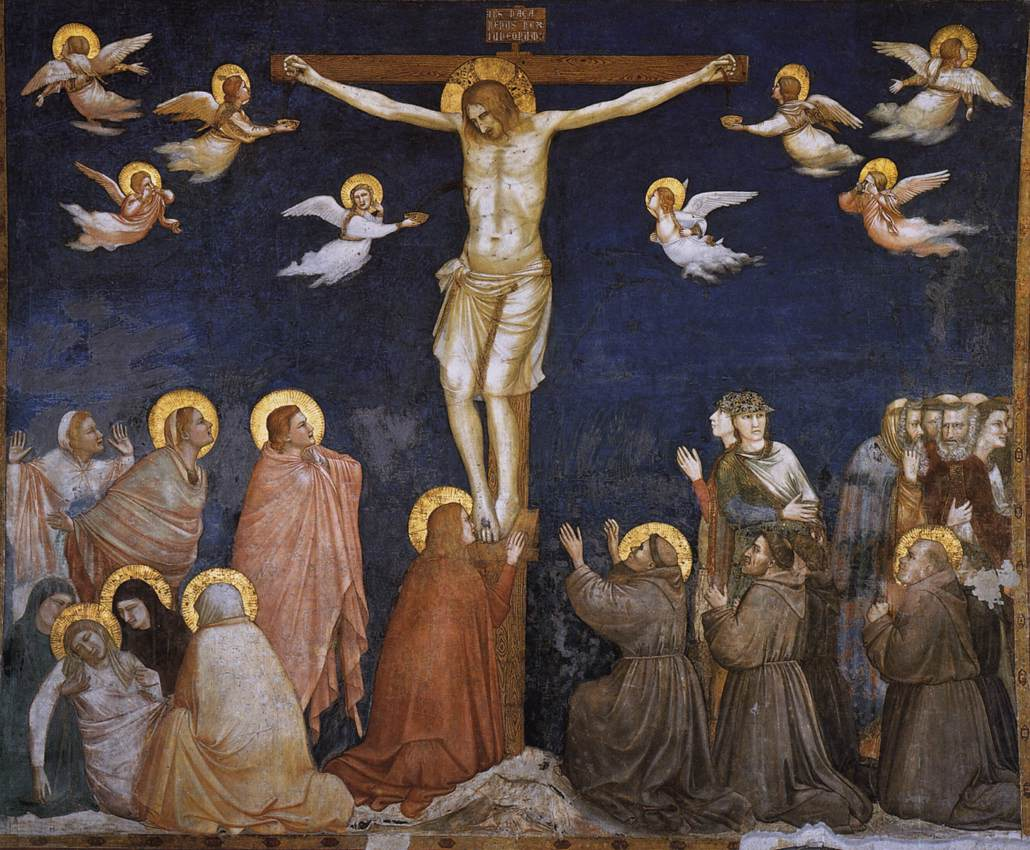
Lower Church, Basilica of San Francesco d'Assisi, Assisi

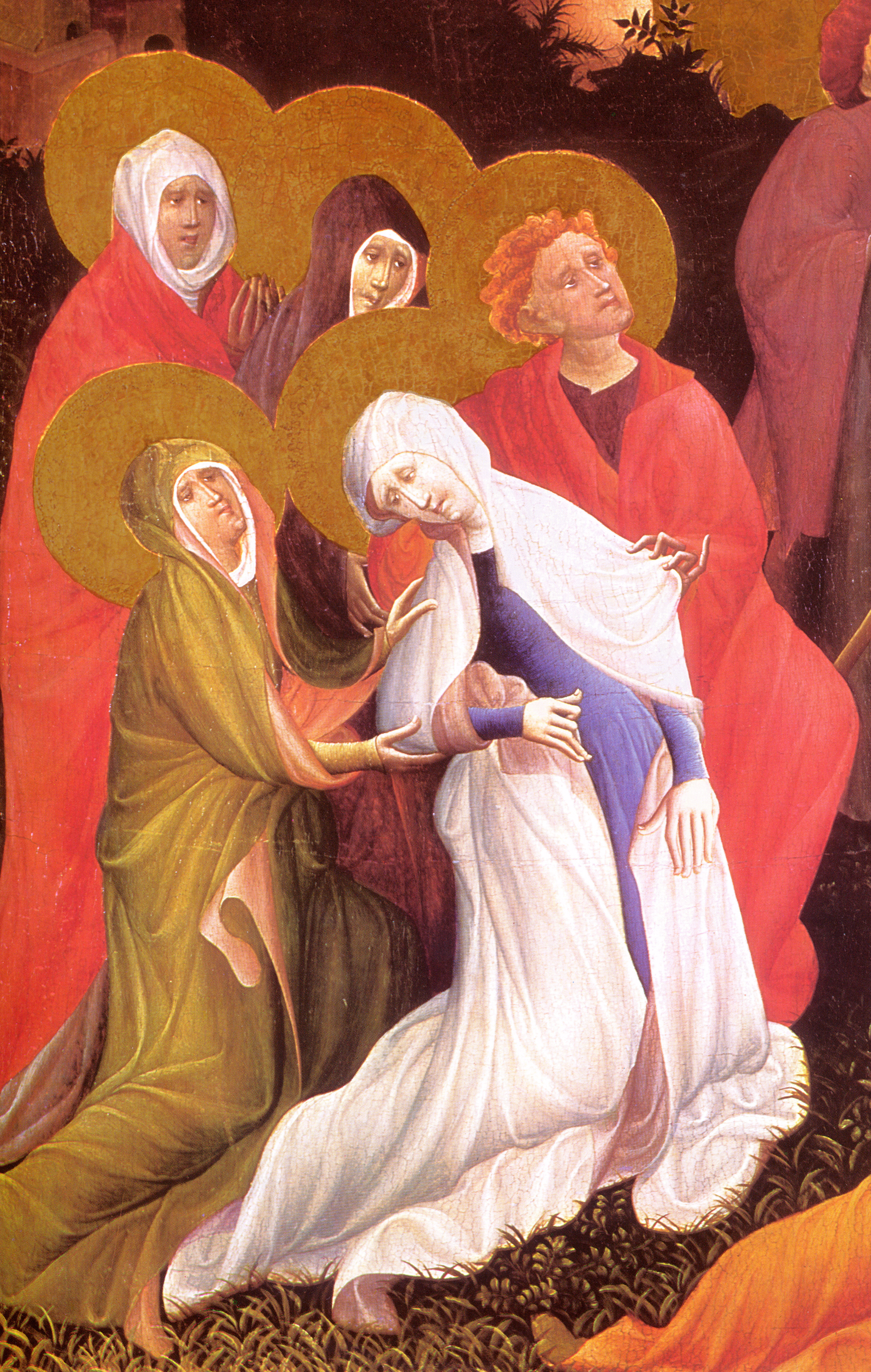
Marienkirche, detail from the Berswordt-Altar

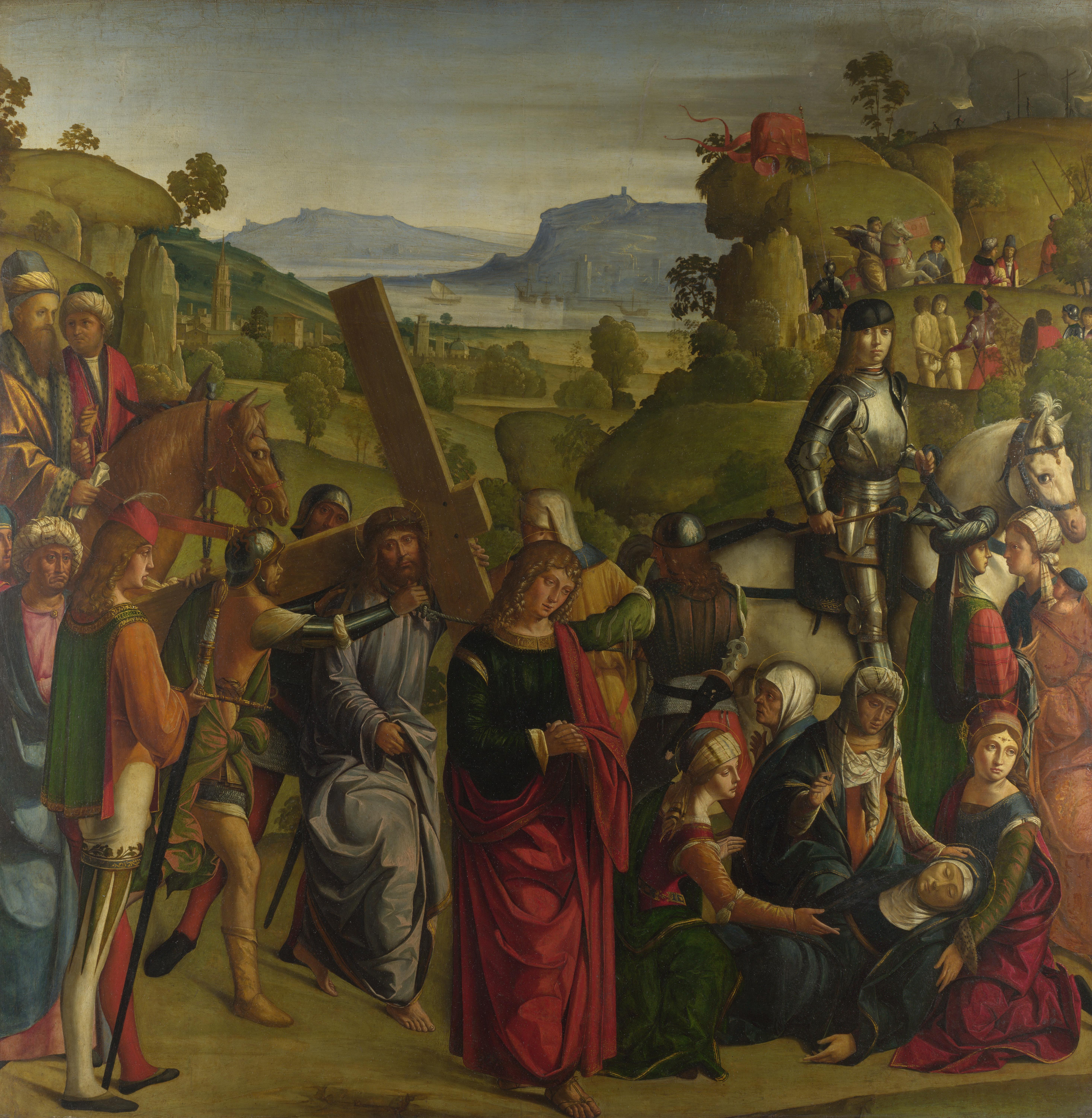
Boccaccio Boccaccino, Christ Carrying the Cross (National Gallery, London)

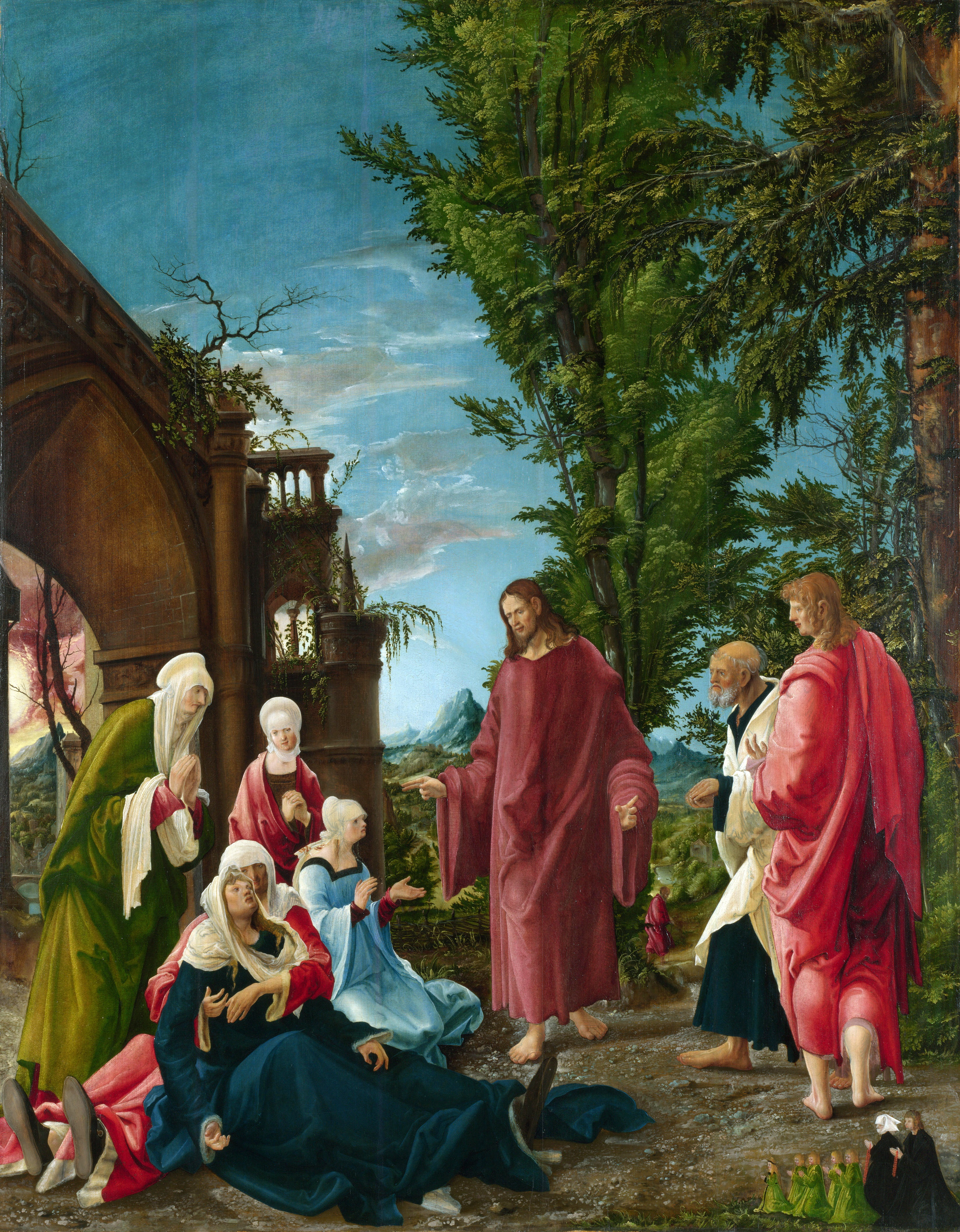
Christ taking Leave of his Mother, Albrecht Altdorfer c. 1520

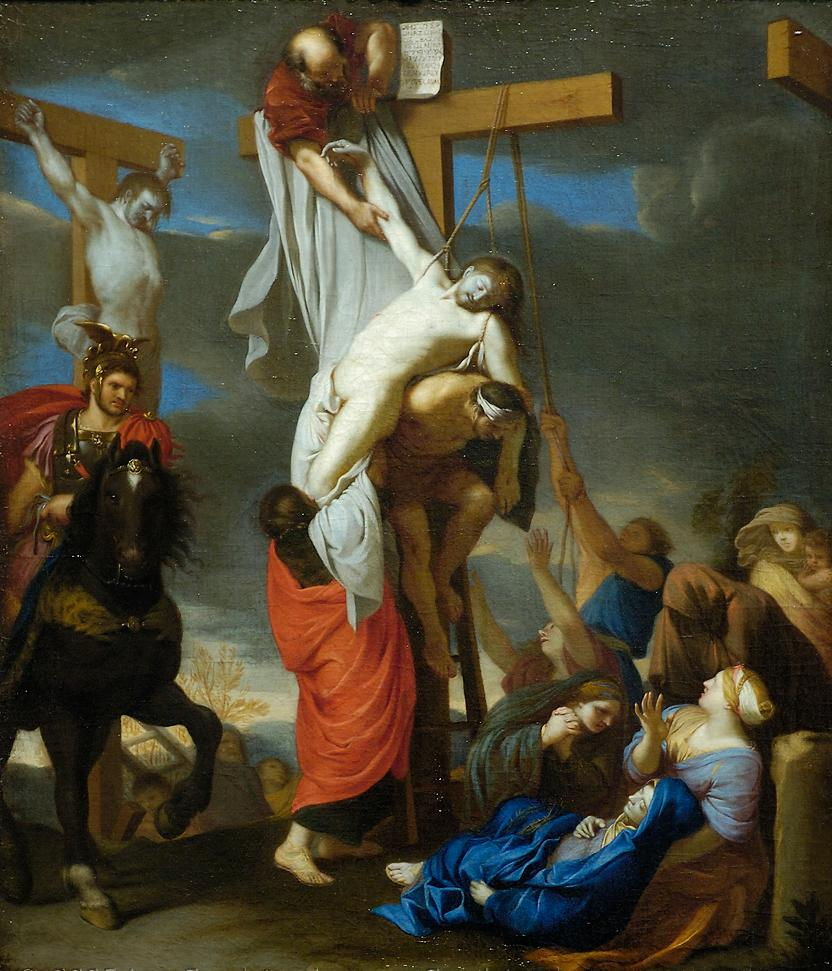
Charles Le Brun, Descent from the Cross

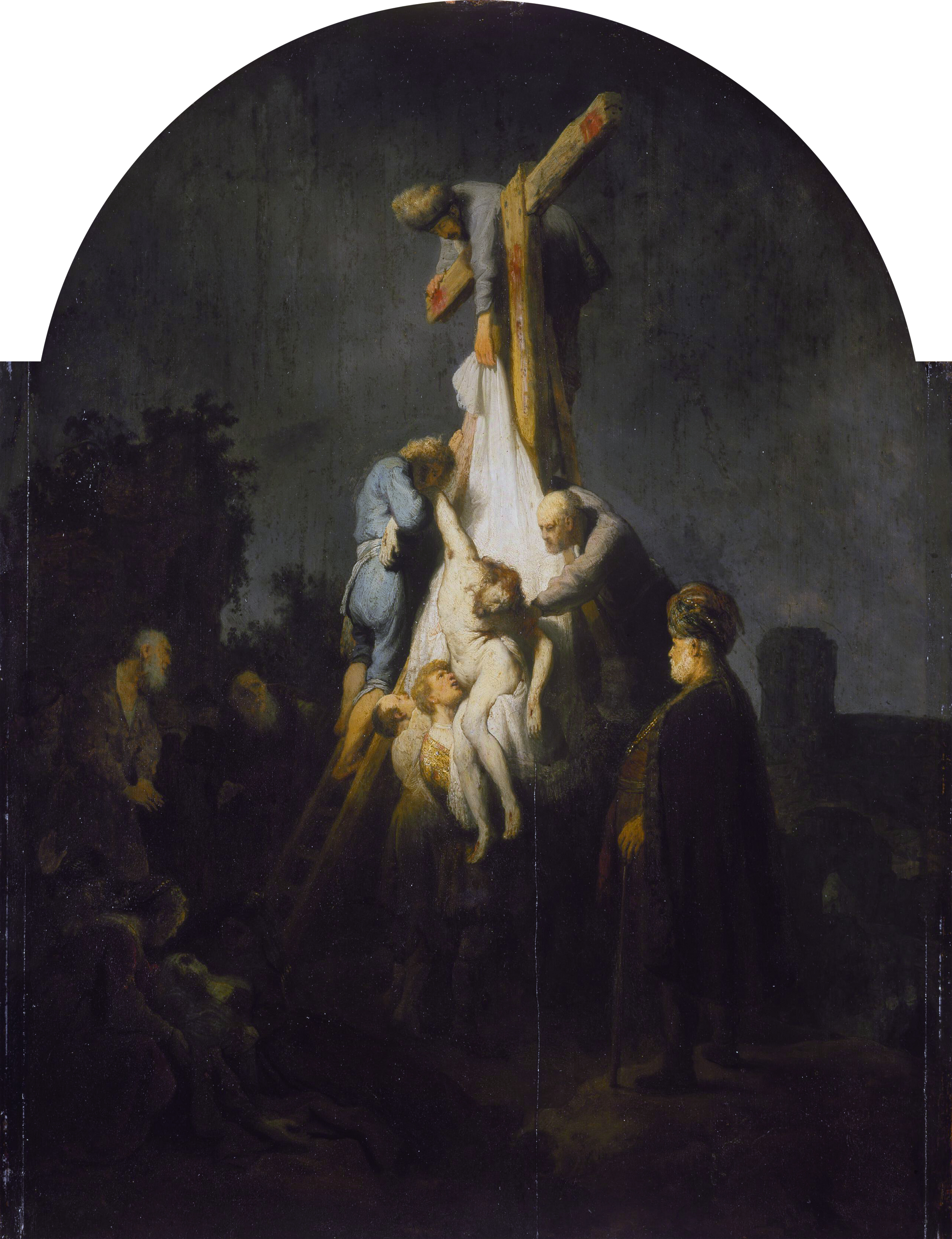
Rembrandt, Descent from the Cross, 1632-33 with a literally down to earth depiction (bottom left)

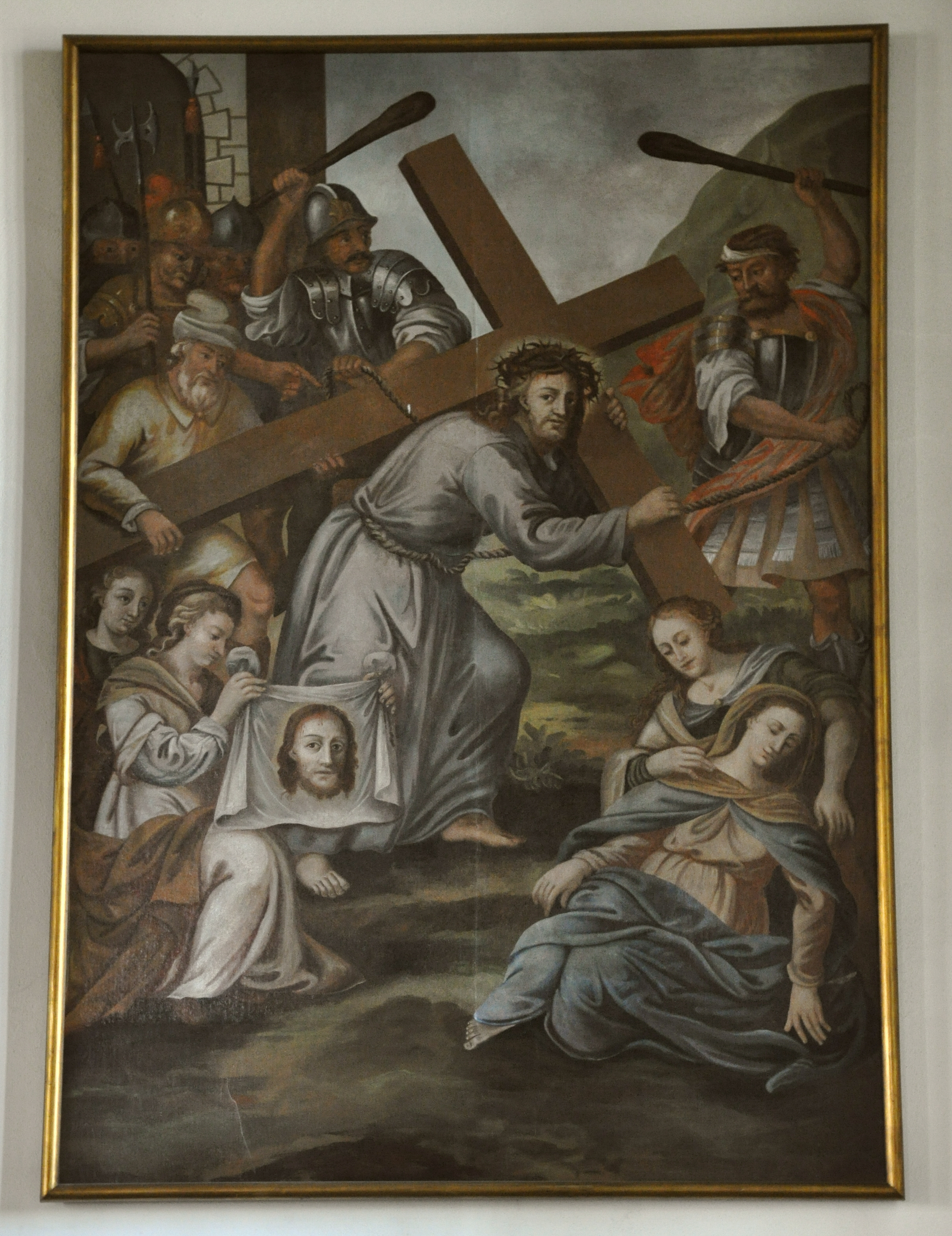
In a Christ Carrying the Cross, from a South German church
