= São Francisco River (Belo River tributary) =

River in Brazil

Location
- Country: Brazil

Physical characteristics
- Source
  - location: Paraná state
- Mouth: Belo River
  - coordinates: 24°48′S 51°18′W

The São Francisco River is a river of Paraná state in southern Brazil. Together with the Marrecas River it is the source of the Belo River in Prudentópolis.

== See also ==
- List of rivers of Paraná
