= Saint Francis in Ecstasy =

Saint Francis (of Assisi) in Ecstasy is the title of several paintings:

- Saint Francis in Ecstasy (Bellini)
- Saint Francis in Ecstasy (Reni)
- Saint Francis in Ecstasy (Zurbarán)
- Saint Francis of Assisi in Ecstasy (Caravaggio)
- Saint Francis of Assisi in Ecstasy (El Greco, 1600)
