= Francisco Costa (Brazilian politician) =

Brazilian politician (born 1979)

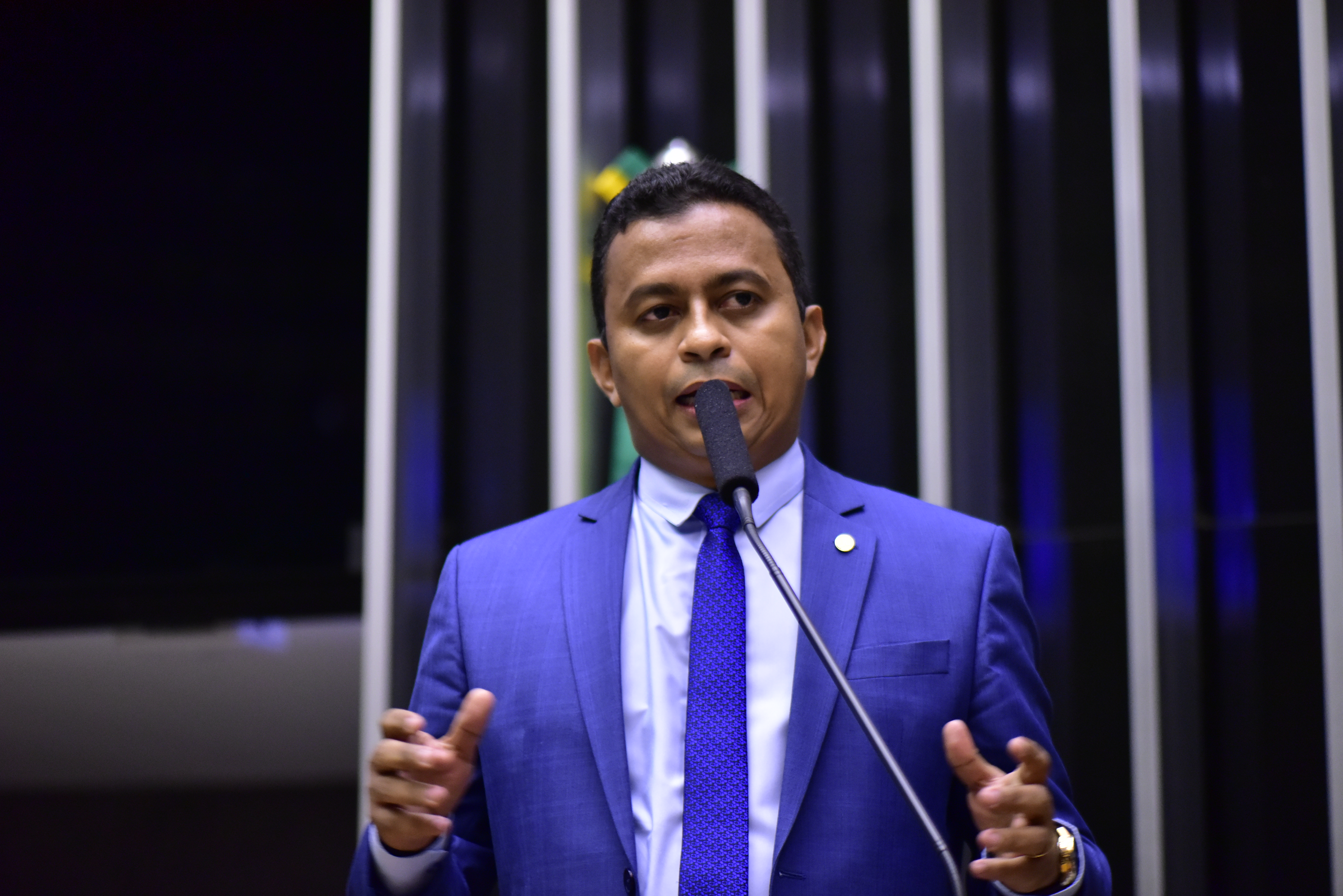
- Costa in 2023

Member of the Chamber of Deputies
- Incumbent
- Assumed office 1 February 2023
- Constituency: Piauí

Member of the Legislative Assembly of Piauí
- In office 1 February 2019 – 1 February 2023
- Constituency: At-large

Personal details
- Born: Francisco de Assis de Oliveira Costa; 14 October 1979 (age 47) São Francisco do Piauí, Piauí, Brazil
- Party: PT (since 2003)
- Education: Federal University of Campina Grande
- Profession: Physician

Francisco de Assis de Oliveira Costa (born 14 October 1979) is a Brazilian politician serving as a member of the Chamber of Deputies since 2023. From 2019 to 2022, he was a member of the Legislative Assembly of Piauí. From 2009 to 2014, he served as mayor of São Francisco do Piauí.
