= São Francisco de Paula =

São Francisco de Paula, Portuguese for Saint Francis of Paola, may refer to:

- São Francisco de Paula, Minas Gerais, a municipality in Minas Gerais
- São Francisco de Paula, Rio Grande do Sul, a municipality in Rio Grande do Sul
- São Francisco de Paula National Forest, national forest in Rio Grande do Sul

== See also ==
- São Francisco (disambiguation)
