= Belo River (Ivaí River tributary) =

Location
- Country: Brazil

Physical characteristics
- Source
  - location: Paraná state
- Mouth: Ivaí River
  - coordinates: 24°46′S 51°20′W

The Belo River is a river of Paraná state in southeastern Brazil. Formed by the merger of the Marrecas and São Francisco rivers, and flowing into the Ivaí River, it is only about 5km long.

== See also ==
- List of rivers of Paraná
