= San Francisco station (disambiguation) =

San Francisco station is a train station in San Francisco, California.

San Francisco station may also refer to:

- San Francisco station (Puerto Rico), in San Juan
- San Francisco (Madrid Metro), Spain
- San Francisco metro station (Quito), Ecuador
- San Francisco (Mexibús, Line 1), Tecámac, Mexico
- San Francisco (Mexibús, Line 2), Coacalco de Berriozábal, México

== See also ==
- San Francisco (disambiguation)
