= St. Francois Township =

St. Francois Township is the name of four townships in the U.S. state of Missouri:

- St. Francois Township, Butler County, Missouri
- St. Francois Township, Madison County, Missouri
- St. Francois Township, Saint Francois County, Missouri
- St. Francois Township, Wayne County, Missouri

== See also ==
- Saint-François (disambiguation)
