= Christ taking leave of his Mother =

Theme in Christian art

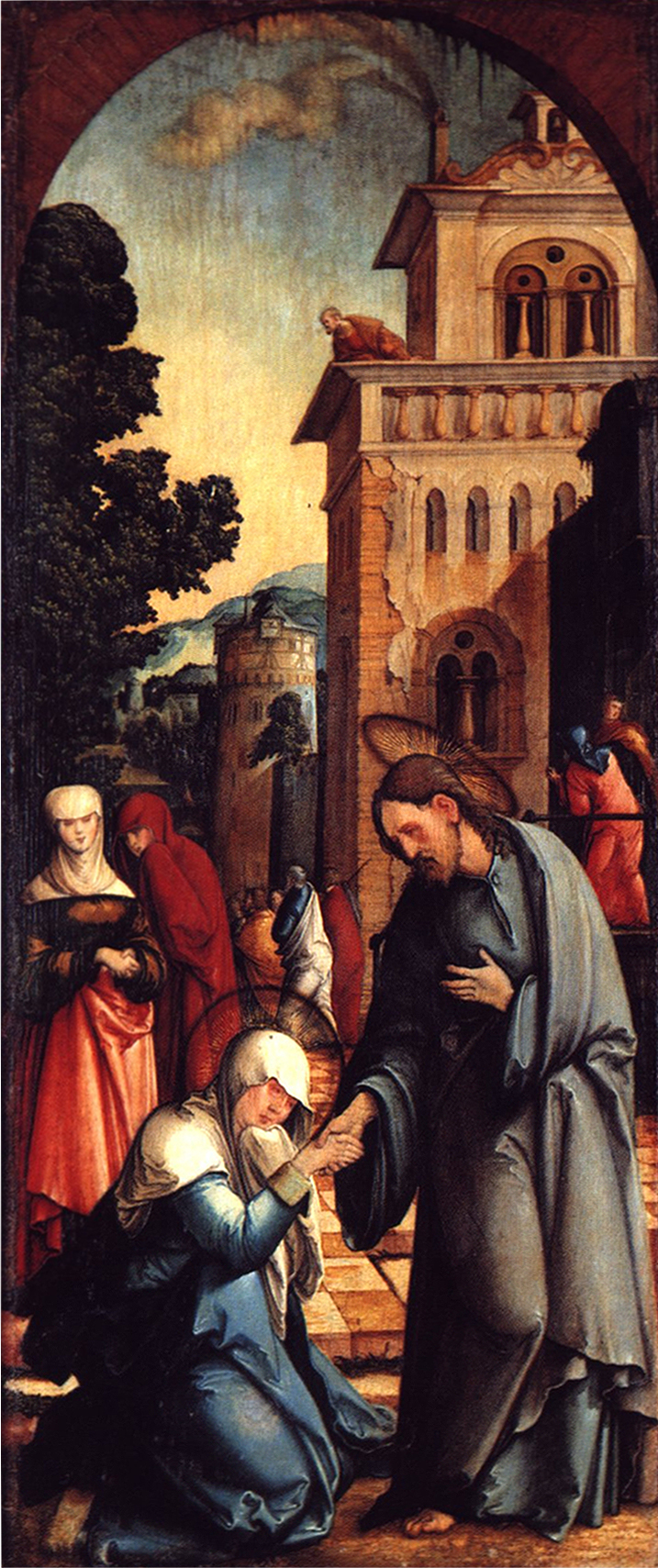
Christ taking leave of his Mother, Germany, 1536

Christ taking leave of his Mother is a subject in Christian art, most commonly (although not exclusively) found in Northern European art of the 15th and 16th centuries. Christ says farewell to his mother Mary, often blessing her, before leaving for his final journey to Jerusalem, which he knows will lead to his Passion and death; indeed this scene marks the beginning of his Passion. In early versions just these two figures are usually shown, at half-length or less.

After Dürer the subject usually has a landscape setting and includes attendants (usually the Three Marys) to Mary, who often swoons with distress and is held by them. Saints Peter, John the Evangelist, Mary Magdalen and other apostles may be shown. It is probably more common in prints than paintings.

== Subject matter ==
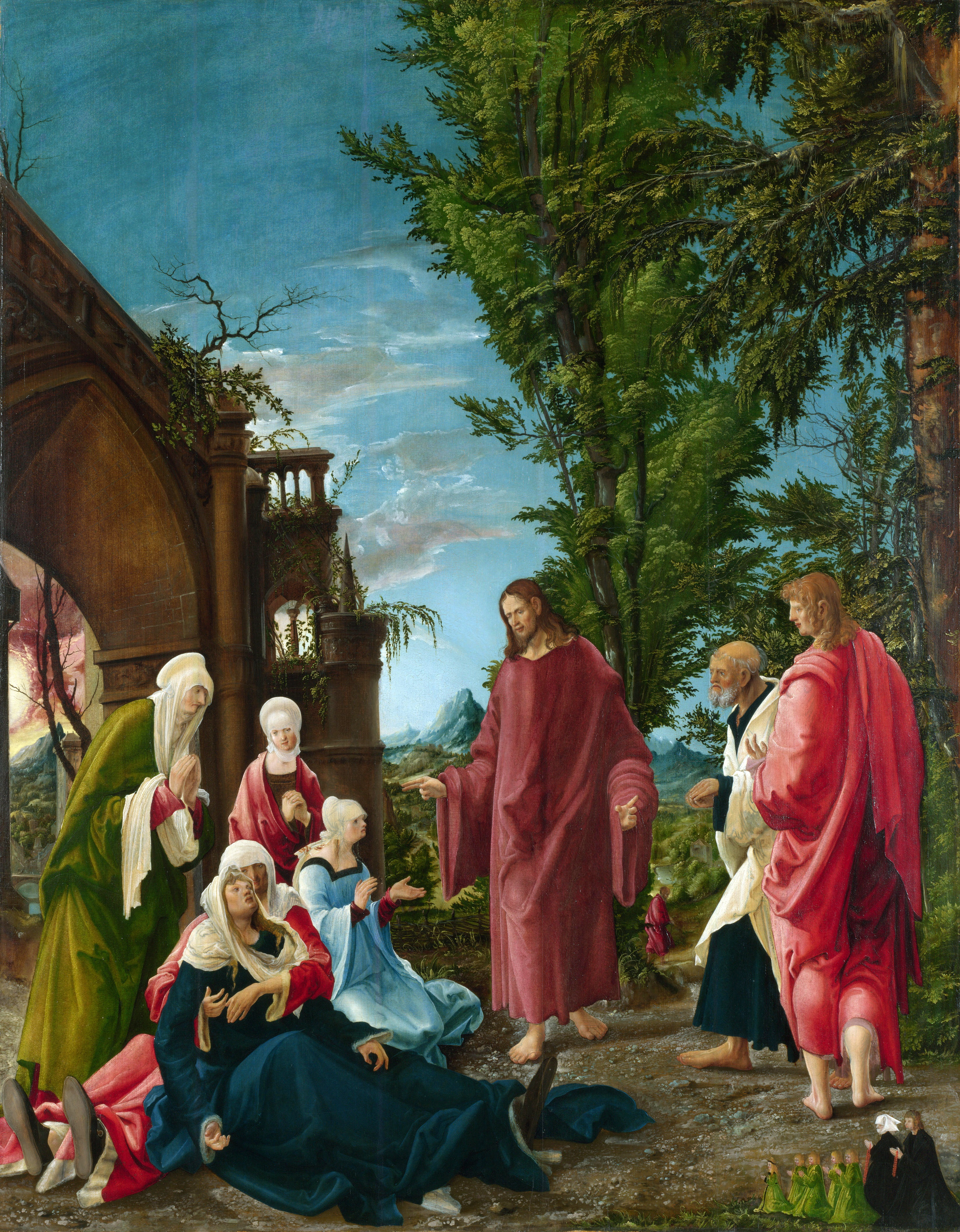
Christ taking Leave of his Mother, by Albrecht Altdorfer c. 1520, one of the treatments with a landscape background.

The subject does not illustrate any Biblical passage, but derives from one of the Pseudo-Bonaventura's "Meditations on the life of Christ" (1308), and the "Marienleben" (German for "Life of the Virgin"; about 1300) by Philipp von Seitz, also known as "Brother Philipp, the Carthusian". The scene became used in Passion plays and other religious dramas. It may be depicted in Christ Blessing with the Virgin in Prayer, a work by Robert Campin of the early 15th century, and is painted several times by Gerard David at the end of the century (Dublin, Basel, Munich, Metropolitan New York); many lesser artists were painting the subject by then, especially in Germany.

Awareness of the subject was further spread by prints, by Albrecht Dürer in his very popular woodcut series on the Life of the Virgin (ca. 1505), and again in his woodcut Passion series (1509), and also by Lucas van Leyden. As was by then often the case, many provincial painters used the compositions of the prints directly as a basis for their paintings, for example a version from his eponymous altarpiece by the Nuremberg painter known as the "Master of the Schwabach Altarpiece"(1506, Compton Verney House), who uses his fellow-townsman Dürer.

The first third of the 16th century was the period of peak popularity for the subject; to the Danube School in particular the opportunities for expressiveness and a landscape background made the subject attractive. Versions include very intense ones by Albrecht Altdorfer, and Wolf Huber (both about 1520 and in the National Gallery, London). The Huber is a cut-down fragment with just the group around the Virgin, and Christ's arm coming in from the right. Both of these works have a lush forest background, a swooning Virgin, and show the female figures in largely contemporary dress.

One of the earliest of the few Italian depictions, an early Correggio of about 1514 (National Gallery, London) clearly (under x-rays) used Dürer's composition as a starting point, before changing it around. Lorenzo Lotto (1521, Gemäldegalerie, Berlin) also painted the subject, and there is a Lucas Cranach the Elder (ca 1520) in Vienna. After 1550 the subject is seen less often, though the Pitti Palace has a work that is at least from the school of Paolo Veronese. A painting by El Greco of 1595 is something of an outlier.

== Gallery ==
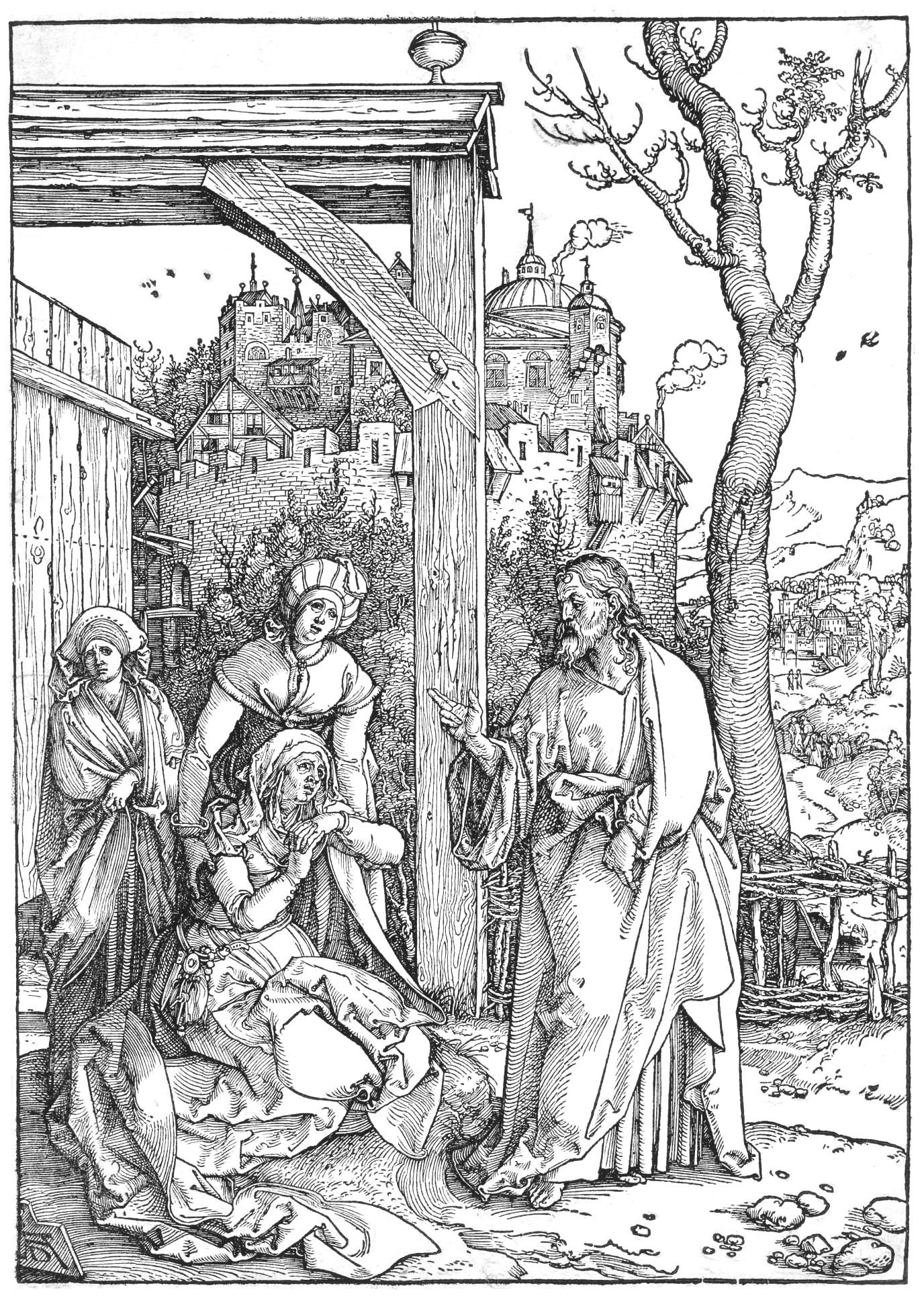
Albrecht Dürer, woodcut, 29.5 × 21.1 cm, from the series on the Life of the Virgin, c. 1507

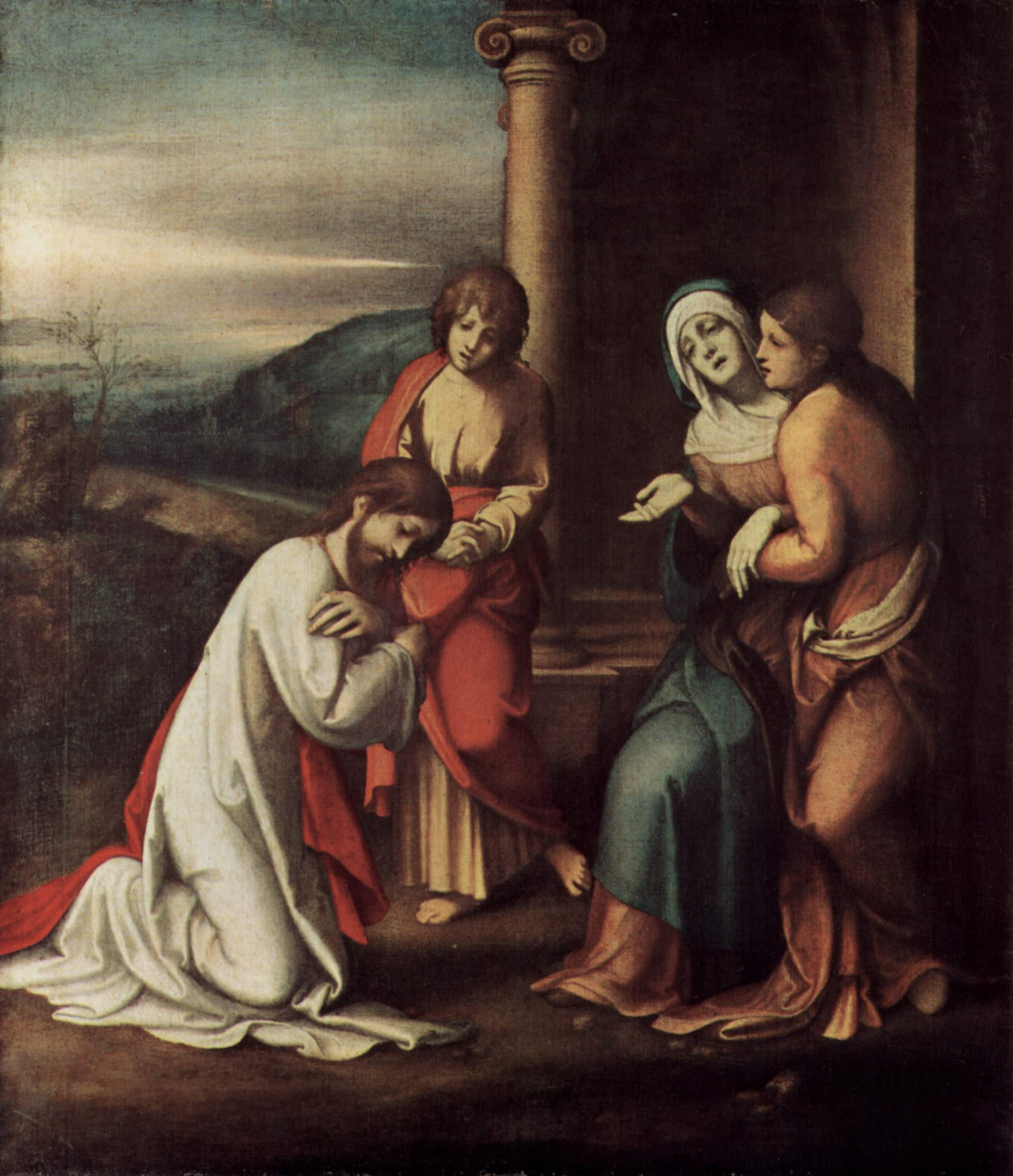
Correggio, probably before 1514, London, with John the Evangelist and (?) Mary Magdalene.

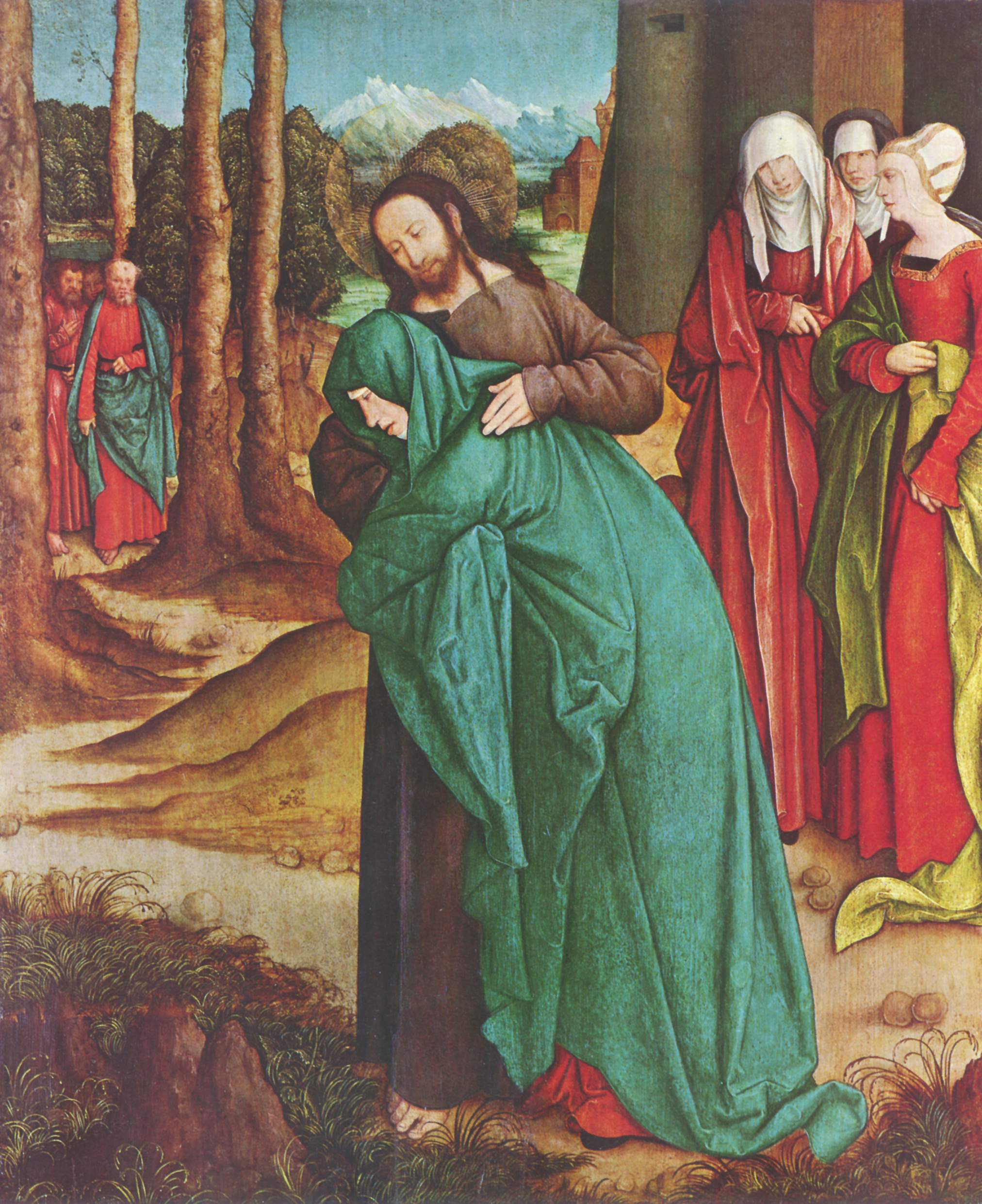
Bernhard Strigel, 1520, Berlin. Saint Peter heads the disciples waiting for Christ.

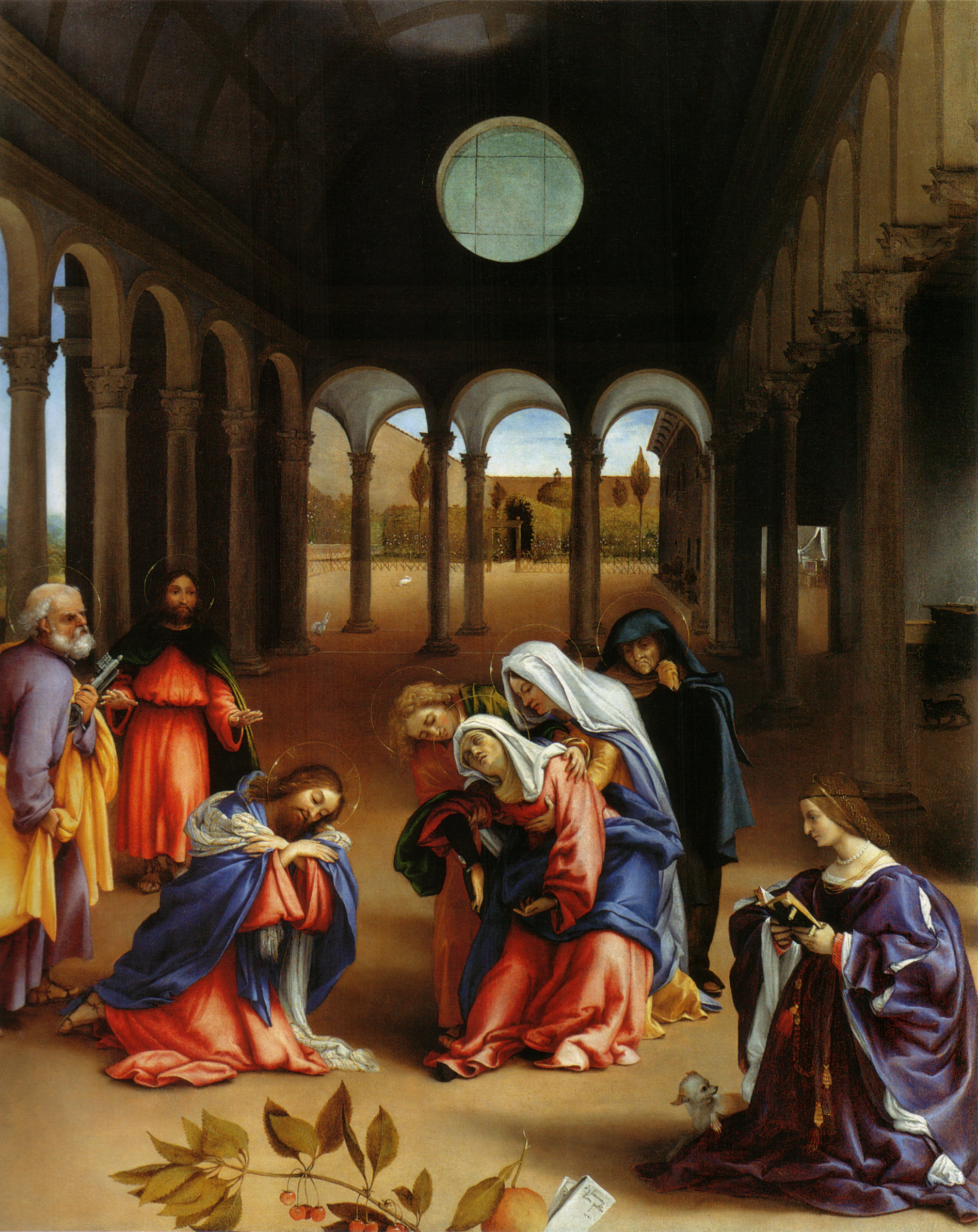
Lorenzo Lotto 1521, Berlin, with Saint Peter, Saint John and Mary Magdalene.

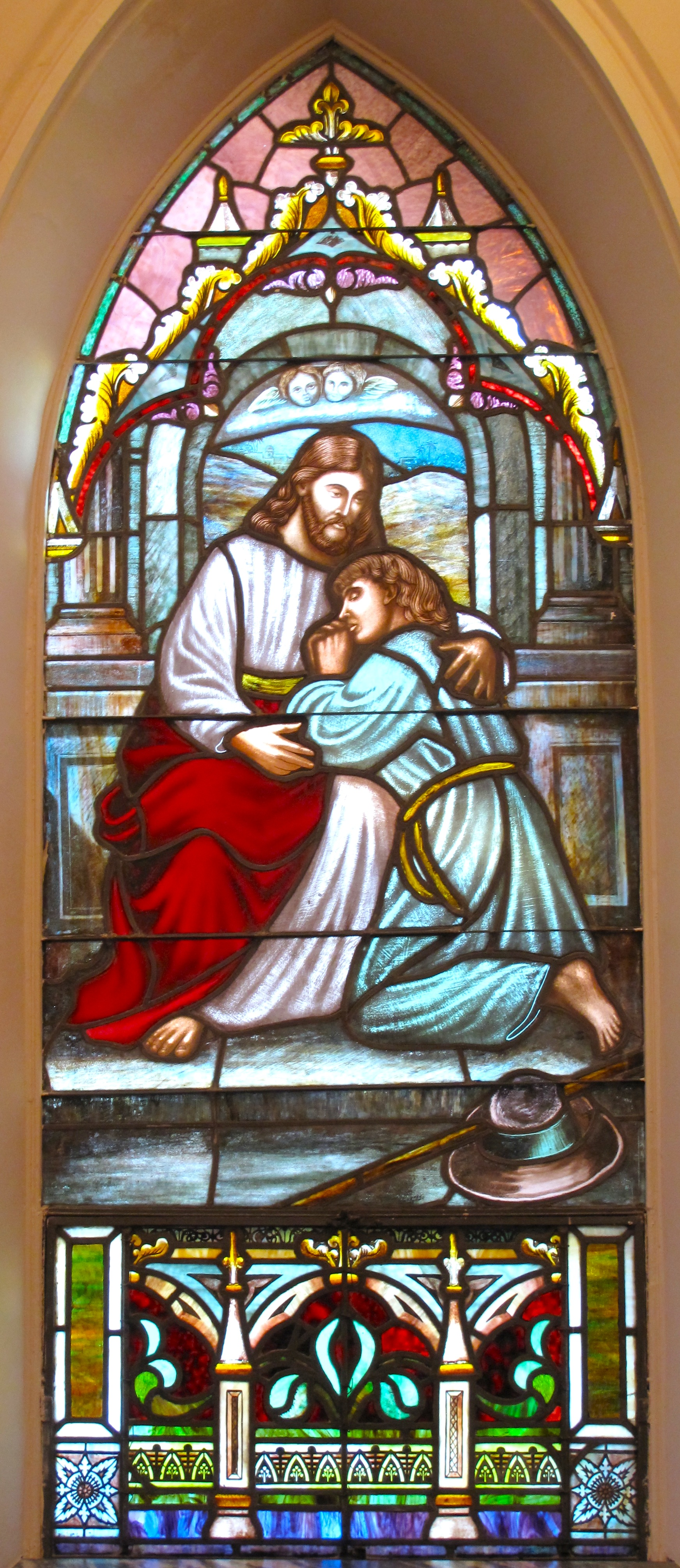
Stained glass window by Quaker City Glass Company, 1912 at St. Matthew's German Evangelical Lutheran Church in Charleston, SC.

== See also ==
- Life of Jesus in the New Testament
- Roman Catholic Marian art
