= San Francisco attack =

San Francisco attack may refer to:

- San Francisco riot of 1877
- Preparedness Day Bombing (1916)
- San Francisco Police Department Park Station bombing (1970)
- Golden Dragon massacre (1977)
- 101 California Street shooting (1993)
- Edwin Ramos shootings (2008)
- San Francisco UPS shooting (2017)
