= Malnia =

Malnia Mallnie
- Village
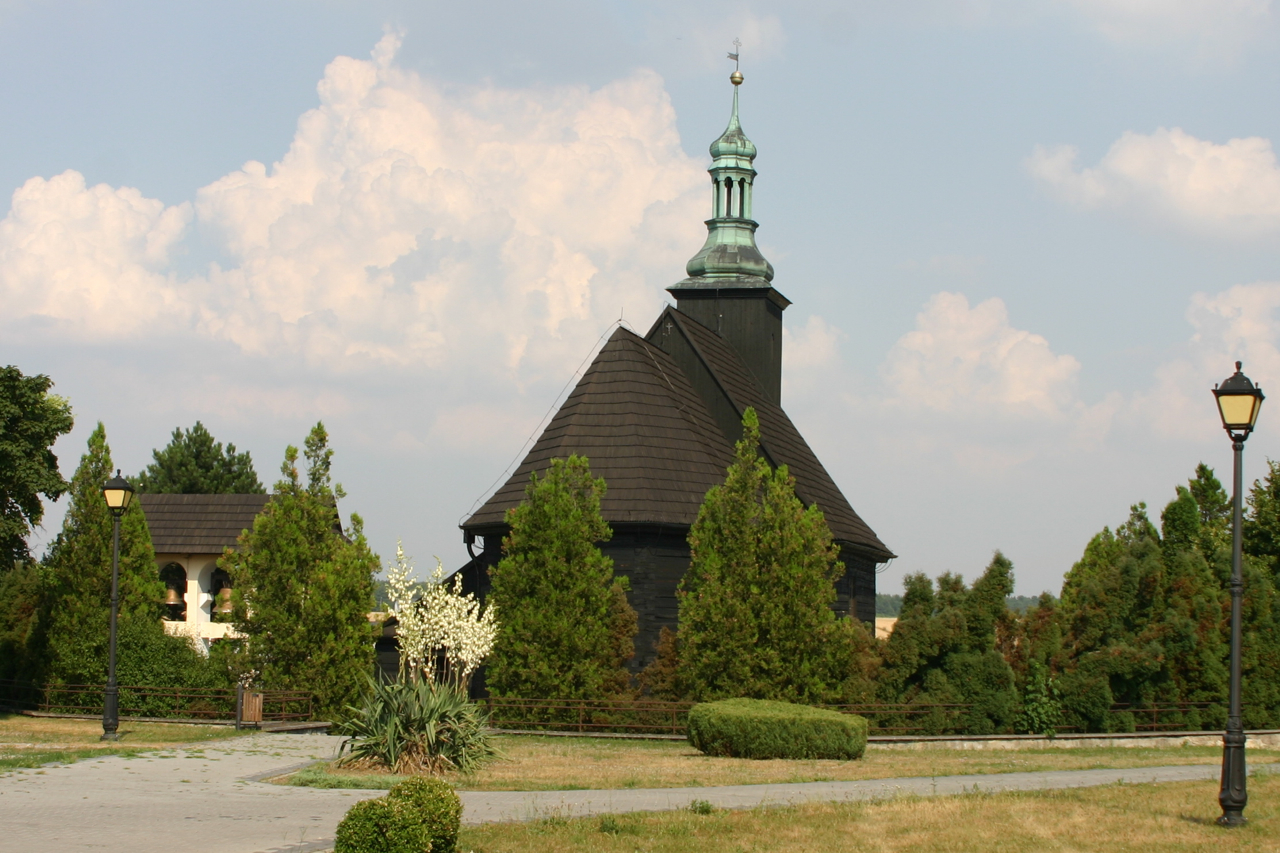
- Church of Saint Francis

- Location within Poland
- Coordinates: 50°31′N 17°58′E
- Country: Poland
- Voivodeship: Opole
- County: Krapkowice
- Gmina: Gogolin

Population
  - Total: 685
- Postal code: 47-316
- Website: http://www.malnia.pl/

Malnia ([ˈmalɲa], additional name in German: Mallnie) is a village in the administrative district of Gmina Gogolin, within Krapkowice County, Opole Voivodeship, in southern Poland.
