= Marrecas River (Belo River tributary) =

River in Brazil

Location
- Country: Brazil

Physical characteristics
- Source
  - location: Paraná state
- Mouth: Belo River
  - coordinates: 24°48′S 51°20′W

The Marrecas River is a river of Paraná state in southern Brazil. It is a tributary of the Belo River.

== See also ==
- List of rivers of Paraná
