= San Francisco Declaration =

San Francisco Declaration may refer to:

- San Francisco Declaration on Research Assessment
- San Francisco Declaration on the Secure Foundations of Enduring Prosperity
- Treaty of San Francisco
