= St. Francis of Assisi, Halstead =

St Francis of Assisi,
- St Francis of Assisi Church, Halstead
- St Francis of Assisi,
- 51°56′36″N 0°38′42″E
- Country: England
- Denomination: Roman Catholic
- Website: https://stfrancishalstead.org/

Administration
- Diocese: Roman Catholic Diocese of Brentwood
- Deanery: North, Essex

Clergy
- Priest: Joseph Whisstock

St Francis of Assisi, Halstead is a Catholic parish church in Halstead, Essex.

== History ==
Acorrding to the Deanery overseeing Halstead:

- In 1897, Cardinal Vaughan visited Halstead to deliver lectures about the Catholic Faith and due to his visit, Mass was declared to be celebrated once a month in a room in the street of Rosemary Lane.
- In 1928, a temporary church was set up (which now serves at the Church Hall),
- In 1955, after 58 years of not having a church (since Cardinal Vaughan visited and Mass began to be celebrated in Halstead), the St. Francis of Assisi Church, Halstead was opened.
