= San Francisco, La Guajira =

San Francisco
- Vereda
- Location in La Guajira and Colombia San Francisco (Colombia)
- Coordinates: 10°59′48″N 73°26′5″W
- Country: Colombia
- Department: La Guajira Department
- Municipality: Dibulla Municipality
- Elevation: 4,239 ft (1,292 m)
- Time zone: UTC-5 (Colombia Standard Time)

San Francisco is a vereda in Dibulla Municipality, La Guajira Department in Colombia.

== Climate ==
San Francisco has a tropical monsoon climate (Am) with moderate to little rainfall from December to March and heavy to very heavy rainfall from April to November.

Climate data for San Francisco
Month	Jan	Feb	Mar	Apr	May	Jun	Jul	Aug	Sep	Oct	Nov	Dec	Year
Mean daily maximum °C (°F)	23.7 (74.7)	24.7 (76.5)	24.9 (76.8)	25.0 (77.0)	25.0 (77.0)	24.9 (76.8)	25.5 (77.9)	25.4 (77.7)	24.6 (76.3)	23.7 (74.7)	23.7 (74.7)	24.3 (75.7)	24.6 (76.3)
Daily mean °C (°F)	18.4 (65.1)	18.9 (66.0)	19.4 (66.9)	19.7 (67.5)	19.7 (67.5)	20.0 (68.0)	20.1 (68.2)	19.9 (67.8)	19.7 (67.5)	19.2 (66.6)	19.0 (66.2)	18.5 (65.3)	19.4 (66.9)
Mean daily minimum °C (°F)	13.1 (55.6)	13.2 (55.8)	14.0 (57.2)	14.5 (58.1)	14.5 (58.1)	15.2 (59.4)	14.7 (58.5)	14.5 (58.1)	14.9 (58.8)	14.8 (58.6)	14.4 (57.9)	12.8 (55.0)	14.2 (57.6)
Average rainfall mm (inches)	31 (1.2)	33 (1.3)	59 (2.3)	215 (8.5)	363 (14.3)	194 (7.6)	122 (4.8)	226 (8.9)	309 (12.2)	432 (17.0)	280 (11.0)	70 (2.8)	2,334 (91.9)
Source: Climate-Data.org
