= University of Saint Francis =

University of Saint Francis, Saint Francis University or Saint Francis College may refer to:

- St. Francis College (Maine), a former name of the University of New England in Portland, Maine
- St. Francis College, in Brooklyn Heights, New York
- St. Francis' College, in Lucknow, India
- Saint Francis University, in Loretto, Pennsylvania
- Saint Francis University (Hong Kong), in Tiu Keng Leng, Hong Kong
- University of St. Francis (Joliet), in Joliet, Illinois
- University of Saint Francis (Indiana), in Fort Wayne, Indiana
- University of San Francisco, in San Francisco, California

== See also ==
- Saint Francis (disambiguation)
