= Saint-François (Thionville) =

Human settlement in France

Saint-François is a district of the French commune of Thionville in the Moselle department and the Grand Est region. It had a population of just over 5,000 in the 2010s.

== Geography ==
This district is located in the east of the Thionville municipality, north of the city center. The Moselle River runs through it.

A part of Saint-François, next to the hillside, is called La Malgrange.

=== Public transportation ===
Between 1903 and 1935, this district was served by the line from Thionville to Mondorf-les-Bains.

== Toponymy ==
During the German occupation, the district was renamed Sankt Franz, otherwise written St. Franz. In French Lorraine: Sankt-Franz.

== History ==
In 1828, Saint-François was a suburb located within cannon range of the ramparts of Thionville. It was then mostly inhabited by gardeners who supplied the town. This portion of territory is cultivated correctly; its products are similar to the products of the Sablon territory in Metz.

In 1828, the district included ninety-one houses which were all surrounded by gardens. Their inhabitants were prosperous. Around 1910, Saint-François (S. Franz) had 225 inhabitants.

== Civil and religious buildings ==
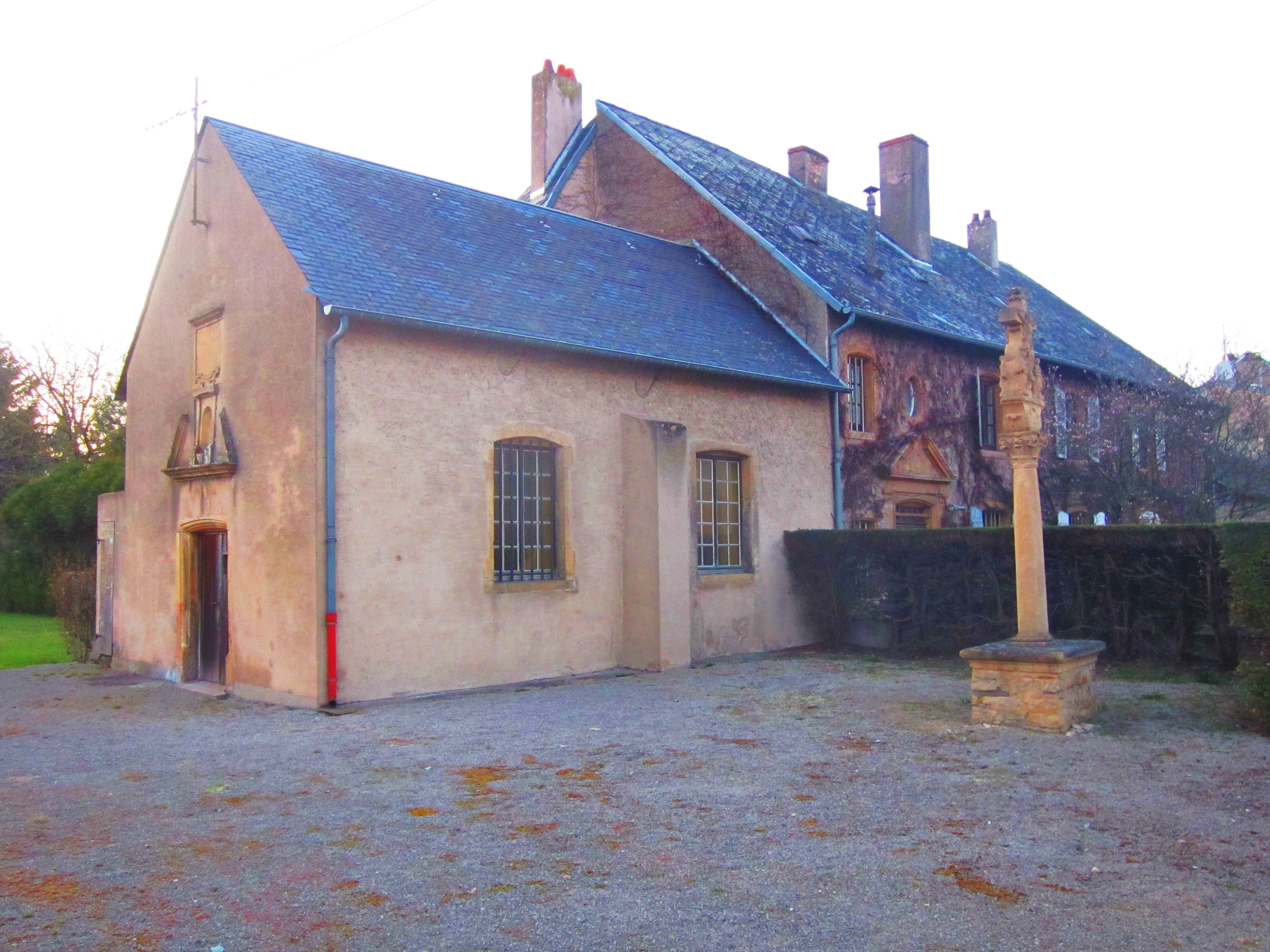
Chapelle lepreux Thionville

The Sainte-Suzanne Cemetery is located nearby. There was a small chapel in this suburb which was sold and is no longer dedicated to worship.
