= Saint Francis of Assisi in Ecstasy (El Greco, 1600) =

Painting by El Greco

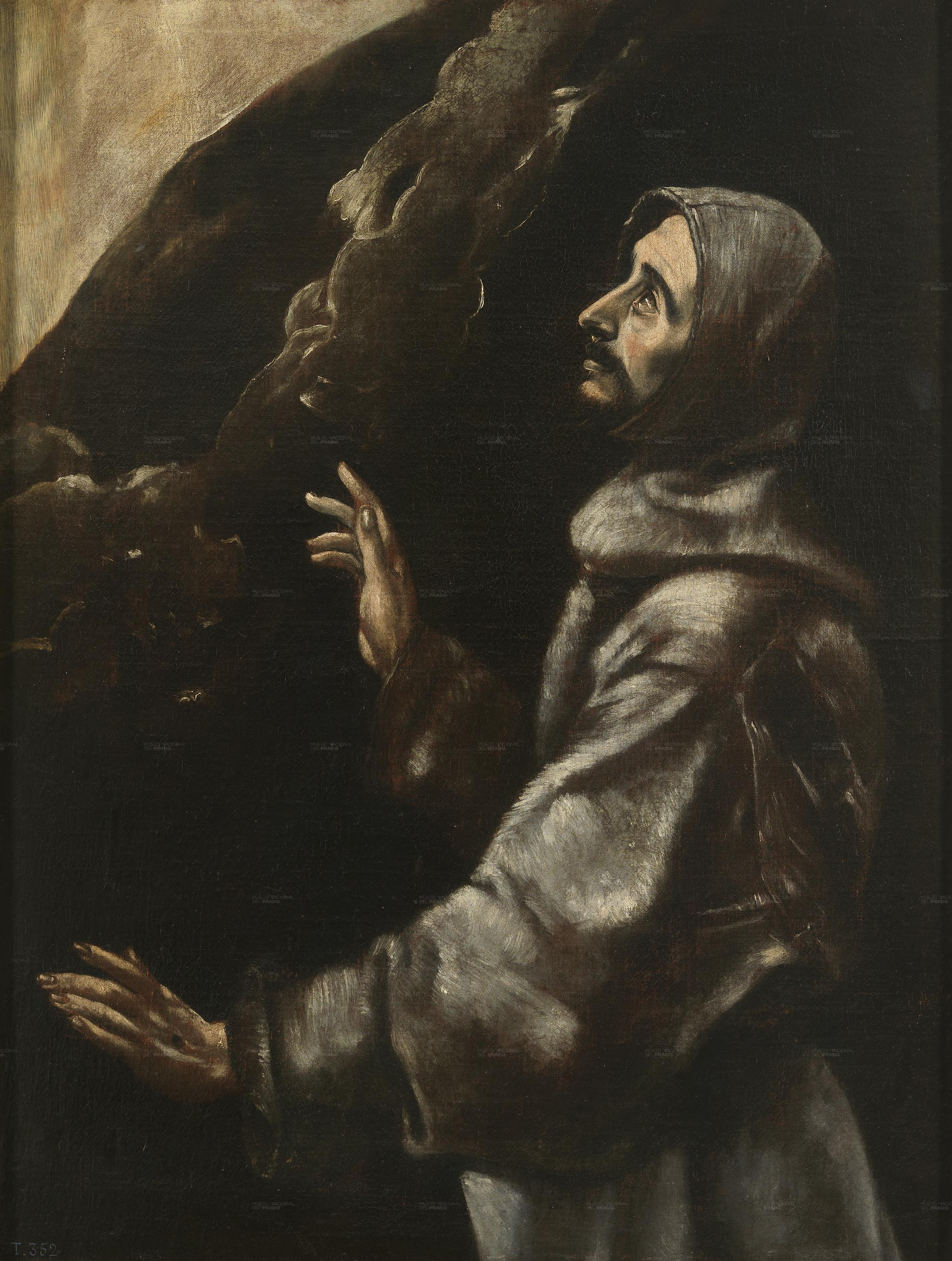
- The Prado work.
- Artist: El Greco
- Year: c.1600
- Medium: oil on canvas

Saint Francis of Assisi in Ecstasy is a lost painting by El Greco. A c.1600 work in the collection of the Museo del Prado (but hanging in the El Greco Museum, Toledo) was once thought to be the work itself, but is now thought to be an anonymous 17th century copy of it, a work by one of his followers or a work from his studio.

== Similar El Greco paintings ==
Other paintings of similar scenes, attributed to El Greco, include:

- Saint Francis in Ecstasy, 1577-1580 (Museo Lázaro Galdiano, Madrid)
- Saint Francis Receiving the Stigmata, 1578(?) (Diocesan Museum in Siedlce, Siedlce)
- Saint Francis Receiving the Stigmata, 1580 (Meadows Museum, Dallas)
- Ecstasy of Saint Francis, 1597-1603 (private collection)

== Bibliography (in Spanish) ==
- Álvarez Lopera, José, El Greco, Madrid, Arlanza, 2005, Biblioteca «Descubrir el Arte», (colección «Grandes maestros»). ISBN 84-9550-344-1.
- Scholz-Hansel, Michael, El Greco, Colonia, Taschen, 2003. ISBN 978-3-8228-3173-1.
- museodelprado.es
