= Saint-François-Xavier-de-Viger =

- Municipality

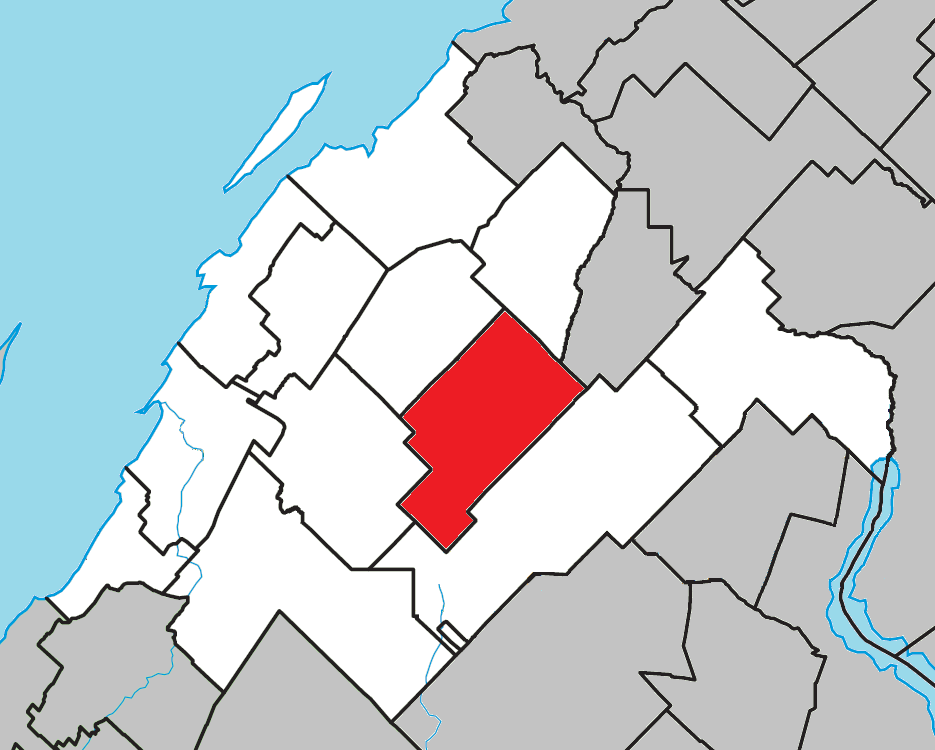
- Location within Rivière-du-Loup RCM

- Location in eastern Quebec
- Coordinates: 47°51′N 69°15′W
- Country: Canada
- Province: Quebec
- Region: Bas-Saint-Laurent
- RCM: Rivière-du-Loup
- Constituted: January 1, 1950

Government
  - Mayor: Bernard Tardif
  - Federal riding: Côte-du-Sud—Rivière-du-Loup—Kataskomiq—Témiscouata
  - Prov. riding: Rivière-du-Loup–Témiscouata–Les Basques

Area
  - Total: 112.10 km^{2} (43.28 sq mi)
  - Land: 111.27 km^{2} (42.96 sq mi)

Population (2021)
  - Total: 247
  - Density: 2.2/km^{2} (5.7/sq mi)
  - Pop 2016-2021: ▲0.8%
  - Dwellings: 137
- Time zone: UTC−5 (EST)
  - Summer (DST): UTC−4 (EDT)
- Postal code(s): G0L 3C0
- Area codes: 418 and 581
- Highways: R-291
- Website: www.municipalite.saint-francois-xavier-de-viger.qc.ca

Saint-François-Xavier-de-Viger (French pronunciation: [sɛ̃ fʁɑ̃swa ɡzavje də viʒe]) is a municipality in Quebec, Canada.

== History ==
Although settlers had already established themselves in the area around 1870 and a parish had been established that year, it was disbanded in 1892 due to the small size of the local population. It was re-established in 1948, swiftly followed by the formation of the municipality in 1950, following the separation of parts of the territories of the municipalities of Saint-Épiphane and Saint-Hubert.

== See also ==
- List of municipalities in Quebec
