= São Francisco de Assis do Piauí =

- Municipality

- Location in Brazil
- Coordinates: 8°14′16″S 41°41′9″W
- Country: Brazil
- Region: Nordeste
- State: Piauí
- Mesoregion: Sudeste Piauiense

Population (2020)
  - Total: 5,779
- Time zone: UTC−3 (BRT)

São Francisco de Assis do Piauí is a municipality in the state of Piauí in the Northeast region of Brazil.

== See also ==
- List of municipalities in Piauí
