= São Francisco, Paraíba =

Coordinates: 6°37′08″S 38°05′38″W

- Municipality
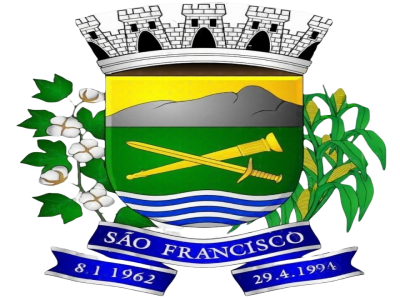
- Flag Coat of arms
- Interactive map of São Francisco, Paraíba
- Country: Brazil
- Region: Northeast
- State: Paraíba
- Mesoregion: Sertao Paraibana

Population (2020)
  - Total: 3,384
- Time zone: UTC−3 (BRT)

São Francisco, Paraíba is a municipality in the state of Paraíba in the Northeast Region of Brazil.

== See also ==
- List of municipalities in Paraíba
