= São Francisco do Brejão =

Coordinates: 5.12278°S 47.3858°W

- Municipality
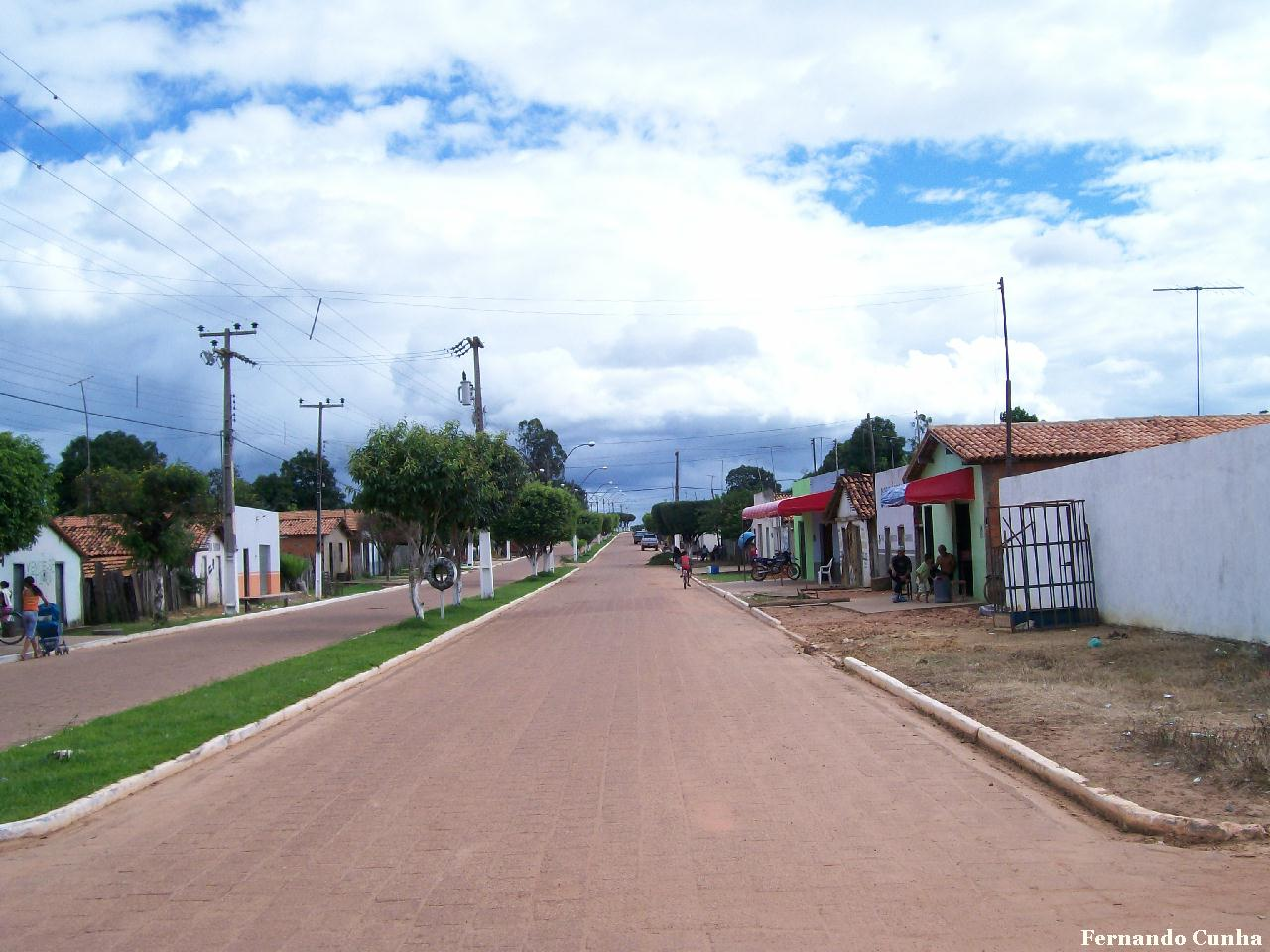
- Interactive map of São Francisco do Brejão
- Country: Brazil
- Region: Nordeste
- State: Maranhão
- Mesoregion: Oeste Maranhense

Population (2020)
  - Total: 11,941
- Time zone: UTC−3 (BRT)

São Francisco do Brejão is a municipality in the state of Maranhão in the Northeast region of Brazil.

== See also ==
- List of municipalities in Maranhão
