= Saint-François-de-Sales, Quebec =

Saint-François-de-Sales
- Municipality
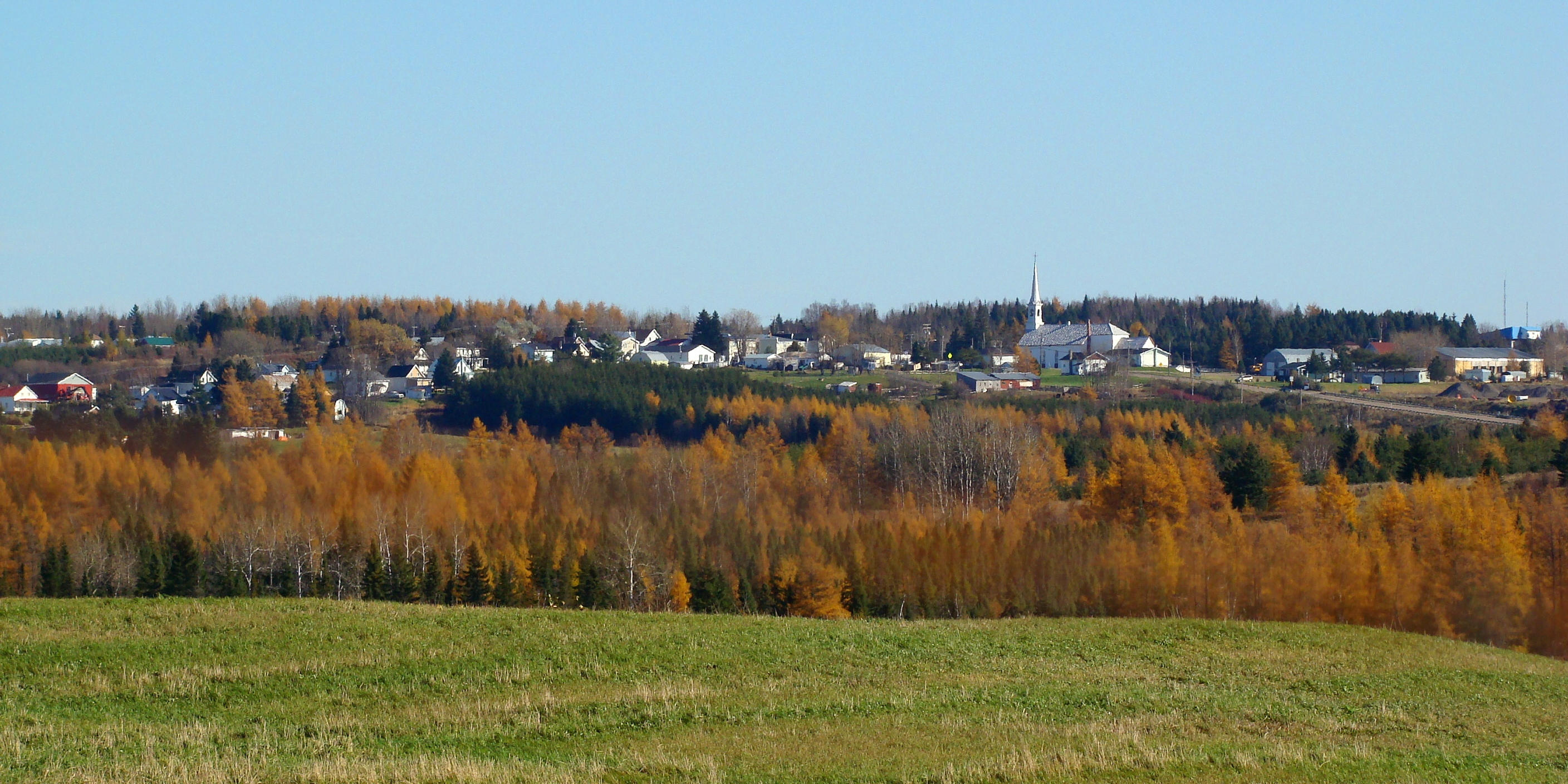

- Location in Saguenay–Lac-Saint-Jean Quebec
- Coordinates: 48°19′N 72°08′W
- Country: Canada
- Province: Quebec
- Region: Saguenay–Lac-Saint-Jean
- RCM: Le Domaine-du-Roy
- Settled: 1880s
- Constituted: May 14, 1888

Government
  - Mayor: Cindy Plourde
  - Federal riding: Lac-Saint-Jean
  - Prov. riding: Roberval

Area
  - Total: 202.00 km^{2} (77.99 sq mi)
  - Land: 197.20 km^{2} (76.14 sq mi)

Population (2021)
  - Total: 643
  - Density: 3.3/km^{2} (8.5/sq mi)
  - Pop (2016–21): ▲4.4%
  - Dwellings: 423
- Time zone: UTC−5 (EST)
  - Summer (DST): UTC−4 (EDT)
- Postal code(s): G0W 1M0
- Area codes: 418 and 581
- Website: municipalites-du-quebec.com/saint-francois-de-sales/

Saint-François-de-Sales (French pronunciation: [sɛ̃ fʁɑ̃swa də sal]) is a municipality in Quebec, Canada.

== History ==
Saint-François-de-Sales was created in 1888 when it separated from Saint-Louis-de-Métabetchouan. The municipality lost an important section in 1893 when Saint-Thomas-d'Aquin separated. Saint-François-de-Sales is one of the typical villages of the Saguenay–Lac-Saint-Jean region. The municipality's territory, located in the heart of nature next to Roberval and Chambord, 12 km from Lac Saint-Jean, covers an area of 197.2 km² of mountainous terrain in the foothills of the Laurentian Mountains. Saint-François-de-Sales is one of the main gateways to the Saguenay–Lac-Saint-Jean region. The population of Saint-François-de-Sales is mainly concentrated along a 4 km stretch of Route 155. The local economy is based primarily on the forestry industry. The municipality offers certain basic services and a few tourist attractions, including the municipal campground, which is the village's main attraction and a key draw for visitors.

== Demographics ==
Population trend:

- Population in 2021: 643 (2016 to 2021 population change: 4.4%)
- Population in 2016: 616
- Population in 2011: 654
- Population in 2006: 731
- Population in 2001: 735
- Population in 1996: 717
- Population in 1991: 832
- Population in 1986: 827
- Population in 1981: 831
- Population in 1976: 803
- Population in 1971: 840
- Population in 1966: 959
- Population in 1961: 1,184
- Population in 1956: 1,142
- Population in 1951: 1,243
- Population in 1941: 1,085
- Population in 1931: 891
- Population in 1921: 816
- Population in 1911: 767
- Population in 1901: 646
- Population in 1891: 1,124

Private dwellings occupied by usual residents: 295 (total dwellings: 423)

Mother tongue:

- English as first language: 0%
- French as first language: 98.4%
- English and French as first language: 0%
- Other as first language: 0.8%
