= Muquém de São Francisco =

Municipality of Bahia, Brazil

Muquém de São Francisco Município de Muquém de São Francisco
- Municipality
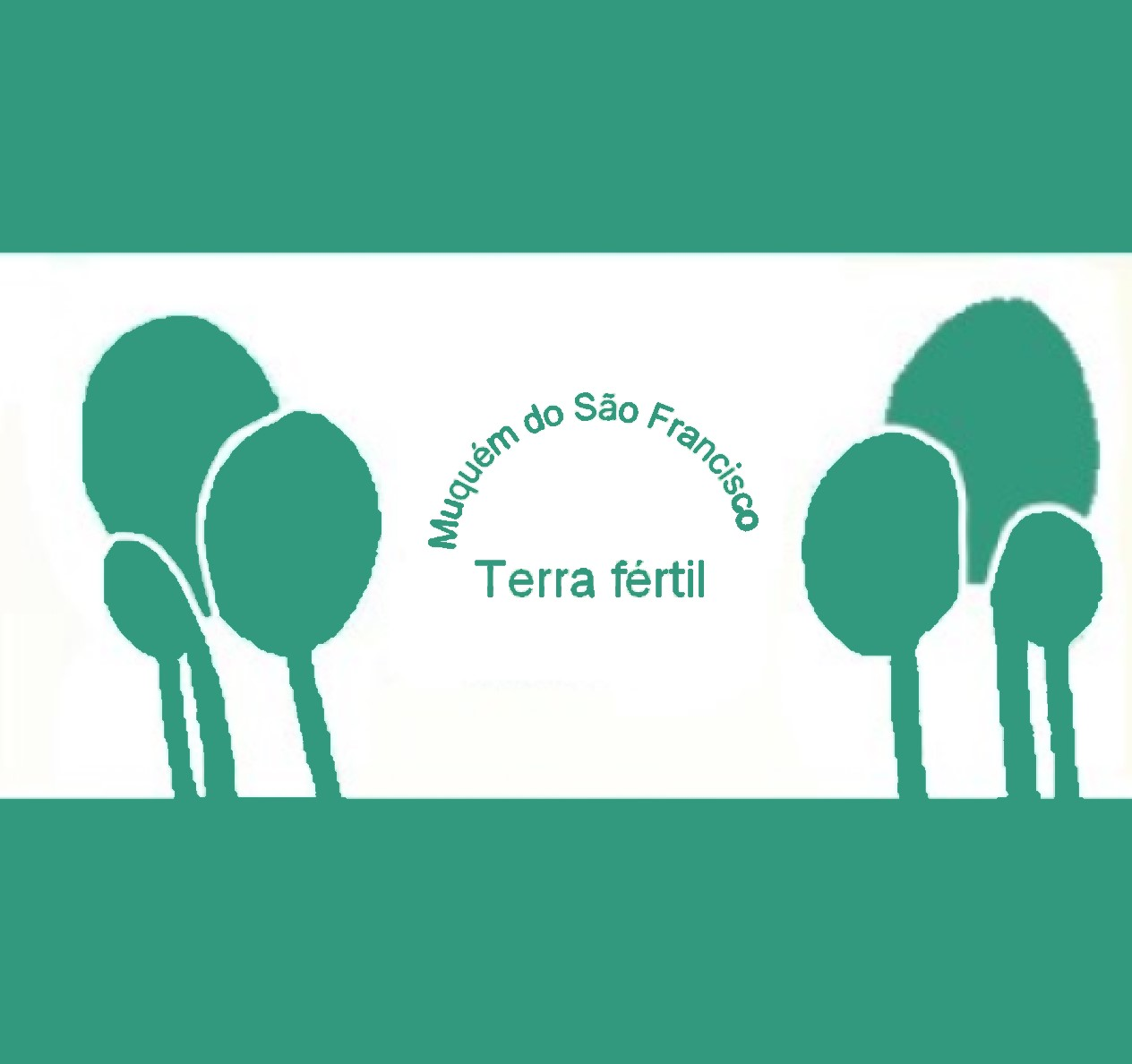
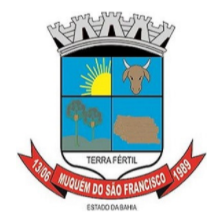
- Flag Coat of arms

- Location of Muquém de São Francisco in Bahia

- Location of Muquém de São Francisco in the Brazil
- Coordinates: 12°03′54″S 43°32′56″W
- Country: Brazil
- Region: Northeast
- State: Bahia
- Founded: 1989

Government
  - Mayor: Márcio Marciano

Area
  - Total: 3,853.2 km^{2} (1,487.7 sq mi)

Population (2020)
  - Total: 11,417
  - Density: 2.9630/km^{2} (7.6741/sq mi)
- Demonym: Sanfranciscano
- Time zone: UTC−3 (BRT)

Muquém de São Francisco is a municipality in the state of Bahia in the North-East region of Brazil. Muquém de São Francisco covers 3,853.185 km^{2} (1,487.723 mi^{2}), and has a population of 11,417 with a population density of 3 inhabitants per square kilometer.

== See also ==
- List of municipalities in Bahia
