= Franzen =

Franzen or Franzén is a Scandinavian surname. Notable people with the surname include:

- Anders Franzén (1918–1993), Swedish underwater archaeologist
- Anton Franzen (1896–1968), German lawyer and politician
- Arno Franzen, Brazilian rower
- Arvid Franzen (1899–1961), Swedish-American accordionist and bandleader
- Carin Franzén (born 1962), Swedish literary scholar
- Christian Franzen (photographer) (1864–1923), Danish photographer and diplomat based in Spain
- Christian Franzen (businessman) (1845–1920), American politician, farmer, and businessman
- Christoffer Franzén (born 1988), Swedish musician known as Lights & Motion
- Cola Franzen (1923–2018), American writer and translator
- Ellinor Franzén (born 1978), Swedish singer
- Frans Michael Franzén (1772–1847), Swedish poet
- Gustaf Franzen (born 1996), Swedish ice hockey player
- Ingemar Franzén (1927–1985), Swedish weightlifter
- Ivar Franzén (1932–2004), Swedish politician
- Jens Franzen (1937–2018), German paleontologist
- Johan Franzén (born 1979), Swedish ice hockey player
- Johan Franzén (politician) (1879–1946), Finnish farmer, bank director and politician
- John-Erik Franzén (1942–2022), Swedish artist
- Jonathan Franzen (born 1959), American novelist and essayist
- Julia Franzén (born 1990), Swedish television personality, personal trainer and life coach
- Lauro Franzen (1911–1971), Brazilian rower
- Malene Franzen (born 1970), Danish rhythmic gymnast
- Mathias Franzén, Swedish handball player
- Mathias Franzén (ice hockey) (born 1992), Swedish ice hockey player
- Matt Franzen, American football coach
- Melisa López Franzen (born 1980), American politician
- Mia Franzén (born 1971), Swedish politician
- Michelle Franzen (born 1968), American news correspondent
- Nell Franzen (1889–1973), American actress
- Nilo Franzen, Brazilian rower
- Nils Franzén (1910–1985), Swedish politician
- Nils-Olof Franzén (1916–1997), Swedish author
- Peter Franzén (born 1971), Finnish actor
- Peter Franzen, English journalist
- Rikard Franzén (born 1968), Swedish ice hockey player
- Roger Franzén (born 1964), Swedish football player and manager
- Sixten Franzén (1919–2008), Swedish scientist
- Torkel Franzén (1950–2006), Swedish academic
- Ulrich Franzen (1921–2012), German-American architect

== Places ==
- Franzen, Wisconsin, town in the United States

== See also ==
- Frantzen (disambiguation)
- Franz (disambiguation)
