= Republican Coordinating Council of Heads of Political Parties and Public Associations =

Political alliance in Belarus

Republican Coordinating Council of Heads of Political Parties and Public Associations Рэспубліканскі каардынацыйны савет кіраўнікоў палітычных партый і грамадскіх аб’яднанняў
- Abbreviation: RKSKPPHA
- Leader: Mikhail Obrazov
- Founded: 10 January 2001
- Headquarters: Minsk
- Membership (2004): 5,000,000
- Ideology: Pro-Lukashenko
- Political position: Big tent
- Slogan: «За моцную і квітнеючую Беларусь» ('For a Strong and Prosperous Belarus!')
- House of Representatives: 88 / 110

The Republican Coordinating Council of Heads of Political Parties and Public Associations (Belarusian: Рэспубліканскі каардынацыйны савет кіраўнікоў палітычных партый і грамадскіх аб’яднанняў, romanized: Respublikanski kaardynacyjny saviet kiraŭnikoŭ palityčnych partyj i hramadskich abjadnanniaŭ; RKSKPPHA; Russian: Республиканский координационный совет руководителей политических партий и общественных объединений, romanized: Respublikansky koordinatsionny sovet rukovoditeley politicheskikh partiy i obshchestvennykh obedineny; RKSRPPOO) is an electoral association of advocacy groups in support of Alexander Lukashenko, founded on 10 January 2001. The founders were representatives of the Communist Party, the Party of Labour and Justice, the Republican Party and 17 public associations. In the run-up to the 2001 presidential election, it was attended by the heads of 36 societies, which together had more than 4 million members. In those elections, the RKSKPPHA appointed 3 observers at each polling station to testify in their protocols that there were no violations by opposition observers. During the election campaign, the head of its Secretariat Mikhail Vobrazau called on law enforcement agencies to use force. In the run-up to the 2004 parliamentary election, it consisted of the heads of 43 societies, which together had more than 5 million members.

== Participants ==
The following parties took part in the work of the council:

1. Belarusian Agrarian Party - Mikhail Szymanski, chairman. Disbanded in 2023.
2. Communist Party of Belarus - Georgy Atamanov and Igor Kotlyarov, secretaries of the Central Committee (CC), and Sergei Kostyan, 2nd secretary;
3. Belarusian Patriotic Party - Mikalai Ulakhovich, chairman. Disbanded in 2023
4. Republican Party of Labour and Justice - Victor Sokolov, 1st Deputy;
5. Republican Party - Vladimir Belazor, chairman, and Victor Vitkovsky, deputy. Disbanded in 2023
6. Belarusian Social Sporting Party - Vladimir Alexandrovich, chairman. Disbanded in 2023
7. Belaya Rus (Grodno) - Witold Pestis, Chairman;

Participants from public associations were:

1. "April 26" - Mikhail Vobrazov, chairman;
2. "Unity" - Maria Khuda, chairman;
3. "Fighting Brotherhood without Borders" - Victor Sivokhin, chairman;
4. Belarusian Public Association of Veterans - Anatoly Novikov, Chairman, and Mikhail Samonov, Deputy;
5. Belarusian Pedagogical Society - Leonid Tikhonov, chairman;
6. Belarusian Republican Water Rescue Society - Anatoly Golub, chairman;
7. Belarusian Society of Friendship and Cultural Relations with Foreign Countries - Nina Ivanova, Chairman;
8. Belarusian Red Cross Society - Ludmila Postoyalko, Chairman, and Anton Romanovsky, Secretary General;
9. Belarusian Association of School Principals - Vladimir Razumovich, Chairman;
10. Belarusian Association of Industrialists and Entrepreneurs - AV Voloshin, Chairman;
11. Belarusian Association of Teachers - Nikolai Famichev, Chairman;
12. Belarusian Library Association - Peter Lapo, chairman;
13. Belarusian Scientific and Industrial Association - Valentin Radzivonov, 1st Deputy;
14. Belarusian Republican Pioneer Organization - Alexander Babitsky, Chairman;
15. Belarusian Agro-Industrial Union (until 2004 "Belarusian Council of Collective Farms") - Alexei Skakun, chairman;
16. Belarusian Committee of Youth Organizations - Leonid Averin and Alexander Yushkevich, chairmen;
17. Belarusian Peace Committee - Viktor Parfenov, Chairman;
18. Belarusian Literary Foundation - Nikolai Charginets, Chairman;
19. Belarusian Patriotic Youth Union - VL Kashtalyan, Secretary of the Central Committee, and Alexander Dolzhevsky, 2nd Secretary;
20. "Belarusian Professors' Assembly" - Valery Chardyntsev, Chairman, and Eugene Tavkachev, Deputy;
21. Belarusian Republican Youth Union - Mikhail Orda, 1st Secretary of the Central Committee;
22. Belarusian Republican Union of Lawyers - Natalia Andreychik, Deputy;
23. Belarusian Union of Officers - Dmitry Ivanov and Eugene Mikulchik, chairmen;
24. Belarusian Union of Blockades of Leningrad - Maria Yagodnitsyna, chairman;
25. Belarusian Union of War Veterans in Afghanistan - Vladimir Toestsev, Chairman;
26. Belarusian Women's Union - Nadezhda Yermakova, chair, and TG Komarovskaya and Galina Nachovkina, deputies;
27. Belarusian Union of Journalists - Grigory Sokolovsky, 1st Deputy;
28. Belarusian Union of Composers - Igor Luchenok, chairman;
29. Belarusian Union of Entrepreneurs - Sergei Pirozhnik, Deputy;
30. Belarusian Peace Foundation - Marat Yahorau, Chairman;
31. "Knowledge" - Vasily Strazhev, chairman, and Konstantin Ukrainets, 1st deputy;
32. "Troops of the Cossack Guard" - Sergei Novikov, commander;
33. "Citizens for National Security" - Maria Osipova, Chair;
34. Voluntary Society for Assistance to the Army, Aviation and Navy of the Republic of Belarus - Peter Lebedev, Deputy;
35. "Dynamo" - Yuri Borodich, chairman;
36. "For Democracy, Social Progress and Justice" - Victor Chikin, Chairman, and Leonid Shkolnikov, Deputy;
37. League for the Protection of Human Rights - Eugene Novikov, Chairman;
38. Minsk Writers' Organization - Pavel Vorobyov, chairman;
39. "Ambassadors of Slavdom" - Taisa Bondar, Chairman;
40. Rus - Ivan Korda and Gennady Vlasov, chairmen;
41. "Union" - Herald Manshin, chairman;
42. "Union Public Chamber" - Alexander Shychkov, Deputy Executive Secretary;
43. All-Belarusian United Cossacks - Nikolai Yarkovich, Supreme Ataman;
44. Federation of Trade Unions of Belarus - Leonid Kozik, Chairman, and Alexander Miksha, Deputy;
45. "Chernobyl Stork" - Natalia Parukova, Chairman;
46. "Environmental Initiative" - Yuri Solovyov, Chairman;
47. "Unity" - Vadim Borovik, chairman.
