= Frantz (given name) =

- Pronunciation: German: [fʁants]
- Gender: Masculine
- Language: German

Origin
- Languages: 1. Latin; 2. German
- Origin: 1. Franciscus; 2. Franziskus
- Region of origin: German-speaking countries

Other names
- Cognate: Francis
- Related names: Franz, Ferenc, Francisco, François, Frans, František
- See also: Franz (given name); Frantz (surname)
- Popularity: see popular names

Frantz is a masculine given name. Notable people with the name include:

- Frantz Bertin (born 1983), Haitian footballer
- Frantz Bruun (1832-1908), Norwegian priest
- Frantz Casseus (1915-1993), Haitian guitarist
- Frantz Fanon (1925-1961), Martiniquais psychiatrist
- Frantz Funck-Brentano (1862-1947), Luxembourgish French historian
- Frantz Gilles (born 1977), Haitian footballer
- Frantz Granvorka (born 1976), French volleyball player
- Frantz Hardy (born 1985), American footballer
- Frantz Heldenstein (1892-1975), Luxembourgish sculptor
- Frantz Hunt Coe (1856-1904), American physician
- Frantz Joseph (born 1986), American Canadian football player
- Frantz Kruger (born 1975), South African Finnish discus thrower
- Frantz Lender (1881-1927), Russian weapons designer
- Frantz Mathieu (21st century), Haitian footballer
- Frantz Reichel (1871-1932), French athlete
- Frantz Vitko (21st century), Belarusian trade unionist

== Fictional characters ==
- Frantz (Coppélia), character in the sentimental comic ballet Coppélia
- Frantz, character in the Japanese anime series Yu-Gi-Oh! GX
- Frantz Fuchs, character in the Hitman series of video games

== See also ==
- Franz (disambiguation)
- Frantz (disambiguation)
