= 1832 in Norway =

- Centuries: 17th; 18th; 19th; 20th; 21st
- Decades: 1810s; 1820s; 1830s; 1840s; 1850s
- See also: 1832 in Sweden; List of years in Norway

Events in the year 1832 in Norway.

== Incumbents ==
- Monarch: Charles III John.
- First Minister: Jonas Collett

== Events ==
- 11 June - 25 June – The Norwegian ultramarathoner Mensen Ernst ran about 2,500 kilometres (1,600 mi) from Paris to Moscow in 14 days.

== Arts and literature ==
- The newspaper Drammens Tidende is established.
- Det Dramatiske Selskab in Tromsø is founded.

== Births ==
- 19 March – Frantz Bruun, priest (d.1908)
- 27 May – Laura Gundersen, actor (d.1898)
- 22 July – Ananias Dekke, ships designer (died 1892).
- 1 August – Andreas Olsen Sæhlie, farmer, distillery owner and politician (d. 1895).
- 20 September – Marie Wexelsen, writer (died 1911).
- 13 October – Johan Wilhelm Eide, printer, publisher and newspaper editor (died 1896).
- 8 December – Bjørnstjerne Bjørnson, writer and the 1903 Nobel Prize in Literature laureate (d.1910).
- 15 December – Wilhelm Christopher Christophersen, diplomat (d.1913)

=== Full date unknown ===
- Nils Henrik Bruun, engineer (d.1916)
- Jens Andersen Hagen, politician
- Anders Heyerdahl, violinist, composer and folk music collector (d.1918)
- Knud Knudsen, photographer (d.1915)
- Bernt Julius Muus, Lutheran minister (d.1900)

== Deaths ==
- 28 January - Carsten Tank, politician (b.1766)
- 3 November - Gabriel Lund, merchant and representative at the Norwegian Constituent Assembly (b.1773)
