= Franz (given name) =

- Pronunciation: German: [fʁants]
- Gender: Masculine
- Language: German
- Name day: January 24; April 2 September 8 December 3

Origin
- Languages: 1. Latin; 2. German
- Origin: 1. Franciscus; 2. Franziskus
- Region of origin: German-speaking countries

Other names
- Cognate: Francis
- Related names: Ferenc, Francisco, François, Frans, František, Frantz
- See also: Frantz (given name); Franz (surname)
- Popularity: see popular names

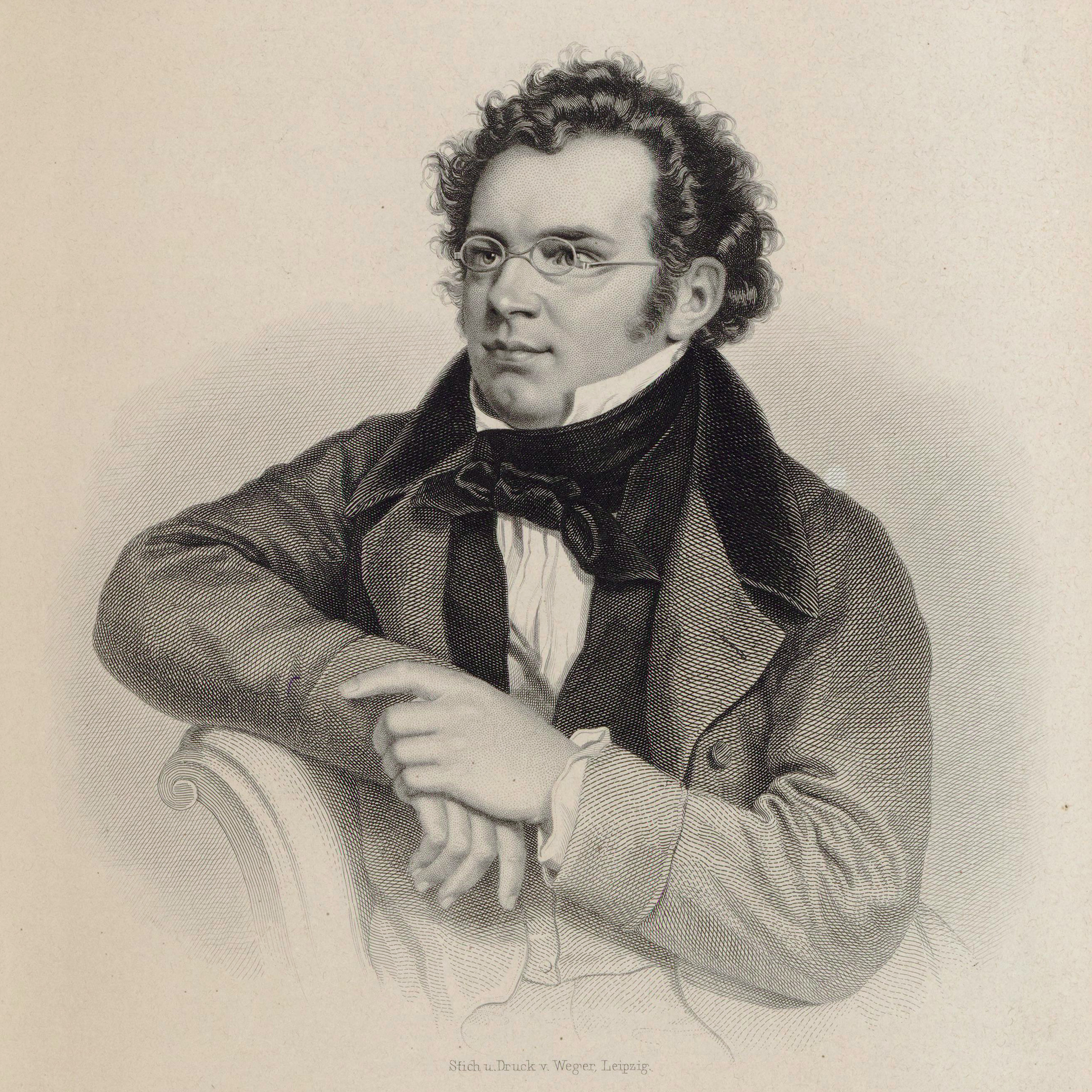
Franz Schubert

Franz is a German name and cognate of the given name Francis. Notable people named Franz include:

== Nobility ==
=== Austria-Hungary ===
- Francis I, Holy Roman Emperor (1708–1765)
- Francis II, Holy Roman Emperor (1768–1835), founder of the Austrian Empire
- Franz Joseph I (1830–1916), Austrian Emperor
- Franz Ferdinand, Archduke of Austria (1863–1914), heir to the thrones of Austria-Hungary, whose assassination in 1914 sparked World War I
- Franz Karl, Archduke of Austria (1802–1878), father of two emperors
- Franz Salvator, Archduke of Austria (1866–1939), Tuscan branch of the House of Habsburg
- Franz, Duke of Hohenberg (1927–1977), head of the House of Hohenburg
- Franz, Prince of Kohary (1760–1826), Imperial Chancellor
- Franz, Prince of Thun and Hohenstein (1847–1916), Governor of Bohemia
- Franz, Count of Deym (1838–1903), diplomat
- Franz, Count of Meran (1839–1891), Austrian Count
- Franz, Count of Gyulai (1798–1868), Governor of Lombardy-Venetia
- Franz, Count Széchényi (1754–1820), Hungarian Count
- Franz Anton von Kolowrat-Liebsteinsky (1778–1861), statesman from Prague
- Franz Conrad von Hötzendorf (1852–1925), Chief of the General Staff
- Franz Moritz von Lacy (1725–1801), Field Marshal
- Count Franz Philipp von Lamberg (1791–1848), soldier and statesman

=== Germany ===
- Franz, Duke of Bavaria (born 1933), head of the House of Wittelsbach
- Franz, Duke of Saxe-Coburg-Saalfeld (1750–1806), member of the House of Wettin
- Prince Franz of Bavaria (1875–1957), member of the House of Wittelsbach
- Prince Franz-Josef of Bavaria (1957–2022), member of the House of Wittelsbach
- Prince Franz Joseph of Thurn and Taxis (1893–1971), head of the House of Thurn and Taxis
- Prince Franz Wilhelm of Prussia (born 1943), member of the House of Hohenzollern
- Prince Franz Joseph of Battenberg (1861–1924), member of the House of Hesse
- Franz, Count of Erbach-Erbach (1754–1823), nobleman and art collector
- Franz von Waldeck (1491–1553), Prince-Bishop of Münster

=== Liechtenstein ===
- Franz I, Prince of Liechtenstein (1853–1938), sovereign of Liechtenstein
- Franz Joseph I, Prince of Liechtenstein (1726–1781), sovereign of Liechtenstein
- Franz Joseph II, Prince of Liechtenstein (1906–1989), sovereign of Liechtenstein

== Other people ==
=== A ===
- Franz Abt (1819–1885), German composer and Kapellmeister
- Franz Ackermann (born 1963), German painter and installation artist
- Franz Adam (1815–1886), German painter of military subjects
- Franz Alt (mathematician) (1910–2011), Austrian-born American mathematician and computer scientist

=== B ===
- Franz Anton Basch (1901–1946), Nazi executed for war crimes
- Franz Bauer (1748–1840), Austrian microscopist and botanist
- Franz Bauer (sculptor) (1798–1872), Austrian sculptor
- Franz Beckenbauer (1945–2024), German football player and manager
- Franz Behr (1837–1898), German composer
- Franz Benda (1709–1786), Czech violinist and composer
- Franz Berwald (1796–1868), Swedish composer
- Franz Beyer (general) (1892–1968), German General in World War II
- Franz Beyer (musicologist) (1922–2018), German musicologist
- Franz Beyer (pilot) (1918–1944), German fighter pilot
- Franz Binder (1911–1989), Austrian football player and coach
- Franz Boas (1858–1942), German-American anthropologist considered the "father of American anthropology"
- Franz Boos (1753–1832), Austrian botanist and explorer during the Enlightenment
- Franz Bopp (1791–1867), German linguist
- Franz Böhm, (born 1999), a BAFTA-winning British-German film director and producer
- Franz Brunner (handballer) (1913–1991), Austrian handball player who competed in the 1936 Summer Olympics
- Franz Burda I (1903–1986), German publisher
- Franz Büchner (pathologist) (1895–1991), German pathologist
- Franz Bürkl, Gestapo officer in Nazi-occupied Poland, assassinated in Operation Bürkl

=== C ===
- Franz Calustro (born 1974), Bolivian football player

=== D ===
- Franz Defregger (1835–1921), Austrian painter
- Franz Josef Degenhardt (1931–2011), German poet, novelist and singer-songwriter
- Franz de Liagre Böhl (1882–1976), Austrian-born Dutch assyriologist
- Franz-Benno Delonge (1957–2007), designer of German-style board games
- Franz von Dingelstedt (1814–1881), German poet, dramatist, theatre administrator

=== E ===
- Franz Engel (1834–1920), German explorer

=== F ===
- Franz Joseph Feuchtmayer (1660–1718), German artist, patriarch of the Feuchtmayer family
- Franz Xaver Feuchtmayer the Elder (1698–1763), German Baroque artist and plasterer
- Franz Xaver Feuchtmayer the Younger (1735–1803), German Baroque artist and plasterer
- Franz Fuchs (1949–2000), Austrian terrorist

=== G ===
- Franz Xaver Gebel (1787–1843), German musician
- Franz Grillparzer (1791–1872), Austrian writer and poet

=== H ===
- Franz Halberg (1919–2013), one of the founders of chronobiology
- Franz Hein (1892–1976), German chemist
- Franz Herre (1926–2026), German journalist and biographer
- Franz von Hipper (1863–1932), German World War I admiral, commander of the High Seas Fleet
- Franz Hofmeister (1850–1922), German protein scientist
- Franz Hössler (1906–1945), Nazi officer at Auschwitz executed for war crimes
- Franz Joseph Haydn (1732–1809), Austrian composer. He did not himself use the name "Franz"; for discussion see Haydn's name.

=== J ===
- Franz Jägerstätter (1907–1943), Austrian conscientious objector during World War II
- Franz Jantscher (born 1969), Austrian politician
- Franz Josef Jung (born 1949), German politician

=== K ===
- Franz Kafka (1883–1924), Bohemian novelist
- Franz Kindermann, German merchant
- Franz Klammer (born 1953), champion Austrian alpine ski racer
- Franz Kleffner (1907–1945), SS officer in World War II
- Franz Kline (1910–1962), American abstract painter
- Franz Konrad (SS officer) (1906–1952), German SS officer executed for war crimes
- Franz König (1905–2004), Austrian Cardinal of the Catholic Church
- Franz Kreisel (1890–1960), German ice hockey player

=== L ===
- Franz Lachner (1803–1890), German composer and conductor
- Franz Langoth (1877–1953), Austrian nationalist politician
- Franz Lehár (1870–1948), Austrian composer
- Franz Lidz (born 1951), American writer and journalist
- Franz Liszt (1811–1886), Hungarian composer and piano virtuoso

=== M ===
- Franz Machon (1918–1968), German sailor in World War II and sole survivor of U-512
- Franz Marc (1880–1916), principal painter of the German Expressionist movement
- Franz Marek (1913–1979), Austrian communist politician
- Franz Erdmann Mehring (1846–1919), German publicist, politician and historian
- Franz Muhri (1924–2001), Austrian communist politician
- Franz Müntefering (born 1940), German politician and industrialist

=== N ===
- Franz Nachbaur (1835–1902), German opera tenor
- Franz Xaver Nachtmann (1799–1846), German painter

=== O ===
- Franz Oppenheim (1852–1929), German chemist and industrialist

=== P ===
- Franz von Papen (1879–1969), Chancellor of Germany in the Weimar Republic

=== R ===
- Franz Rademacher (1906–1973), Nazi diplomat and author of the Madagascar Plan
- Franz Reichelt (1878-1912), Austro-Hungarian French tailor, inventor and parachuting pioneer
- Franz Reichleitner (1906–1944), Austrian Nazi SS concentration camp commander
- Franz Rosenzweig (1886–1929), German-Jewish theologian and philosopher

=== S ===
- Franz Schafheitlin (1895–1980), German film actor
- Franz Schalk (1863–1931), Austrian conductor and founder of the Salzburg Music Festival
- Franz Schall (1918–1945), German World War II fighter ace
- Franz Schieß (1921–1943), German World War II fighter ace
- Franz Scholz (1909–1998), German priest and theologian
- Franz von Paula Schrank (1747–1835), German botanist and entomologist
- Franz Schubert (1797–1828), Austrian composer
- Franz Heinrich Schwechten (1841–1924), German architect
- Franz Schwede (1888–1960), Nazi Gaulieter of Pomerania
- Franz Schädle (1906–1945), commander of Adolf Hitler's personal bodyguard
- Franz Wilhelm Seiwert (1894–1933), German constructivist painter and sculptor
- Franz Joseph Spiegler (1691–1757), German Baroque painter
- Franz Stangl (1908–1971), Austrian-born Nazi SS concentration camp commandant
- Franz Stofel (1915–1945), German Nazi concentration camp commander executed for war crimes
- Franz Josef Strauss (1915–1988), German politician
- Franz von Suppé (1819–1895), Austrian composer
- Franz Xaver Süssmayr (1766–1803), Austrian composer

=== T ===
- Franz Taurinus (1794–1874), German mathematician
- Franz Thonner (1863–1928), Austrian taxonomist and botanist
- Franz Treichler (born 1961), Swiss rock musician and singer of The Young Gods

=== U ===
- Franz Unger (1800–1870), Austrian botanist, paleontologist and plant physiologist

=== V ===
- Franz Vranitzky (born 1937), Austrian politician

=== W ===
- Franz Werfel, (1890–1945), Austrian-Bohemian novelist, playwright and poet

=== Z ===
- Franz Ziereis (1905–1945), German Nazi SS concentration camp commandant

== Fictional characters ==
- Hans and Franz, characters of the television show Saturday Night Live
- Franz Bibfeldt, fictitious theologian and in-joke among American academic theologian
- Franz Heinel, character in the Japanese anime series Future GPX Cyber Formula
- Franz Hopper, character from the French-produced animated series Code Lyoko
- Franz Kemmerich, character in the war novel All Quiet on the Western Front
- Franz Liebkind, character in The Producers
- Franz Sanchez, character in the 1989 James Bond film Licence to Kill'

== See also ==
- Frans (disambiguation)
- Franz (disambiguation)
- Frantz (disambiguation)
- Franz Ferdinand (disambiguation)
