= Batuque (Brazil) =

Afro-Brazilian drumming ceremonies

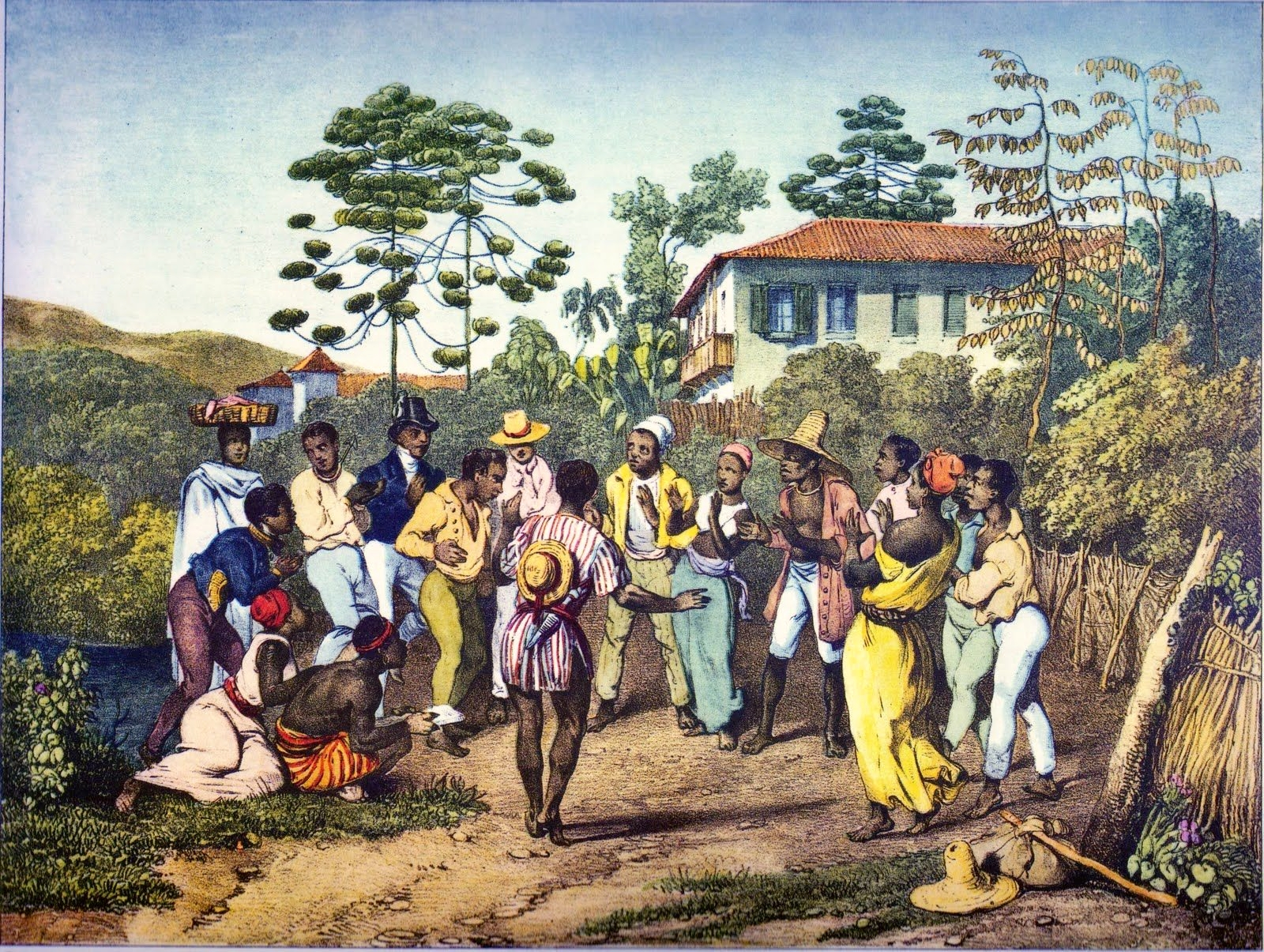
Batuque by Johann Moritz Rugendas, between 1822 and 1825.

Batuque (drumming) was a general term for various Afro-Brazilian practices in the 19th century, including music, dance, combat game and religion.

Batuques, or drumming ceremonies were an important cultural activity among the African population. These performance circles were a regular occurrence on Sunday evenings and holidays, drawing large crowds of enslaved Africans. Laws introduced in 1822 allowed police to shut down batuques. Despite the police repression, the batuques persisted covertly at the town's outskirts or along the shoreline.

Africans devised tactics to safeguard the batuques. They would scatter when the police approached and reconvene elsewhere to resume. In some cases, they responded to police repression with violence.

Within the batuques gatherings, there were specific groups dedicated to a combat game known as pernada in Rio and batuque or batuque-boi in Salvador.

In Bahia, the batuque dance evolved into various forms of samba, while the combat game was gradually absorbed by the capoeira. In the province of Rio Grande, batuque became the general term for Afro-Brazilian religion.

== As a dance ==
Batuque was a common dance among Africans in Brazil during the 19th century. In 1802, Luís dos Santos Vilhena, a teacher in Salvador, complained on the slaves performing batuques:

It does not seem very prudent, politically speaking, to tolerate crowds of negroes of both sexes performing their barbarous batuques through the city streets and squares to the beat of many horrible atabaques, indecently dancing to pagan songs, speaking various languages, and all with such frightful and discordant clamor as to cause fear and astonishment.

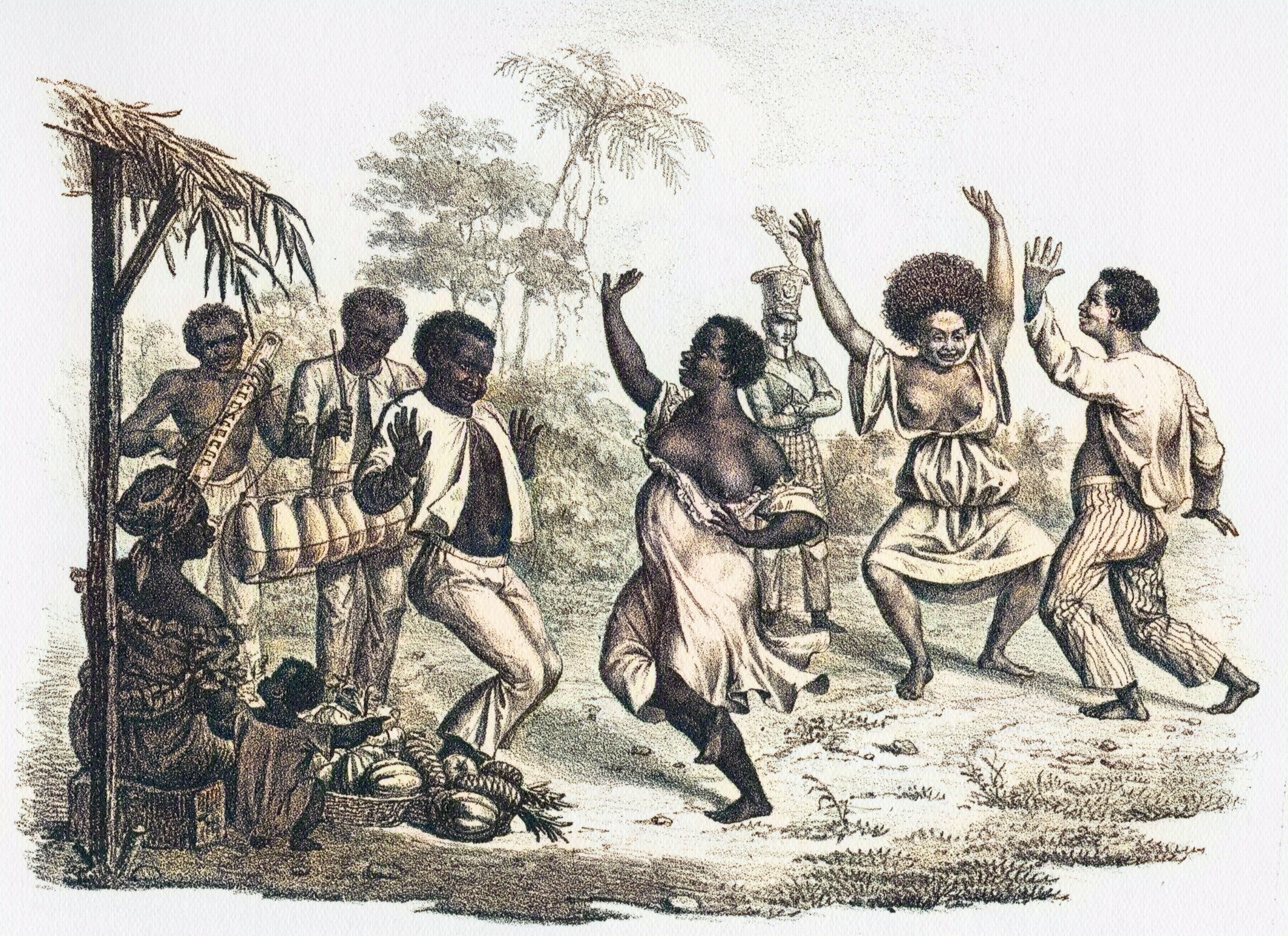
Batuque in São Paulo, by Nachtmann, Spix and Martius, 1820s

Many zungu houses in 19th century Rio often organized communal dances or batuques, where Africans organized themselves into distinct groups or nations to perform together. In the Rio suburbs, these dances drew up to two thousand Africans who danced in separate circles based on their nations. These nations had distinct dances, but they came together for common dances, including batuque, lundu, and capoeira.

In 1859, the French journalist Charles Ribeyrolls visiting Brazil described the Afro-Brazilian dances he saw:

Here, Capoeira is a type of war dance, accompanied by the powerful, militant rhythm of the Congo drum. Then there is the Batuque with its sensual movements, with the Urucungo intensifying or slowing down the rhythm. Further on, I see another wild dance, with provocative eyes, swaying waists, and agile thighs. This captivating undulation is known as Lundu.

The practice of these dances continued throughout the 19th century. Adèle Toussaint-Samson, a Parisian in Brazil, wrote in 1891:

In spite of all this, however, they [batuques] take place. At the risk of being cruelly beaten, the Negroes go on at night, when the whites are asleep, to dance on the beach in the moonlight. They assemble in groups of the same nationality, either Congo or Mozambique, or Minas; then, in dancing they forget their ills and servitude, and only remember their native country and the time that they were free.

— Adèle Toussaint-Samson

Spix and Martius' reported that by the end of the colonial period, not only improvised songs but also the emerging Brazilian modinhas were already being sung at batuques.

== As a combat game ==
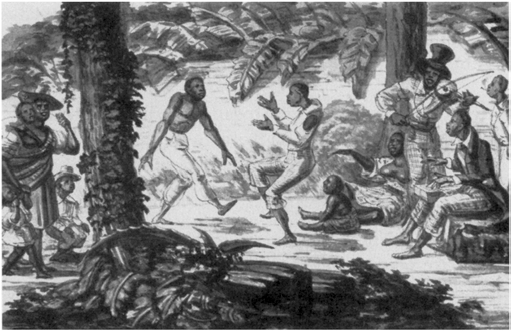
Harro Harring, Negro dance

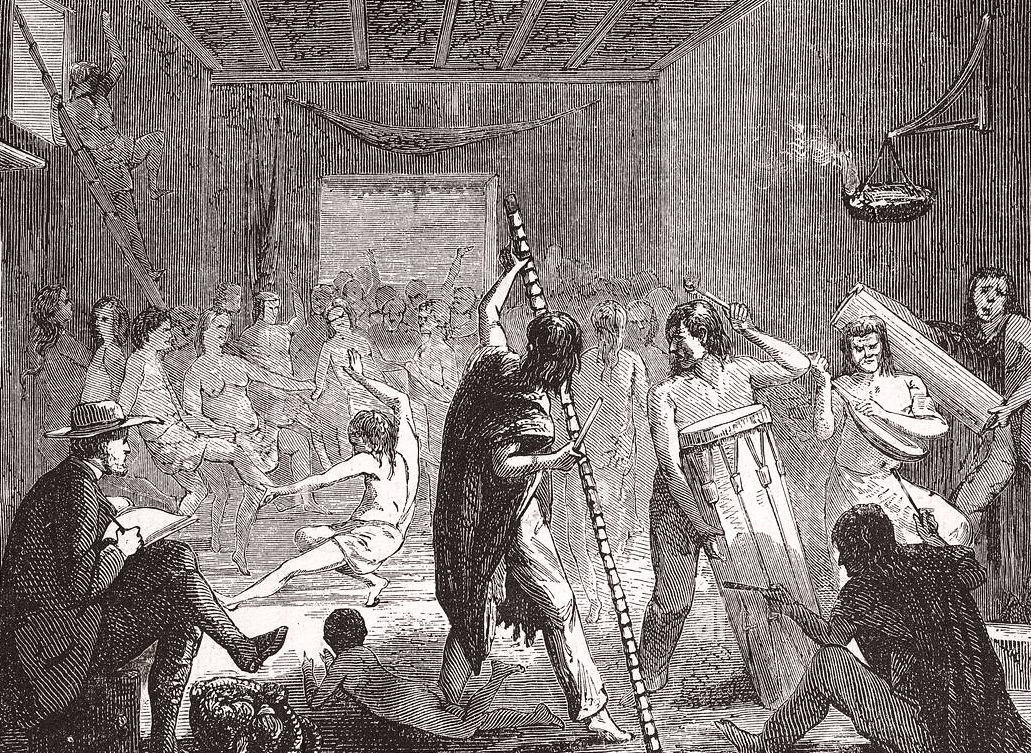
Batuque in Nueva Granada, by Alexis de Gabriac (1868)

Batuque was a wrestling-like game played in Bahia in the early part of the twentieth century by African slaves, but now extinct. A similar game, pernada, was popular in Rio de Janeiro about the same time.

In this game, two players stand in a circle. The defender stands in the center in a defensive position, with inward-rotated legs to protect his genitals and root himself. The attacker, often after feinting, made one decisive attempt to knock down the defender with his hips, upper legs, or feet. If the defender fell, a new player took their place; if not, they became the attacker, and the game continued. A range of techniques was used in batuque to unbalance the opponent: rapa, baú, banda lisa, encruzilhada.

Edison Carneiro wrote that it was played to the berimbau, tambourine, scraper, and singing.

Batuque was a combat game of predominantly Angolan origins. In the 1930s the Angolans in Brazil were the champions in batuque, with one of the most renowned practitioners being Angolinha (little Angola).

Many capoeiras also practiced batuque. Capoeira innovators like Anibal Burlamaqui in Rio and Mestre Bimba, the founder of the regional style, incorporated numerous batuque techniques. Moreover, Mestre Bimba's father was a champion of batuque. Mestre Tiburcinho was a big batuqueiro and one of the last ones to preserve this art. Nestor Capoeira believes that many rasteiras introduced by Bimba came from batuque.

=== Batuque in present ===
There are efforts to resurrect Batuque (and leg wrestling in general) as a modern sport.

== As a religion ==
Batuque is an old name for Candomblé religion.

Today, batuque is an Afro-Brazilian religion, practiced mainly in Brazil. The Batuque pantheon includes spirits rather than gods, who are mostly thought to come in two types: Catholic Saints and encantados (anthropomorphic spirits who "inhabit the tangible world" and mostly come from Brazil, although there are foreigners in their rank). "Spirit possession and mediumship are...integral to Batuque worship."

== See also ==
- Capoeira

== Literature ==
- Johnson, Paul Christopher (2002). Secrets, Gossip, and Gods: The Transformation of Brazilian Candomblé. Oxford and New York: Oxford University Press. ISBN 9780195150582.
- Assunção, Matthias Röhrig (2002). Capoeira: The History of an Afro-Brazilian Martial Art. Routledge. ISBN 978-0-7146-8086-6.
- Capoeira, Nestor (2002). Capoeira: Roots of the Dance-Fight-Game. Blue Snake Books. ISBN 978-1-58394-637-4.
- Talmon-Chvaicer, Maya (2008). The Hidden History of Capoeira: A Collision of Cultures in the Brazilian Battle Dance. University of Texas Press. ISBN 978-0-292-71723-7.
- Desch-Obi, M. Thomas J. (2008). Fighting for Honor: The History of African Martial Art Traditions in the Atlantic World. Columbia: University of South Carolina Press. ISBN 978-1-57003-718-4.
