= Christian Franzen =

Christian Franzen may refer to:

- Christian Franzen (photographer) (1864–1923), Danish photographer and diplomat based in Spain
- Christian Franzen (businessman) (1845–1920), American politician, farmer, and businessman

== See also ==
- Franzen
