= Vitko =

Vitko is a surname. Notable people with the surname include:

- Aleksandr Vitko (born 1961), Russian naval officer
- Frantz Vitko, Belarusian trade unionist
- Joe Vitko (born 1970), American baseball player
- Marián Vitko (born 1994), Slovak volleyball player
- Róbert Vitko (born 1997), Slovak Data Engineer
