= Andrei Belyakov =

Belarusian politician (born 1976)

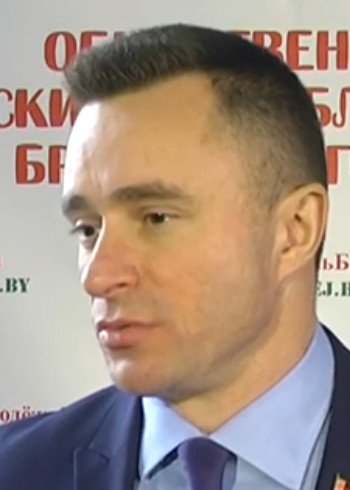
- Belyakov in 2017

First Secretary of the Belarusian Republican Youth Union
- In office 20 January 2015 – 30 May 2018
- Preceded by: Igor Buzovsky
- Succeeded by: Dmitry Voronyuk

Personal details
- Born: 17 July 1976 (age 49)

Andrei Eduardovich Belyakov (Russian: Андрэй Эдуардович Беляков; born 17 July 1976) is a Belarusian politician. From 2015 to 2018, he served as first secretary of the Belarusian Republican Youth Union. From 2016 to 2019, he was a member of the Council of the Republic.
