= Dingelstedt =

Dingelstedt may refer to:-

== People ==
- Franz von Dingelstedt

== Places ==
- Dingelstedt in Saxony-Anhalt
