= Frantz =

Frantz may refer to:

- Frantz (given name), a masculine given name (and list of people with the given name)
- Frantz (surname), a surname (and list of people with the surname)
- Frantz (Coppélia), a character in Coppélia
- Frantz (film), a 2016 French film
- The Frantz Manufacturing Company, a manufacturer of conveyor systems

== See also ==
- D. E. Frantz House, a historic building in Aspen, Colorado
- Frans (disambiguation)
- Franz (disambiguation)
- Frantzen (disambiguation)
