= Mikhail Orda =

Belarusian politician (born 1966)

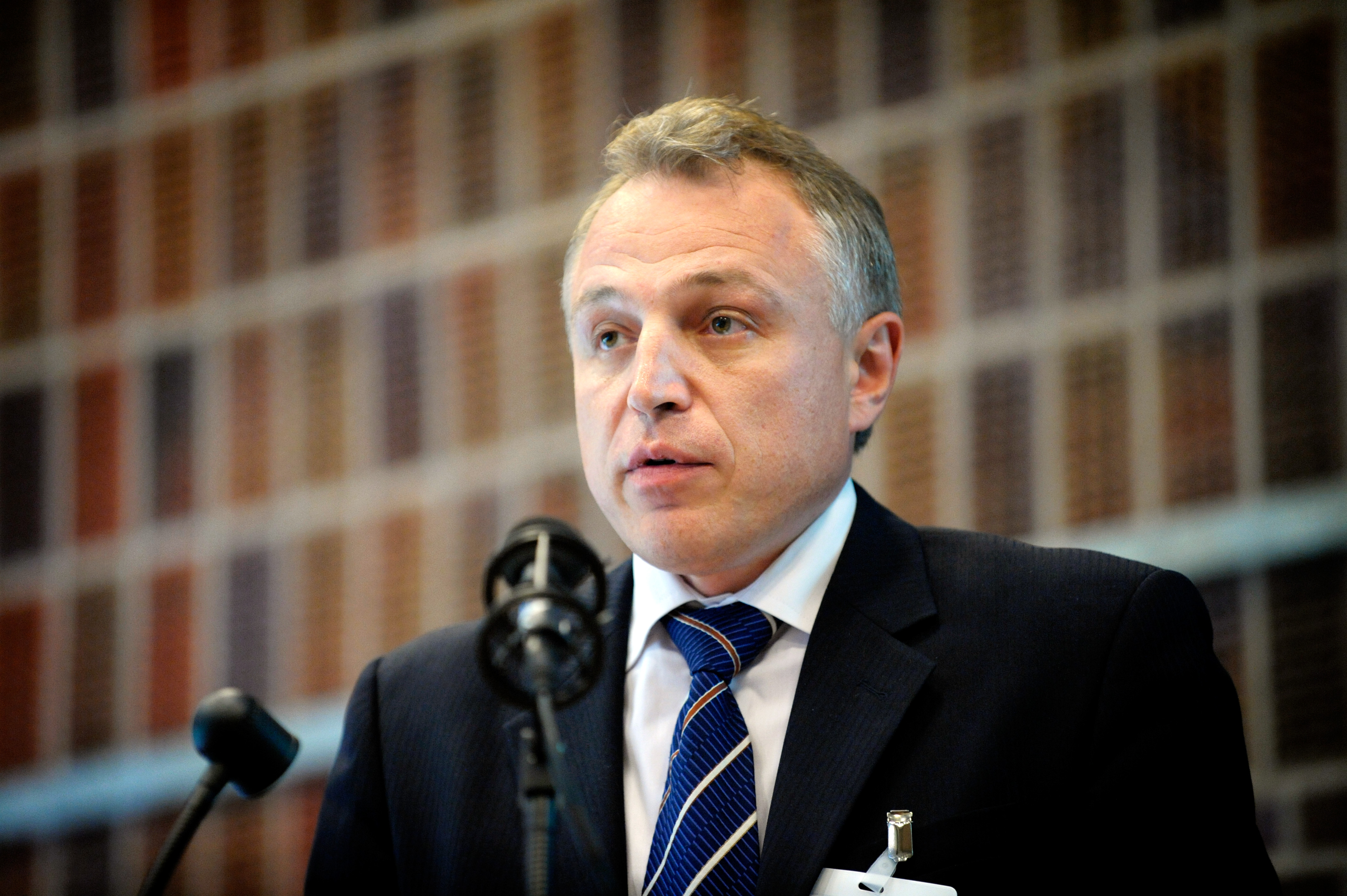
- Orda in 2009

Chairman of the Federation of Trade Unions
- In office 25 September 2014 – 5 April 2024
- Preceded by: Leonid Kozik
- Succeeded by: Yuri Senko

Personal details
- Born: 28 September 1966 (age 59)

Mikhail Sergeyevich Orda (Russian: Михаил Сергеевич Орда; born 28 September 1966) is a Belarusian trade unionist and politician. He has been a member of the House of Representatives since 2024, having previously served from 2000 to 2012. From 2014 to 2024, he served as chairman of the Federation of Trade Unions. From 2016 to 2019, he was a member of the Council of the Republic. From 2003 to 2006, he served as first secretary of the Belarusian Republican Youth Union.
