= Friedrich Gustav Triesch =

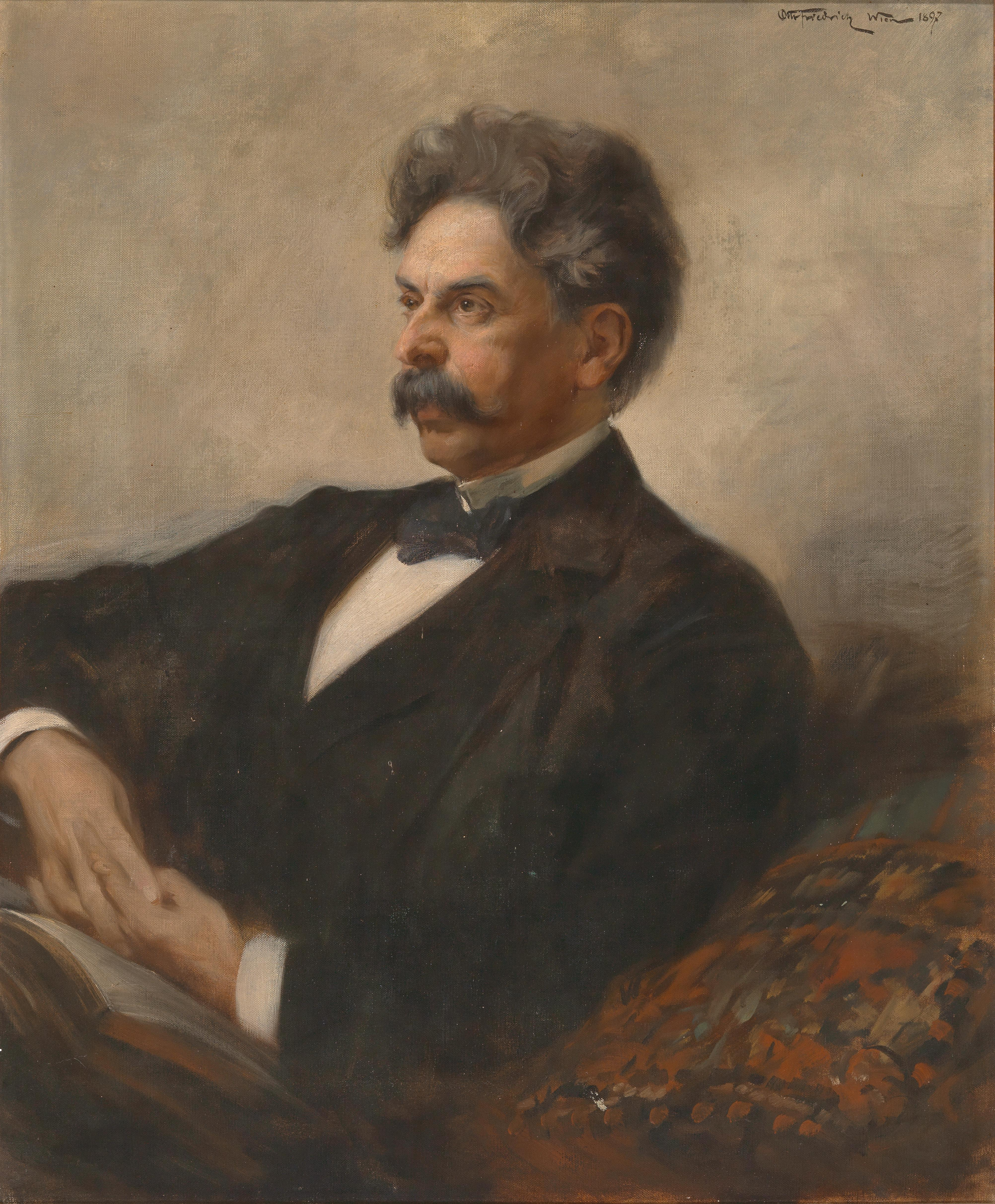
- Born: 16 June 1845; Vienna, Austrian Empire
- Died: 24 May 1907 (aged 61)
- Occupation: Dramatist
- Writing career
- Pen name: Alex Hartmann; Paul Richter; H. Martin
- Language: German

Friedrich Gustav Triesch (16 June 1845 – 24 May 1907) was an Austrian dramatist.

== Biography ==
Friedrich Gustav Triesch was born into a Jewish family in Vienna in 1845, where his father worked as a goldsmith. He began to write plays as a child, which he performed at a puppet theatre.

Triesch studied sculpture at the Akademie der bildenden Künste Wien before shifting his focus to literature. Financial constraints forced him into a career in commerce for a period, but the success of his second play, the farce Lachende Erben (1867), allowed him to pursue playwriting full-time.

In 1868, Triesch received honorable mention for his four-act comedy Im XIX. Jahrhundert in the Hofburgtheater's prize competition, which received over a thousand submissions. In 1877, two of his plays, Höhere Gesichtspunkte and Die Wochenchronik, were similarly honoured. Triesch's comedy Neue Verträg won the first prize at the Munich Hoftheater in 1879, and his drama Ottilie took first prize in a competition organized by the Litterarisches Vermittlungsbureau of Hamburg in 1892.

== Work ==
Triesch authored numerous poems and short stories, as well as the following plays:

- Amalie Welden (comedy). 1865.
- Lachende Erben (farce). 1867.
- Im XIX. Jahrhundert (comedy). 1868.
- Mädchenherzen (drama). 1873.
- Triesch, Friedrich Gustav (1873). Träume sind Schäume (comedy).
- Triesch, Friedrich Gustav (1876). Aus Vorsicht (comedy).
- Höhere Gesichtspunkte. 1877.
- Die Wochenchronik. 1877.
- Triesch, Friedrich Gustav (1877). Reine Liebe (comedy). Adapted from a Dingelstedt novella.
- Triesch, Friedrich Gustav (1879). Neue Verträg (comedy).
- Anwalt (drama). 1881.
- Triesch, Friedrich Gustav (1884). Der Hexenmeister (comedy).
- Nixe (comedy). 1887.
- Hand in Hand. 1890.
- Ottilie (drama). 1879.
- Factotum Flitsch (farce). 1892.
- Liquidator (farce). 1896.
- Ihr System (farce). 1898.
- Endlich Allein (comedy). 1900.
