= Franz Ferdinand (disambiguation) =

Archduke Franz Ferdinand was the heir to the Austro-Hungarian throne whose assassination precipitated World War I.

Franz Ferdinand may also refer to:

- Franz Ferdinand (band), a Scottish rock music group
  - Franz Ferdinand (album), their debut album
  - Franz Ferdinand (DVD)
- SMS Erzherzog Franz Ferdinand, a warship named after the archduke
- Franz Ferdinand, a character from the Alfred J. Kwak cartoon series
- Franz Ferdinand von Rummel, Prince-Bishop of Vienna and tutor of Joseph I
- Franz Ferdinand Richter, German Baroque painter
- Franz Ferdinand Benary, 19th century German orientalist and exegete
- Franz Ferdinand Schulze, 19th century German chemist and microbiologist
- Franz Ferdinand Heymann, British physicist and professor

== See also ==
- Frans Blom, a Danish explorer and archaeologist, also known as Frants Ferdinand Blom
- Franz von Dingelstedt, a German poet, also known as Franz Ferdinand, Freiherr von Dingelstedt
- Franc Fernandez, an Argentinian fashion designer
