= Kaiser Franz =

Kaiser is the German word for "emperor". Franz is a German name and cognate of "Francis".

Kaiser Franz may refer to:

== Monarchs ==
- Franz I (1708–1765), Holy Roman Emperor
- Franz II (1768–1835), Holy Roman Emperor, founder of the Austrian Empire
- Franz Joseph I (1830–1916), Austrian Emperor

== Others ==
- Franz Beckenbauer (1945-2024), former German football player and manager
- Franz Klammer (* 1953), former Austrian ski racer
