= Dmitry Voronyuk =

Belarusian politician (born 1987)

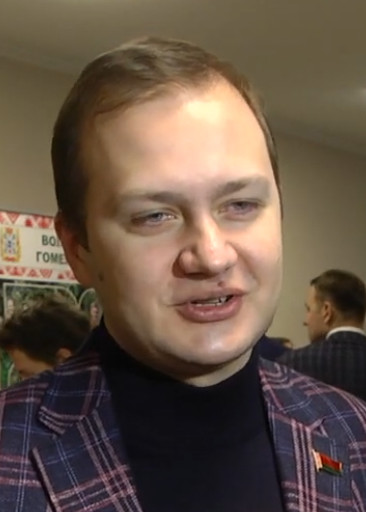
- Voronyuk in 2020

First Secretary of the Belarusian Republican Youth Union
- In office 30 May 2018 – 13 August 2021
- Preceded by: Andrei Belyakov
- Succeeded by: Alexander Lukyanov

Personal details
- Born: 23 May 1987 (age 38)

Dmitry Sergeevich Voronyuk (Russian: Дмитрий Сергеевич Воронюк; born 23 May 1987) is a Belarusian politician. From 2018 to 2021, he served as first secretary of the Belarusian Republican Youth Union. From 2019 to 2024, he was a member of the Council of the Republic.
