= Cornelis Ruhtenberg =

German-American painter

- Born: November 18, 1923; Riga, Latvia
- Died: 2008 (aged 84–85); Issaquah, Washington, U.S.
- Occupation: Painter
- Father: Jan Ruhtenberg

Cornelis Ruhtenberg (November 18, 1923 - 2008) was a Latvian-American painter.

== Life ==
Ruhtenberg was born in Riga, Latvia to Hanne Helmsing Ruhtenberg, and Jan Ruhtenberg. She and her two brothers grew up in Latvia, Germany, and Sweden, with the family moving to Berlin in the late 1920s after Jan received a scholarship to Berliner Technische Hochschule. Her parents divorced in 1931, and Ruhtenberg chose to stay with her mother in Berlin while her father moved to Sweden to work. She studied at the Hochschule für Bildende Kunst in Berlin between 1941 and 1946, during which time she lived with her mother. In 1942, her senior year of high school, she broke both arms in a gymnastics accident and was thus able to avoid joining Nazi youth labor groups; by the time she had recovered, the government was more focused on the war than bureaucracy, and didn't follow up with her. She maintained a low profile for the remainder of the war, despite being an associate of Karl Hofer and Max Kaus, and was not attacked by the Nazi party. While laying low, she focused on her painting. After the war ended, she would scavenge plywood from demolished buildings to paint on. Around the same time, she was named one of Germany's 25 greatest living painters by the Prolog group, and one of only four women on the list.

She immigrated to the United States in April or May 1948, where she reunited with her father, who had lived in the country since 1932. In May of that year, she exhibited 15 paintings at the Colorado Springs Fine Arts Center. Other artists from the center said there was "no explanation for the astonishing talent she has developed under unimaginable conditions".

She lived in and exhibited her art in New York City before moving to Iowa with her husband, Jules Kirschenbaum, whom she had met in 1952 and who taught at Drake University. In 1954, one of her paintings was acquired by the Museum of Fine Arts, Boston. She exhibited art at the Museum of Modern Art three times: in 1955, 1956, and 1962. In 1957 she illustrated a children's book, Straps the Cat, which was written by Claudia Lewis.

Ruhtenberg died in Issaquah, Washington in 2008.

== Style ==
Ruhtenberg primarily painted figures who were "caught in their own contemplative worlds", and who were more loosely and abstracted painted compared to the environments they were set in. She favored muted colors in her works, and tended to paint fairly flat backgrounds.

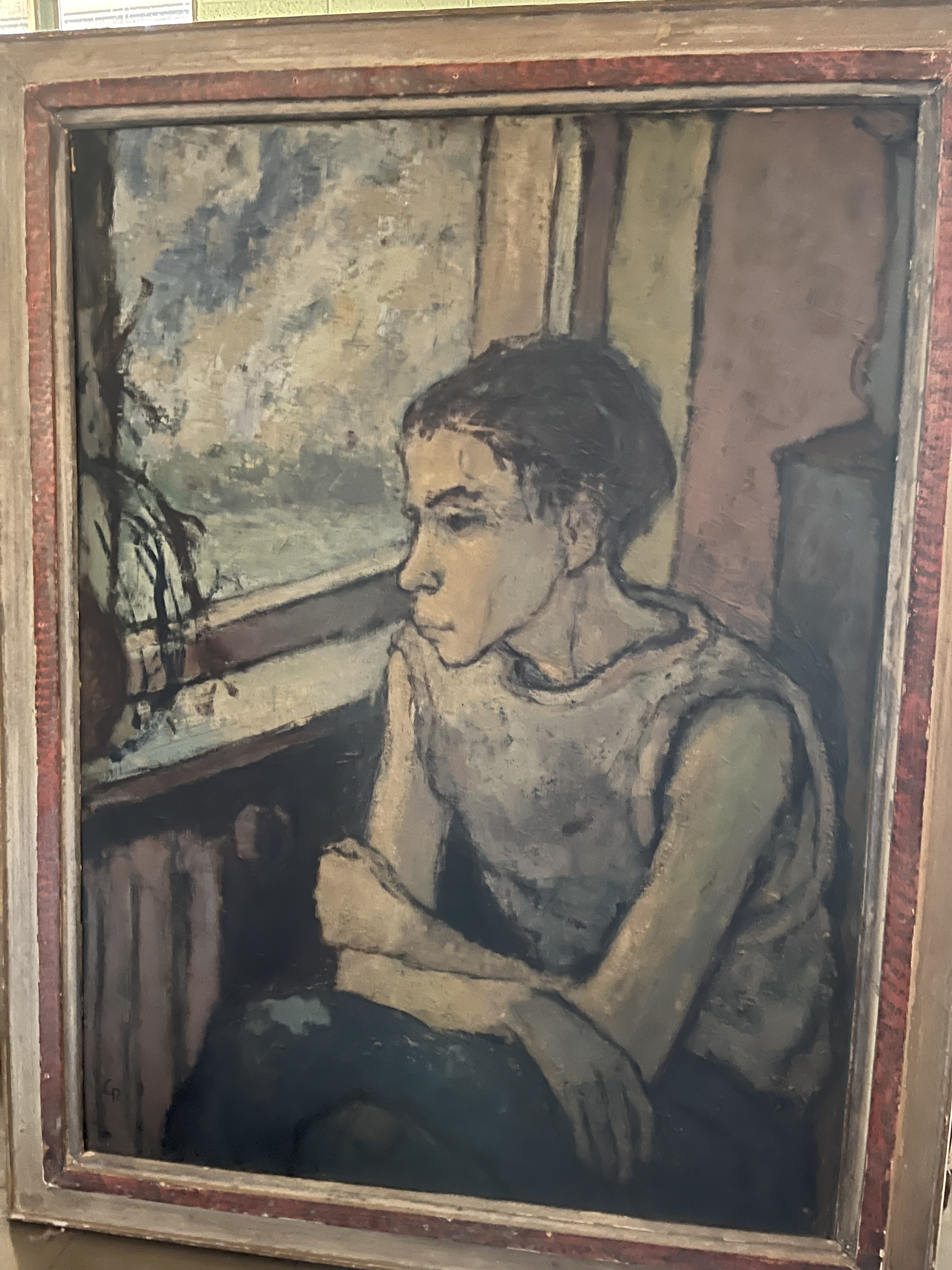
Junge am Fenster

== Works ==
Three of Ruhtenberg's works are housed at the Smithsonian American Art Museum.
