= Franz (surname) =

- Pronunciation: /frænz/ German pronunciation: [fʁants]
- Gender: Masculine
- Language: German

Origin
- Languages: 1. Latin; 2. German
- Origin: 1. Franciscus; 2. Franziskus
- Meaning: Frankish, Frenchman, free man

Other names
- Variant form: Frantz (surname)
- See also: Franz (given name)

Franz is a surname of German origin. Notable persons with this name include:

- Agnes Franz (1794–1843), German writer
- Anselm Franz (1900–1994), Austrian engineer
- Arthur Franz (1920–2006), American actor
- Dennis Franz (born 1944), American actor noted for NYPD Blue
- Eduard Franz (1902–1983), American actor
- Elizabeth Franz (born 1941), American actress
- Ellen Franz (1839–1923), German pianist and actress
- Friedrich Franz (1783–1860), Moravian physicist and mathematician
- Frederick William Franz (1893–1992), past president of the Jehovah's Witnesses
- Helmut Franz (1911–2002), German academic teacher and choral conductor
- Horst Franz (born 1940), German football manager
- John E. Franz (1929–2026), American organic chemist
- Johnny Franz (1922–1977), UK record producer
- Katherine Franz (born 1972), American chemist
- Kurt Franz (1914–1998), German Nazi SS commandant of Treblinka extermination camp
- Linda Franz, American politician
- Ludwig Franz (1922–1990), German politician
- Marie-Louise von Franz (1915–1998), Swiss Jungian psychologist and scholar
- Maik Franz (born 1981), German footballer
- Mike Frantz (born 1986), German footballer
- Nolan Franz, American football player
- Raymond Franz (1922–2010), former Jehovah's Witness
- Robert Franz (1815–1892), German composer
- Rod Franz (1925–1999), American football player
- Romeo Franz (born 1966), German musician and politician
- Ron Franz (1945-2022), American professional basketball player
- Walter Franz (1911–1992), German theoretical physicist
- Wilhelm Franz (1913–1971), German audio engineer
- Wolfgang Franz (economist) (born 1944), German economist
- Wolfgang Franz (mathematician) (1905–1996), German mathematician
