= Frantz Vitko =

Belarusian trade unionist

Frantz Vitko (Russian: Ф.П. Витко) was the president of the Federation of Trade Unions of Belarus (FPB) 2001–02. Vitko, who had voiced criticism against the government, was persuaded to resign, and was replaced by Leonid Kozik.
