= Franz =

Franz may refer to:

== People ==
- Franz (given name)
- Franz (surname)

== Places ==
- Franz (crater), a lunar crater
- Franz, Ontario, a railway junction and unorganized town in Canada
- Franz Lake, in the state of Washington, United States – see Franz Lake National Wildlife Refuge

== Businesses ==
- Franz Deuticke, a scientific publishing company based in Vienna, Austria
- Franz Family Bakeries, a food processing company in Portland, Oregon
- Franz-porcelains, a Taiwanese brand of pottery based in San Francisco

== Other uses ==
- Franz (1971 film), a Belgian film
- Franz (2025 film), a biographical film about Franz Kafka
- Franz Lisp, a dialect of the Lisp programming language
- HAT-P-14, a star named Franz

== See also ==
- Frantz (disambiguation)
- Franzen (disambiguation)
- Frantzen (disambiguation)
