= Yuri Senko =

Belarusian politician (born 1967)

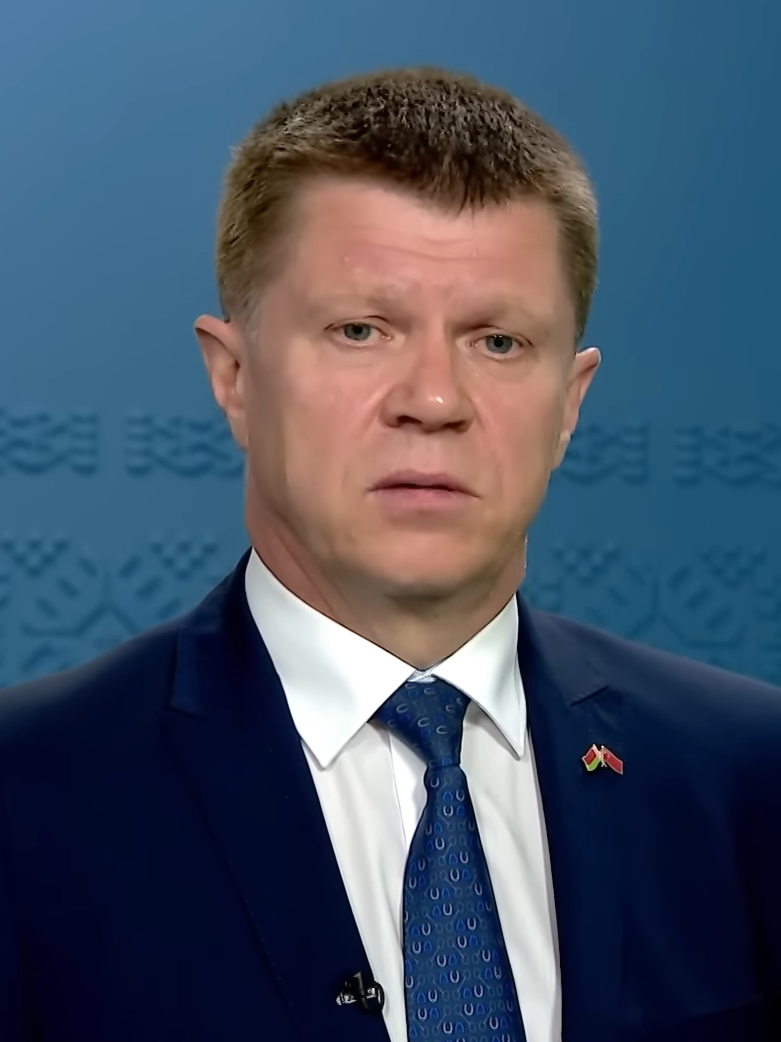
- Senko in 2022

Chairman of the Federation of Trade Unions
- Incumbent
- Assumed office 5 April 2024
- Preceded by: Mikhail Orda

Ambassador of Belarus to China
- In office 19 November 2020 – 20 November 2023
- President: Alexander Lukashenko
- Preceded by: Nikolai Snopkov
- Succeeded by: Aleksandr Chervyakov

Personal details
- Born: 1967 (age 58–59)

Yuri Alekseevich Senko (Russian: Юрий Алексеевич Сенько; born 1967) is a Belarusian politician, diplomat and trade unionist serving as chairman of the Federation of Trade Unions since 2024. From 2020 to 2023, he served as ambassador of Belarus to China. From 2014 to 2020, he served as chairman of the State Customs Committee of Belarus. He is the leader of the initiative group supporting the candidacy of Alexander Lukashenko for the 2025 presidential election.
