= Alexander Lukyanov =

Belarusian politician (born 1989)

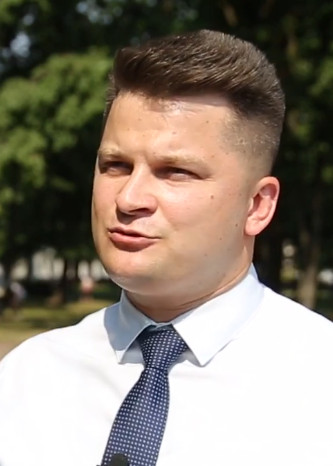
- Lukyanov in 2023

First Secretary of the Belarusian Republican Youth Union
- Incumbent
- Assumed office 13 August 2021
- Preceded by: Dmitry Voronyuk

Personal details
- Born: 10 June 1989 (age 36)
- Party: Belaya Rus

Alexander Sergeevich Lukyanov (Russian: Александр Сергеевич Лукьянов; born 10 June 1989) is a Belarusian politician serving as first secretary of the Belarusian Republican Youth Union since 2021. He has been a member of the Council of the Republic since 2024.
