= Frantz (surname) =

- Pronunciation: German: [fʁants]
- Gender: Masculine
- Language: German

Origin
- Language: Germanic
- Origin: Franciscus (Latin); Franziskus (German)
- Meaning: Frankish, Frenchman, free man

Other names
- Variant form: Franz (surname)
- Cognate: Francis (surname)

Frantz is a German surname, and may refer to:

- Adrienne Frantz (born 1978), American actress
- Albert T. Frantz (1903–1982), American justice from Colorado
- Alison Frantz (1903–1995), American archaeologist
- Art Frantz (1921–2008), American baseball umpire
- Chris Frantz (born 1951), American musician
- Dan Frantz (born 1977), American footballer
- Ferdinand Frantz (1906–1959), German singer
- Frank Frantz (1872–1941), American politician
- Harry W. Frantz (1891–1982), American newspaper editor
- Gotthard Frantz (1888–1973), German general during World War II
- Joseph Frantz (soldier) (1837–1913), soldier in the American Civil War
- Justus Frantz (born 1944), German pianist
- Marge Frantz (1922–2015), American activist and women's studies academic
- Mike Frantz (born 1986), German footballer
- Milane Frantz (born 1970), American billionaire heir
- Nicolas Frantz (1899–1985), Luxembourgian cyclist
- Paris Frantz, Miss Continental 1996
- Paul Frantz (1927–2016), French football manager
- Scott Frantz (born 1960), American politician and businessman from Connecticut
- Susan Frantz, American politician from Florida
- Tom Frantz (1943–2019), American race car driver
- Virginia Kneeland Frantz (1896–1967), American pathologist

== See also ==
- Franz (disambiguation)
- Franz (given name)
