= Polly King Ruhtenberg =

American author (1907–1983)

Polly King Ruhtenberg (May 18, 1907 – January 23, 1983) was an American children’s book author and libertarian.

Ruhtenberg grew up in Morristown, New Jersey, and went to the Shipley School in Pennsylvania and Barnard College in New York City.

She married her second husband, Alexander Gustav Jan Ruhtenberg on August 4, 1935. While in New York she helped organize the New York City Maternal Health Centres and served as its secretary. In 1940 the couple moved away from New York City to Colorado Springs, Colorado.

For a ten-year span, 1952–1962, Ruhtenberg served as the Colorado Coordinator for the Vigilante Women for the Bricker Amendment. During this time period she was also the joint-chairwoman of the Colorado Committee for the Liberty Amendment. While in Colorado she also served as a member of the National Society of Colonial Dames of America, the Colorado Springs Opera Association, and board member of the Pioneer Museum, and many other civic and social organizations.

She died January 23, 1983, in Colorado Springs, Colorado.

== Works ==
- Henry McAllister : Colorado pioneer
- The Clock in Broadmarket Square
- Divorce Yourself from Worthless Habits
- Gold Finding for the Weekender, G. A. Huggins, co-author
- Granma's Weather Signs
- Gunpowder
- Know Why I Want You for My Valentine, Sweetheart?
- The long-lost letter, Rosemary Hetzler, co-author
- The Marland Hounds (The Hounds of Marland Road)
- Nip or The Adventures of Nip, Karl T. Pflock, co-author. (Published, 1982)
- Only the White Mare Mourned
- Puppy Dog Tails
- Mrs. Tiggiewinkle
- Twinkle and Tinker
- Up the Down Elevator
