= Frantzen =

Frantzen or Frantzén is a surname. Notable people with the surname include:

- Allen Frantzen (born 1947/48), American medievalist
- Björn Frantzén (born 1977), Swedish chef and restaurateur
- Jean-Pierre Frantzen (1890–1957), Luxembourgish gymnast
- Jørgen Frantzen (1935–2020), Danish rower
- Tom Frantzen (born 1954), Belgian sculptor
- William Frantzen (born 1993), Norwegian footballer

== See also ==
- Franzen (disambiguation)
- Franz (disambiguation)
