= Jens Andersen Hagen =

Norwegian politician (1832–1906)

Jens Andersen Hagen (20 October 1832 – 21 February 1906) was a Norwegian politician for the Conservative Party.

Hagen was born in Haga in the parish of Romedal to farmer Anders Hagen and Anne Marie Hagen. He worked as a tanner Kristiania starting in 1858 and from 1895 owned a brick factory.

He was elected to the Norwegian Parliament in 1886, representing the constituency of Kristiania, Hønefoss og Kongsvinger. He only served one term.

He was a member of the municipal council for Kristiania Municipality from 1885-1894. He died in 1906 in Kristiania (now Oslo).
