= Peter Franzen =

British journalist

Peter Franzen is a retired English journalist, who was the editor of the Norwich-based regional newspaper the Eastern Daily Press, a position he occupied from 1993 until his retirement in 2009. He previously held roles including executive editor of that title and editor of the Great Yarmouth Mercury, having joined their publisher Archant in 1971.

He was appointed as an officer of the Order of the British Empire in the 2005 New Year Honours list.
