= Roger Franzén =

Swedish football player and manager

Personal information
- Full name: Hans Roger Franzén
- Date of birth: 17 July 1964 (age 62)
- Place of birth: Sweden
- Position: Midfielder

Team information
- Current team: Sweden U17

Youth career
- Huddinge IF

Senior career*
Years	Team	Apps	(Gls)
1970–1976	Wårby SK		
1977–1978	Djurgårdens IF		
1979–1994	Huddinge IF		

Managerial career
- 1994–2004: Huddinge IF
- 2005–2007: IF Brommapojkarna (assistant coach)
- 2008–2010: Hammarby Talang FF
- 2010–2011: Hammarby IF
- 2012: GIF Sundsvall (assistant coach)
- 2013–2016: GIF Sundsvall
- 2017–: Sweden U17
- * Club domestic league appearances and goals

Roger Franzén (born 17 July 1964) is a Swedish football manager and former player. Rikard Franzén is his brother.
