= Leonid Kozik =

Belarusian trade unionist (1948–2023)

Leonid Petrovich Kozik (Russian: Леонид Петрович Козик; Belarusian: Леанід Пятровіч Козік, Leanid Piatrovič Kozik; 13 July 1948 – 5 August 2023) was a Belarusian trade unionist who was president of the Federation of Trade Unions of Belarus (FPB). Kozik was elected FPB president in 2002. Prior to assuming the FPB position, Kozik had been Deputy Head of the Presidential Administration. After the election of Kozik, FPB began receiving state subsidies in 2003.

Kozik was a Deputy Prime Minister of Belarus from 4 February 1997 to 12 September 2001.

Leonid Kozik died on 5 August 2023, at the age of 75.
