= Nils Franzén =

Swedish politician

Nils Franzén (born 11 December 1910, died 1985) was a Swedish politician. He was a member of the Centre Party.
