= Harro Harring =

German-Danish revolutionary and writer (1798–1870)

Harro Paul Harring (28 August 1798 – 14 May 1870) was a German-Danish revolutionary and writer. Often identified as Danish, he was, more accurately, from North Frisia in the Duchy of Schleswig.

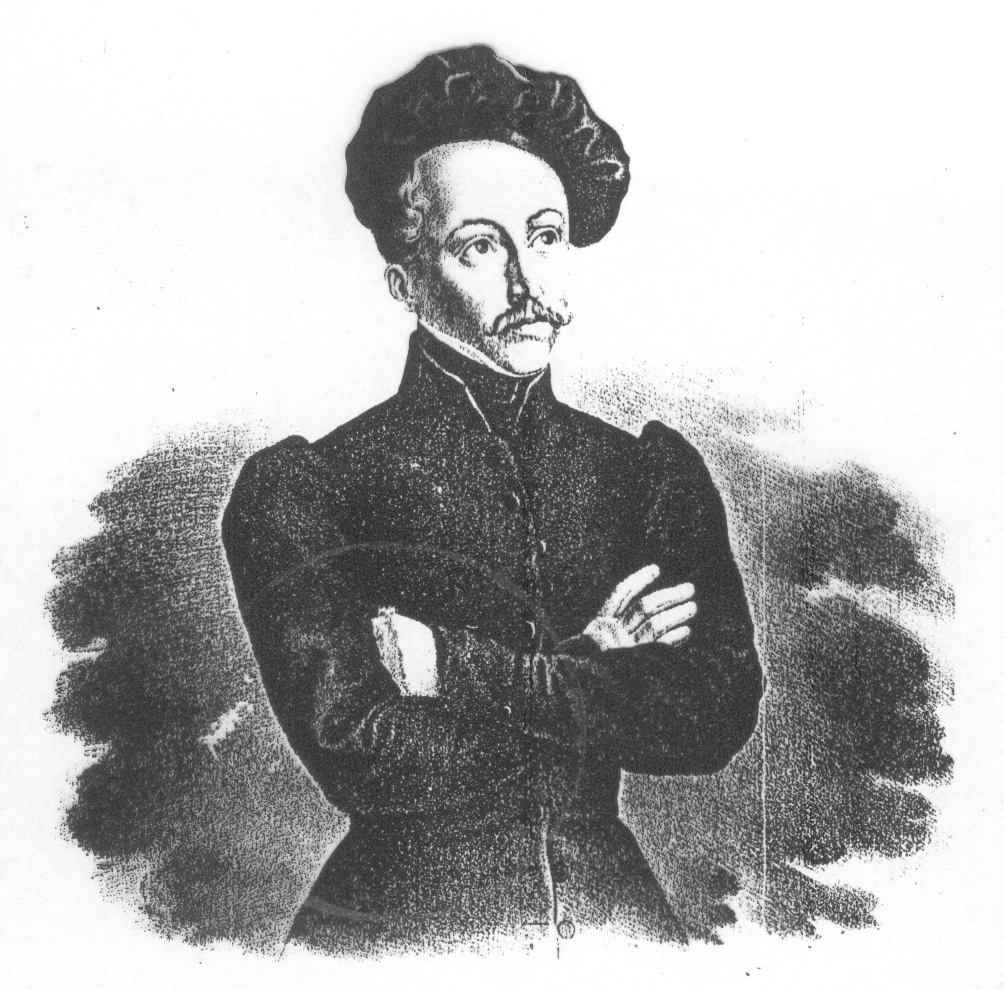
Harro Harring, 1832

== Early life ==
Harring was the son of a farm owner in Schleswig. First employed in the customs, he went to Copenhagen to devote himself to military historical painting. In 1820, he lived in Vienna and Würzburg, and then returned to Denmark. In 1821 he fought in the Greek War of Independence, and then went to Rome, where he stayed a year, then to Vienna in order to concentrate again on art.

Subsequently Harring lived in Switzerland and in Munich, and worked in Vienna as a playwright at the Theater an der Wien. He was in Prague and later went to Warsaw (1828), to enter as a cornet in a Russian lancer regiment.

== Itinerant revolutionary ==
As the 1830, July Revolution broke out in France, Harring returned to Germany, first to Braunschweig, then to Bavaria and Saxony. Expelled as a demagogue, he went to Strasbourg, where he edited the newspaper Das constitutionelle Deutschland and took part in the Hambach Festival (1832), but had to leave again for France.

Harring then lived in the Dijon–Châlons area, and met Italian activist and politician Giuseppe Mazzini. He took part in the republican attack on Savoie. He was arrested more than once in Switzerland, and expelled, after which he traveled to London. In May 1837, he was wounded in a gun battle and was living on the island of Helgoland. At that time a British colony where the inhabitants had no vote, his revolutionary views were unwelcome. The island governor Henry King ordered Harring to leave and sent for a warship to remove him. In September 1838, he was on Jersey, in the winter 1838-39 back in Helgoland, then in Bordeaux and Bruges; in 1841 he was in the Netherlands, and later lived in England and France. After a period in Brazil, in August 1843 he traveled to the United States, where he lived as a painter and writer.

The revolutions of 1848 lured Harring back to Germany and to the Danish Duchy of Schleswig. He was in Hamburg, then in Rendsburg, where he edited the newspaper Das Volk. On July 23, 1848, in the middle of the German-Danish civil war over the Duchy of Schleswig, Harring gave a speech in Bredstedt in North Frisia, where he called for a North Frisian Republic. At the end of the speech he drew a sword and quoted the North Frisian saying "better dead than a slave". Harring had positioned himself as an early representative of Scandinavism, was close to the Danish National Liberals and was a convinced Republican. As early as 1846 he had formulated: A united, free fatherland, from the North Cape to the beach of the Eider. So he quickly came into conflict with the German-oriented Schleswig-Holstein movement, which demanded annexation to Germany. In 1849, he was banished, and went to Christiania. His revolutionary writings on Norway incited the country to insurrection against its monarchical constitution. He had to leave in May 1850.

== Later life ==
Harring first went to back to Copenhagen, and then again to London, where he participated in a European "democratic central committee", in a poor condition. When he went to Hamburg in the year 1854, he was immediately arrested, and only through the mediation of the American consul was he able to go to America, staying until 1856 in Rio Janeiro; and then returned to the United Kingdom. From Jersey, he asked the Danish government to grant him just one place on home ground. He lived alternately in London and Jersey.

Towards the end of his life, Harring suffered from mental illness. On 25 May 1870, he was found lying dead on the floor of his bedroom in Jersey.

He had poisoned himself with phosphorus, from matches.

== Works ==
Harring was a prolific writer, of novels, drama and political verse. He published an autobiography in 1828, as Rhongar Jarr: Fahrten eines Friesen in Dänemark, Deutschland, Ungarn, Holland, Frankreich, Griechenland, Italien und der Schweiz. Karl Marx, in order to diminish other German revolutionaries in the same mould, mocked Harring's memoirs as developing an archetype (Urbild) to which others (meaning Gottfried Kinkel, Arnold Ruge, and Gustav Struve in particular) sought to conform.

=== Bibliography ===
- Blüthen der Jugendfahrt, 1821 (2nd. ed. 1825)
- Dichtungen, 1821
- Erzählungen, 1825
- Der Psariot. Der Khan. Poetische Erzählungen, 1825
- Die Mainotten. Der Corsar: Dramatische Gedichte, 1825
- Der Wildschütze: Ein Trauerspiel, 1825
- Der Student von Salamanca: Ein dramatisches Gedicht, 1825
- Cypressenlaub, Erzählungen, 1825
- Theokla. Der Armenier, 1827
- Erzählungen aus den Papieren eines Reisenden, 1827
- Szapary und Batthiany, Heldengedicht aus dem Ungarischen Türkenkriege, 1828
- Serenaden und Phantasien eines friesischen Sängers, nebst Klängen während des Stimmens (Vorläufer des Rhonghar Jarr), 1828
- Rhonghar Jarr. Fahrten eines Friesen in Dänemark, Deutschland, Ungarn, Holland, Frankreich, Griechenland, Italien und der Schweiz, 1828
- Theokla. Der Armenier, Trauerspiele, 1831
- Memoiren über Polen unter russischer Herrschaft. Nach zweijährigem Aufenthalt in Warschau, 1831 (also English)
- Die Schwarzen von Giessen, oder der Deutsche Bund, 1831
- Julius von Dreyfalken, des Schwärmers Wahn und Ende, 1831
- Erzählungen aus den Papieren eines Reisenden, 1831
- Erinnerungen aus Warschau. Nachträge zu den Memoiren über Polen, 1831
- Faust im Gewande der Zeit. Ein Schattenspiel mit Licht, 1831
- Der Renegat auf Morea, Trauerspiel, 1831
- Rosabianca. Das hohe Lied des Friesischen Sängers (Harro Harring) im Exil, 1831
- Der Pole. Ein Character-Gemälde aus dem dritten Decenium unsers Jahrhunderts, 1831
- Der Livorneser Mönch, 1831
- Der Carbonaro zu Spoleto: Politisch-satyrische Novelle, 1831
- Firn - Mathes, des Wildschützen Flucht. Szenen im Bayrischen Hochlande, 1831
- Der Russische Unterthan, 1832
- Blutstropfen. Deutsche Gedichte, 1832
- Die Völker. Ein dramatisches Gedicht, 1832
- Gedanken über Wahrheit, Liebe und Gerechtigkeit. Entwurf zu einer Volksvertretung und zur Bildung eines Volkes, demokratischen Grundsätzen, 1832
- Splitter und Balken. Erzählungen, Lebensläufe, Reiseblumen, Gedichte und Aphorismen, nebst Briefen über Literatur, 1832
- Chronique scandaleuse des Petersburger Hofes seit den Zeiten der Kaiserin Elisabeth Oder: Geheime Memoiren zur politischen und Regentengeschichte des Russischen Reichs aus der Periode von 1740 bis zum Tode des Grosfürsten Constantin. Aus dem Nachlasse eines alten Staatsmannes, 1832
- Die Monarchie oder die Geschichte vom König Saul, 1832
- Epistel an Lord Goderich über den Aufstand der Negersklaven auf Jamaika, mit Beziehung auf Hellas und Polen, 1833
- Poland under the dominion of Russia. Printed for I. S. Szymanski, 1834
- Mémoires sur la jeune Italie et sur les derniers événemens de Savoie, 1834
- Worte eines Menschen. Dem Glaubigen von La Mennais gewidmet, 1834
- Die Möwe. Deutsche Gedichte, 1835
- Skizze aus London. Besondre Vorrede zur Autobiographie eines Verbannten, 1838
- Traum des Scandinaviers, 1839
- Poesie eines Scandinaven, 1843
- Werke. Auswahl letzter Hand, 1844
- Rede an die Nordfriesen auf dem Bredstedter Marktplatz, 1848
- Dolores: A Historical Novel, 1853
- Historisches Fragment über die Entstehung der Arbeiter-Vereine und ihren Verfall in communistische Speculationen, 1852
- Rapport entre le magnétisme et la sphéréologie, 1856
- Dolores, Ein Charaktergemälde aus Süd-Amerika, 1858–1859
- Die Dynastie, 1859
- Carl den XIItes Død. Historisk Afhandling, 1864
