= Linda Franz =

American politician

Member of New Hampshire House of Representatives for Grafton 6
- Incumbent
- Assumed office December 4, 2024
- Preceded by: Jeffrey Greeson
- Succeeded by: Paul Goundrey (elect)

Personal details
- Party: Republican
- Website: graftonnhgop.com/linda-franz

Linda Franz is an American politician. She is a member of the New Hampshire House of Representatives.

In 2014, she and her husband Ron retired and moved to New Hampshire from Massachusetts. She was a member of the town council in Wentworth, New Hampshire.
