= Franz Collection =

Taiwanese porcelain brand

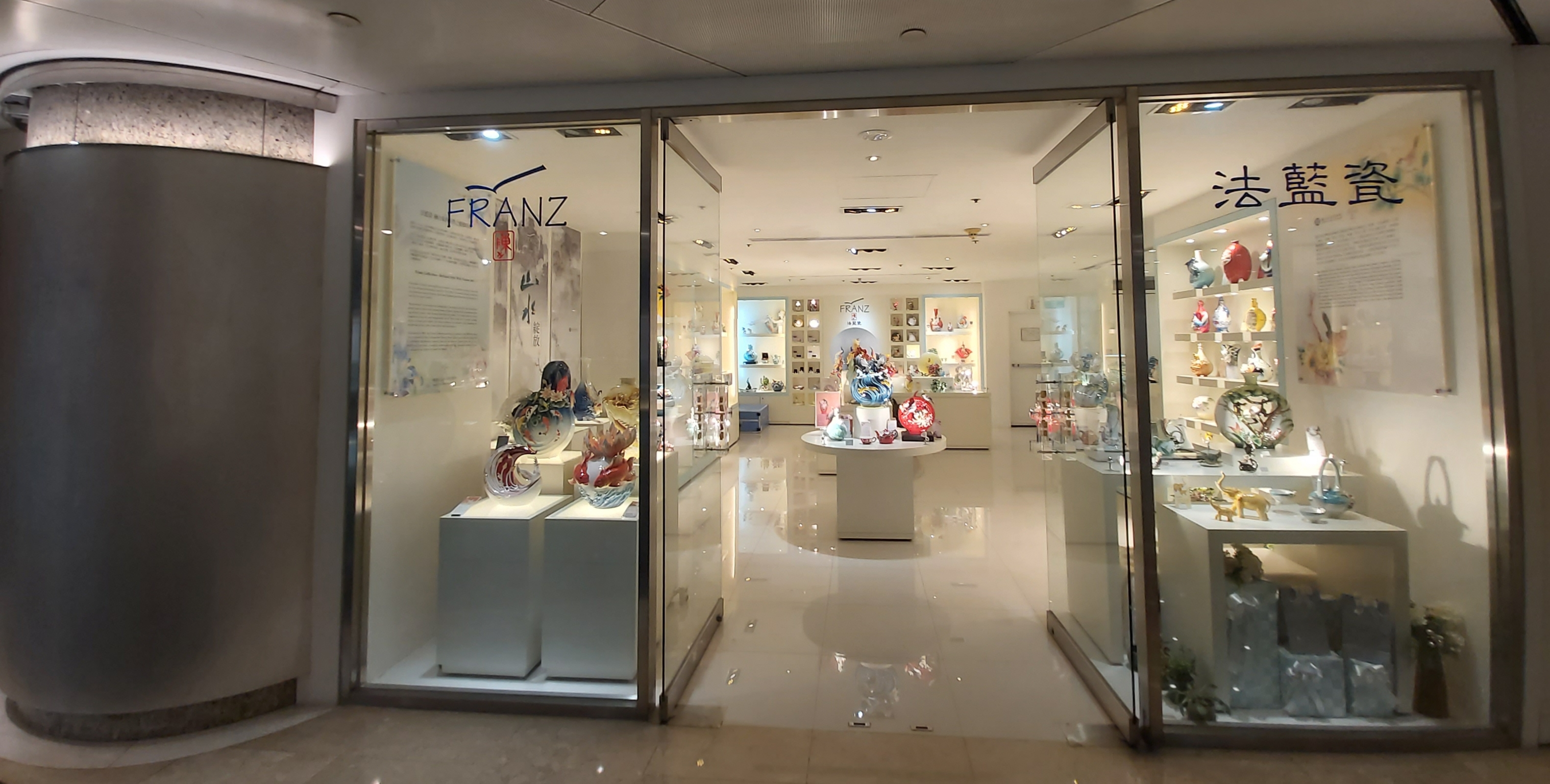
Shop of the Franz-porcelains at the Far Eastern Plaza, Taipei.

Franz Collection is a Taiwanese porcelain brand. It is named after the founder's German name "Franz". The products of this company include porcelain tableware, home decor, art collectible, and jewelry. Founded in 2001 and headquartered in Taipei, Franz Collection Inc. designs, creates and markets a variety of functional and home decor accessories.

In 2002, Francis (Li-Heng) Chen established Franz. Its design and research center is based in Taipei, Taiwan, with production moving to Mainland China in 2008. The scholar Shun-Ching Horng, An-Hsin, and Kuan-Yang Chen wrote in 2015, "it is quite exceptional that a young brand like Franz, has become the most well-known handicrafts brand in the greater China".

The company owns and operates approximately 100 retail stores in Asia. Its artworks have been distributed by retailers in 66 countries, including department stores and shopping centers such Bloomingdale's in the U.S., Mitsukoshi in Taiwan, Plaza Indonesia in Jakarta, Pavilion in Kuala Lumpur, Takashimaya in Singapore, Rustan’s in the Philippines, as well as Abu Dhabi Mall and the Mall of the Emirates in the United Arab Emirates. It has also done exhibitions at Harrods in London and Bergdorf Goodman in New York.
