= Franz Kreisel =

German ice hockey player (1890–1960)

Franz Kreisel (January 6, 1890 – November 18, 1960) was a German ice hockey player who competed in the 1928 Winter Olympics.

In 1928 he participated with the German ice hockey team in the Olympic tournament, in which the team failed to advance to the medal round. Kreisel was also considered an unofficial alternate for the Skijoring team due to his father's military experience and because some of the Skijoring team members were showing symptoms of dysentery; he was not needed, however.
