= Rikard Franzén =

Swedish ice hockey player

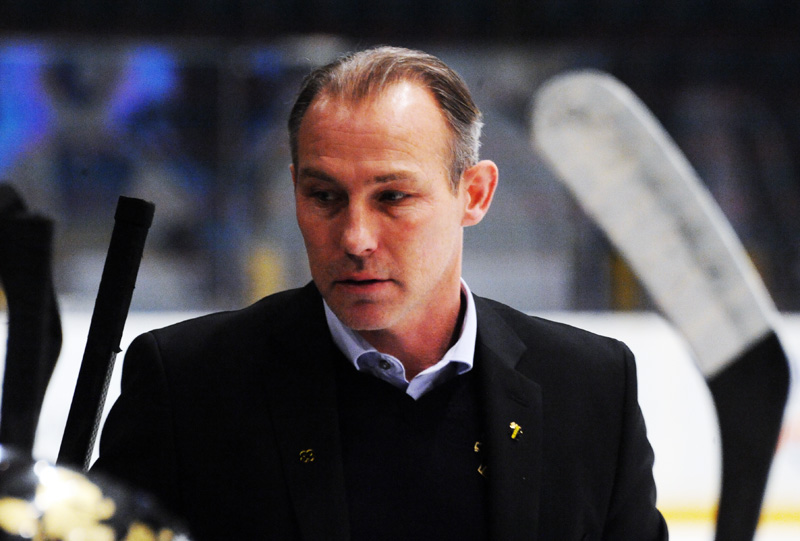
- Rikard Franzén coaching AIK in January 2014
- Born: March 21, 1968 (age 58) Huddinge, Sweden
- Height: 5 ft 10 in (178 cm)
- Weight: 189 lb (86 kg; 13 st 7 lb)
- Position: Defence
- Shot: Right
- Played for: AIK (SEL); Kölner Haie (DEL); SC Bern (NLA); Hannover Scorpions (DEL); Djurgårdens IF (SEL)
- Playing career: 1987–2005

Rikard Franzén (born March 21, 1968) is a Swedish retired professional ice hockey defenceman. Roger Franzén is his brother.

Franzén spent most of his career with AIK Hockey as their top defenceman. Having originally played for the team from 1988 to 1997, he moved to Germany's Deutsche Eishockey Liga with the Kölner Haie, but after one season he returned to AIK. In 2001, Franzén moved to Switzerland's Nationalliga A with SC Bern where he spent two seasons. He then returned to the DEL, signing for the Hannover Scorpions. In 2004, Franzén returned to Sweden with Djurgårdens IF before retiring.

== Career statistics ==
=== Regular season and playoffs ===
			Regular season					Playoffs
Season	Team	League	GP	G	A	Pts	PIM	GP	G	A	Pts	PIM
1985–86	Huddinge IK	Swe-2	29	3	7	10	40	—	—	—	—	—
1986–87	Huddinge IK	Swe-2	28	5	4	9	36	—	—	—	—	—
1987–88	AIK	SEL	22	3	6	9	16	5	0	1	1	6
1988–89	AIK	SEL	36	2	12	14	38	1	0	0	0	0
1989–90	AIK	SEL	34	7	10	17	46	3	2	0	2	2
1990–91	AIK	SEL	35	8	12	20	55	—	—	—	—	—
1991–92	AIK	SEL	37	5	12	17	40	3	0	0	0	4
1992–93	AIK	SEL	20	9	7	16	50	—	—	—	—	—
1992–93	AIK	Allsv.	18	6	9	15	24	2	1	2	3	2
1993–94	AIK	SEL	31	10	14	24	82	—	—	—	—	—
1994–95	AIK	SEL	39	12	13	25	42	—	—	—	—	—
1995–96	AIK	SEL	39	10	7	17	54	—	—	—	—	—
1996–97	AIK	SEL	47	10	13	23	46	7	2	1	3	18
1997–98	Kölner Haie	DEL	46	8	15	23	86	3	0	3	3	6
1998–99	AIK	SEL	33	6	10	16	61	—	—	—	—	—
1999–2000	AIK	SEL	49	17	29	46	54	—	—	—	—	—
2000–01	AIK	SEL	50	7	19	26	100	5	1	1	2	16
2001–02	SC Bern	NLA	44	7	18	25	54	2	0	0	0	4
2002–03	SC Bern	NLA	32	2	16	18	70	—	—	—	—	—
2002–03	EHC Biel	NLB	1	0	0	0	0	—	—	—	—	—
2003–04	Hannover Scorpions	DEL	30	3	6	9	20	—	—	—	—	—
2004–05	Djurgårdens IF	SEL	34	0	6	6	57	1	0	0	0	0
SEL totals			475	96	156	252	659	25	5	3	8	46
DEL totals			76	11	21	32	106	3	0	3	3	6
NLA totals			76	9	34	43	124	—	—	—	—	—

=== International ===
Year	Team	Event	GP	G	A	Pts	PIM
1986	Sweden	EJC	5	0	0	0	6
1987	Sweden	WJC	7	3	2	5	10
1988	Sweden	WJC	7	0	0	0	8
2000	Sweden	WC	5	0	1	1	6
Junior totals			19	3	2	5	24
