= Johan Wilhelm Eide =

- Born: 13 October 1832; Stryn, Nordre Bergenhus, Norway
- Died: 12 November 1896 (aged 64)
- Occupation(s): Printer, book publisher, newspaper publisher
- Known for: Founding Bergens Tidende and Eide Vorlag
- Spouses: Andrea Josephine Thunold (m. 1864; died 1866) Anne Marie Small (m. 1869)
- Children: 1

Johan Wilhelm Eide (13 October 1832 – 2 November 1896) was a Norwegian printer, book publisher, and newspaper publisher.

== Biography ==
Eide was born at Stryn in Nordre Bergenhus county, Norway. He was the son of Ole Olsen Ytre-Eide (1798-1869) and Anna Vebjørnsdatter (1803-1893). He was trained as an apprentice in Bergen at the printing plant of F. Beyer bokhandel. In 1857, he applied for a public grant to study book printing and font casts art abroad. He trained in Germany, Switzerland, France and Britain. In 1864, he returned to Bergen where he built up a printing and publishing business. In 1867, he established the printing company J.W. Eides Boktrykkeri. He founded the newspaper Bergens Tidende in 1868, and was a central contributor to this newspaper. In 1880 he founded the publishing house Eide Vorlag.

== Personal life ==
Eide was married twice. In 1864, he married Andrea Josephine Thunold (1833-1866), daughter of Ole Olsen Thunold and Karen Oline Olsdatter. In 1869, he married Anne Marie Small (1849-1923), daughter of Anders Olsen Lie (1801-1859) and Malene Rasmusdatter Hille (1812-1886). Eide was the father of architect Arne Bjornson Eide (1881-1957).
