= Johan Franzén (politician) =

Finnish politician (1879–1946)

Johan Franzén (11 November 1879, in Övermark – 3 June 1946) was a Finnish farmer, bank director and politician. He was a member of the Parliament of Finland from 1935 to 1936, representing the Swedish People's Party of Finland (SFP).
