= For Belarus! =

Political slogan in Belarus

For Belarus! (За Беларусь! in both Russian and Belarusian) was a campaign slogan used in Belarus starting in 2004 to push for constitutional alterations inside the country, which consisted of (1) enabling a citizen to become the country's president for more than two times (as had been the case until 2004) and (2) to allow the current president Alexander Lukashenko to run for a third term. The campaign was usually announced and spread by using television airtime, public concerts or billboards erected in the country. The campaign was used again in the 2006 presidential elections, with the addition of a song played on Belarusian Television on the day of the elections. The campaign was also used by the BRSM to support the government's discourse on patriotism (in contrast to that of the political opposition: e.g. the Belarusian Popular Front, which uses another slogan: "Long Live Belarus!").

== Use ==
The characteristics of the campaign include the use of the phrase occasionally with the addition of names or organizations, such as workers or the military, and attributes such as "stable", "flourishing", "strong" Belarus. The letters "ЗA" ("for") are always capitalized and colored red and green, invoking the national flag. In this layout, the word "ЗA" has national connotations and is visually prominent, suggesting that it is the most important word in the slogan. Thus, it was suggested to the electorate that they should vote "for", that is, for the constitutional reforms that enabled president Lukashenko to run for his third term (2004) and to vote for him in the 2006 presidential elections, because it correlates with voting "for Belarus". Belarusian state-owned media depict the political opposition as a subversive group that intends to disorganise the country and "sell" it to the "West". From this point of view, the slogan may easily be interpreted as an identification of the current president or government with Belarus. To vote for someone else would then mean to vote against the interests of the country and its people.

== See also ==
- Elections in Belarus
