= Marián Vitko =

Slovak volleyball player (born 1994)

Personal information
- Nationality: Slovak
- Born: February 10, 1994 (age 32); Svidník
- Height: 1.80 cm (1 in)
- Weight: 74 kg (163 lb)

Volleyball information
- Position: Libero
- Current club: (Hungary) Vegyész RC Kazincbarcika
- Number: 11

Career
Years	Teams
2013-2016; 2016-2018; 2018-2019; 2019	(Slovakia) VK Slávia Svidník (Slovakia) VK KDS Šport Košice (Slovakia) Spartak VKP Myjava (Hungary) Vegyész RC Kazincbarcika

Marián Vitko (born February 10, 1994) is a Slovak volleyball player, a member of the hungarian club Vegyész RC Kazincbarcika.

== Sporting achievements ==
=== Clubs ===
Slovakian Championship:

- 2014

Hungarian Championship:

- 2019
