= Christian Franzen (businessman) =

American politician (1845–1920)

Christian Franzen (December 11, 1845 – March 19, 1920) was an American politician, farmer, and businessman.

Born in the Duchy of Holstein, which was functionally connected with Denmark, Franzen was a cabin boy. In 1863, Franzen emigrated to the United States, went to Wisconsin, in 1870, and settled in Marathon County, Wisconsin in 1876. He was a farmer in the town of Bergen. In 1903, he moved to Stratford, Wisconsin, Franzen was in the insurance, telephone, and bank business. He served on the Marathon County Board of Supervisors and was chairman of the board. He also served as town school clerk and town assessor. In 1915, Franzen served in the Wisconsin State Assembly and was a Democrat.
