= Franz Xaver Nachtmann =

German painter (1799–1846)

Franz Xaver Nachtmann (September 6, 1799 – December 17, 1846) was a German painter. He attended the Academy of Fine Arts, Munich from 1814 to 1819. He later served as a flower painter at the Nymphenburg Porcelain Manufactory. He left Nymphenburg Porcelain Manufactory in 1827 and began working on landscape and architecture paintings. He died on December 17, 1846, after eight years of suffering a spinal disease.

== Gallery ==
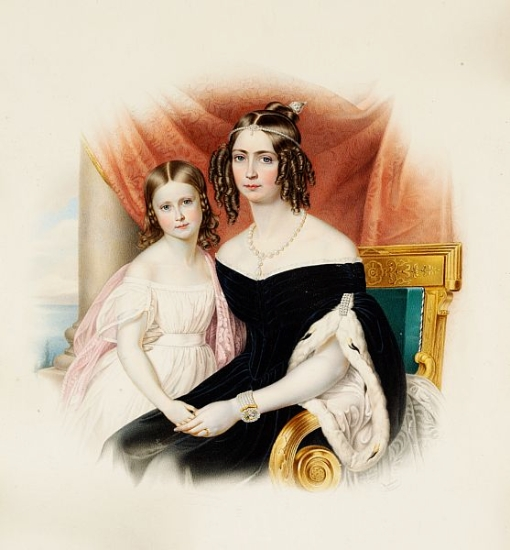

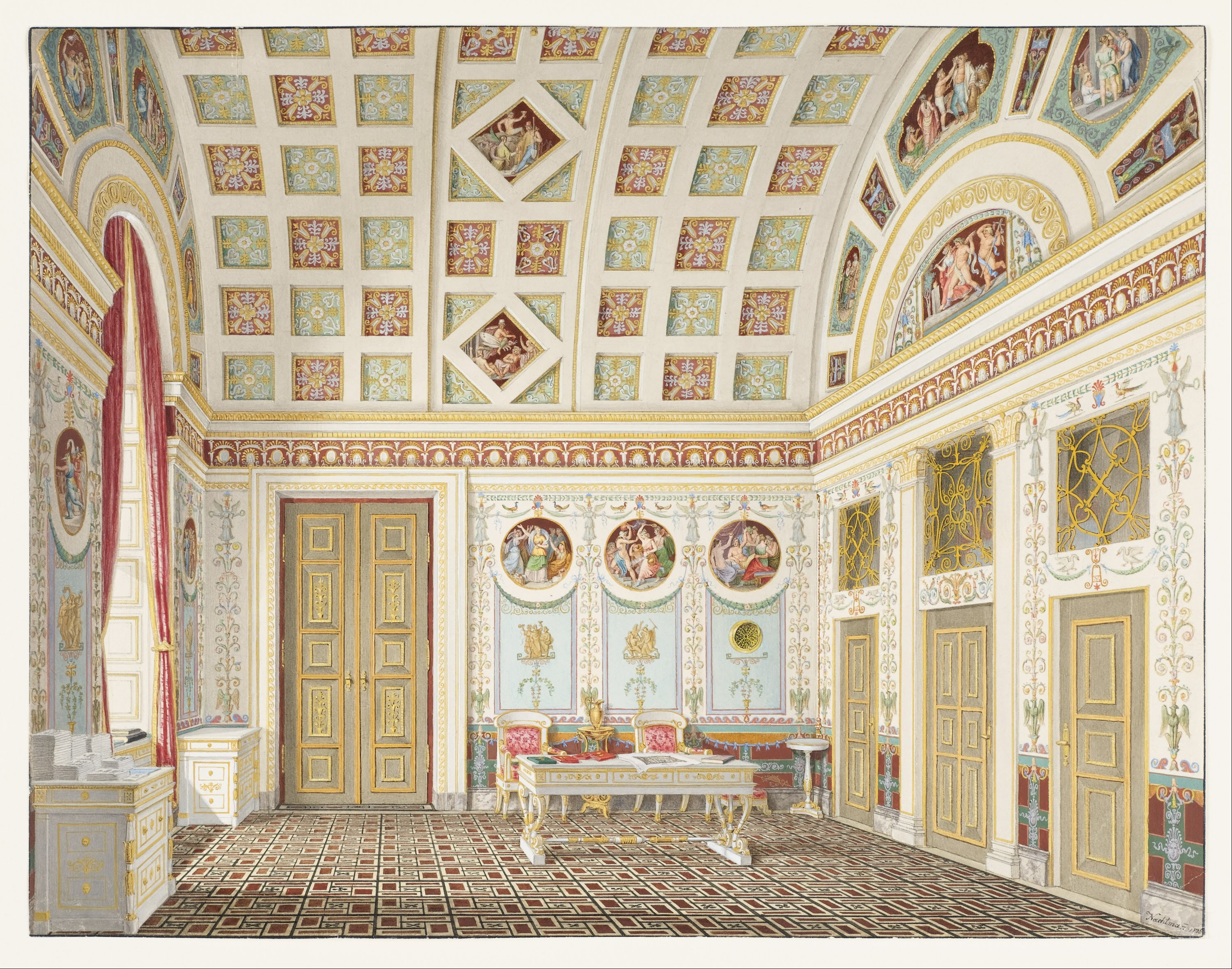

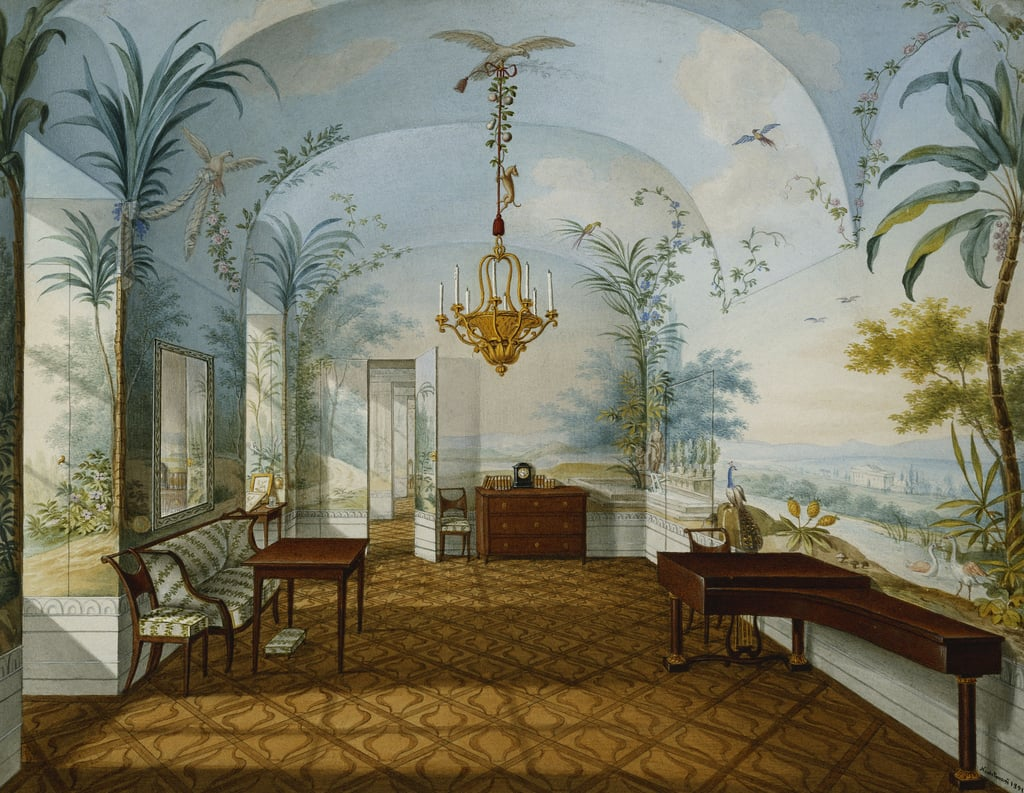

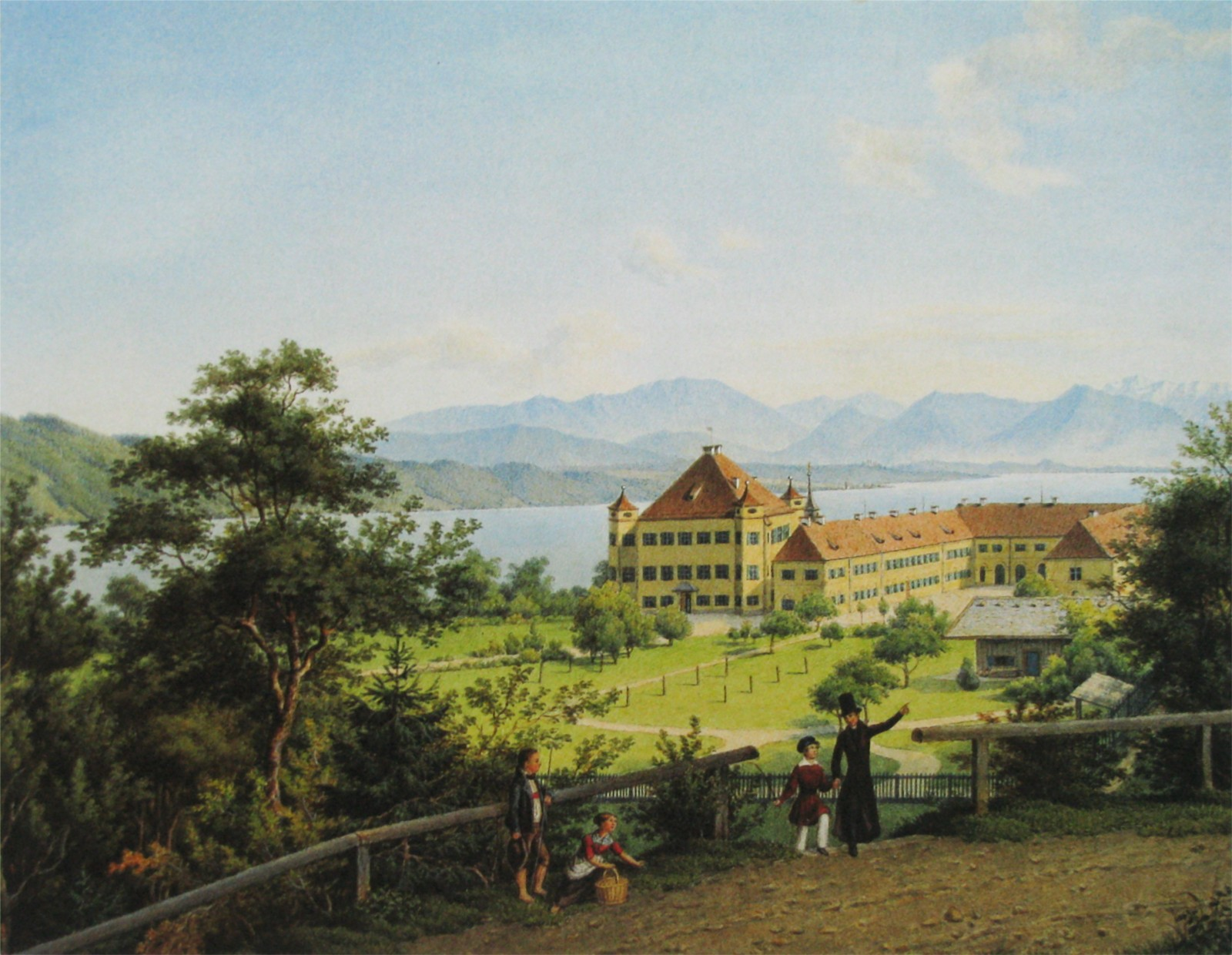

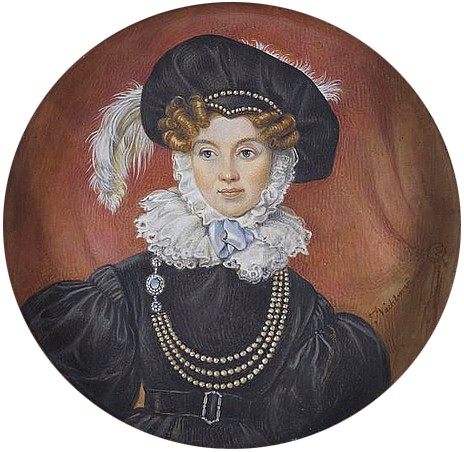
