= Franz Ferdinand Schulze =

German chemist and microbiologist (1815–1873)

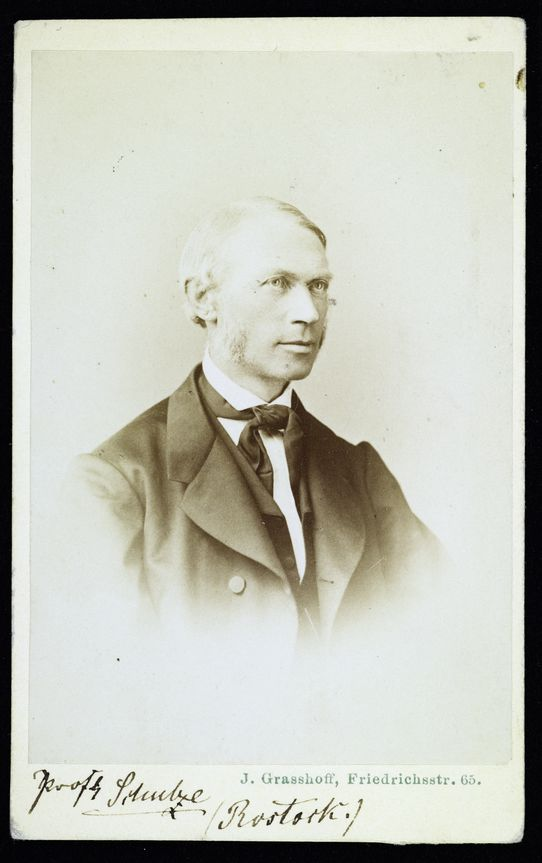
Carte-de-visite, albumen print

Franz Ferdinand Schulze (17 January 1815 – 14 April 1873) was a German professor of chemistry and microbiology who taught at the Royal Prussian State Agricultural Academy in Eldena and later at Rostock. He innovated analytical techniques, particularly making use of specially blown glass tubes. He examined questions such as spontaneous generation in his experiments. He was able to demonstrate that when air was bubbled through sulfuric acid, the resulting air did not produce any growth in carefully sterilized culture media. He translated J. F. W. Johnston's Elements of Agricultural Chemistry and Geology (1841) into German. He coined the name of the wood component lignin in 1857.

== Life and work ==
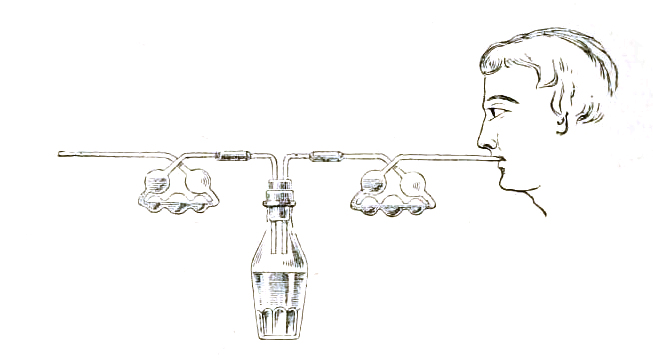
Schulze's 1836 setup for air treatment in experiments on spontaneous generation

Schulze was born in Naumburg, second son of a craftsman. An uncle took care of him from the age of ten, and he grew up in Meissen where he went to school. He returned to Naumburg where he passed his abitur in 1832 and then went to study in Leipzig. Here he took an interest in the natural sciences and listened to lectures in zoology at Berlin by Hinrich Lichtenstein. He received a doctorate with a dissertation on "De planariarum vivendi ratione et structura penitiore" following which he worked in Eilhard Mitscherlich's laboratory. He became a teacher of chemistry at the newly founded Agricultural Academy in Eldena in 1835 and habilitated in 1837 at the University of Greifswald. He wrote a textbook on agricultural chemistry and in 1850 he moved to Rostock as a full professor. He continued some of the agricultural chemistry investigations he had begun at Eldena and became more involved in the study of hygiene. After cholera struck Rostock in 1866, he conducted studies on airborne micro-organisms, noting their possible role in putrefaction. As early as 1836, he built glassware to bubble air through sulfuric acid to demonstrate that such treated air did not lead to growth on sterile and isolated media. This method was developed on by Theodor Schwann, John Tyndall and others in the early debates on spontaneous generation.

Schulze married Charlotte, daughter of Sydow zu Charlottenburg, in Eldena in 1839 and they had two sons, the older Franz Eilhard Schulze (the middle name from his godfather Mitscherlich) became a zoologist. After the death of Charlotte in 1850 he married Mathilde von Langermann in 1852. He died from pneumonia at Rostock.
