= Frantz Bruun =

Norwegian priest

Frantz Gottlieb Bruun (19 March 1832 – 6 October 1908) was a Norwegian priest.

He was born in Vikør as the son of Fredrik Christian Bruun and Anna Hegelund Krogh Irgens. His mother Anna was a paternal granddaughter of the bishop Ole Irgens and maternal granddaughter of Johan Daniel Stub.

He was ordained as a priest in the Church of Norway, but had to leave his office in Finnmark in 1868 due to health problems. However, he later resurfaced as an orthodox revivalist preacher based in Kristiansand and Kristiania. Several of his texts were printed and published.

He died in 1908 in Østre Aker.
