= Belarusian Republican Youth Union =

Belarusian youth organisation

Belarusian Republican Youth Union Белорусский республиканский союз молодежи
- National Council Secretary: Alexander Lukyanov
- Founded: 6 September 2002
- Headquarters: Minsk, Belarus
- Ideology: Pro-Lukashenko; Patriotism; Anti-Young Front
- Website: brsm.by

Flag

The Belarusian Republican Youth Union (Belarusian: Беларускі рэспубліканскі саюз моладзі, romanized: Bielaruski respublikanski sajuz moladzi (БРСМ), Russian: Белорусский республиканский союз молодежи, romanized: Belorussky respublikansky soyuz molodezhi (БРСМ, BRSM)) is a youth organization in Belarus. Its goals are to promote patriotism and to instill moral values into the youth of Belarus, using activities such as camping, sporting events, and visiting memorials. The organization was created after a merger of other youth groups in 2002 and is the successor of the Komsomol of the Byelorussian SSR. The BRSM is the largest youth group in Belarus and is supported by the Belarusian government. Some people have accused the group of using methods of coercion and empty promises in order to recruit new members and of being used as propaganda for the government of Alexander Lukashenko.

== Creation ==
The BRSM was created on 6 September 2002, after the merger of two Belarusian youth organizations, the Belarusian Youth Union, the legal successor of the Komsomol branch in the Byelorussian SSR, and the Belarusian Patriotic Youth Union, created in 1997 by the decree of president of Belarus Alexander Lukashenko. Lukashenko also issued decrees that gave the BRSM governmental support, mostly from the ministry of education and the presidential administration. President Lukashenko stated in his 2003 address to the nation the need for the BRSM to play a key role in Belarusian life:

The youth — our major pillar — is at the heart of our plans and targets. We have hardly used its powerful potential yet. We often "brush aside" youth's initiatives. Many managers avoid direct contact with the youth, they are afraid of acute questions. They are incapable of involving young people into useful public activities. We should work in this direction. It will help avoid a number of negative phenomena in the youth environment. This situation calls for a greater role of the Belarusian Republican Youth Union. It should demonstrate its abilities as an organizer, a leader of the national youth movement.

== Organization ==
The BRSM national headquarters is located in Minsk, the national capital of Belarus. Each region—Minsk, Brest, Vitebsk, Gomel, Grodno and Mogilev—has its own branches of the BRSM. The BRSM has estimated that it has 6,803 branches located inside Belarus.

The national leadership of the BRSM is controlled by the central committee, which is headed by the first secretary of the central committee. Leonid Kovalev was elected as first secretary in 2006. Below the first secretary are the second secretary of the central committee, the chairman of the central investigation commission, and three secretaries of the central committee. Collectively, these leaders are also referred to as the secretariat of the BRSM.

While the exact yearly and total funding of the BRSM are not known, the majority of funds given to the BRSM are given by the national government.

== Symbols ==
The Komsomol badge, for comparison

The BRSM has two official symbols: an emblem and a flag. The emblem, which is based on the Komsomol badge and modeled on the Belarusian national flag, has a red bar bearing the initials of the BRSM, written in gold in Cyrillic, over a green bar bearing a golden olive branch.

The flag of the BRSM has the same elements as the emblem, but the reverse of the flag bears the organization's full name in gold (in Russian) in the red section, with the green section unemblazoned.

== Membership ==
In order to join the BRSM, the applicant must be between the ages of 14 and 31 years and must send a photo of himself or herself. If the applicant is between the ages of 14 and 16 years written permission from a parent or legal guardian must be granted. A count in 2003 by the Institute for War and Peace Reporting showed that the BRSM had roughly 120,000 members.

A person must also pay a one-time fee of 3 Belarusian rubles (around US$1.22) and a mid-year fee to continue membership in the BRSM. The total amount of the fee is adjusted based on the person's working and living status, and fee waivers are granted for children who are orphaned or disabled.

== Activities ==
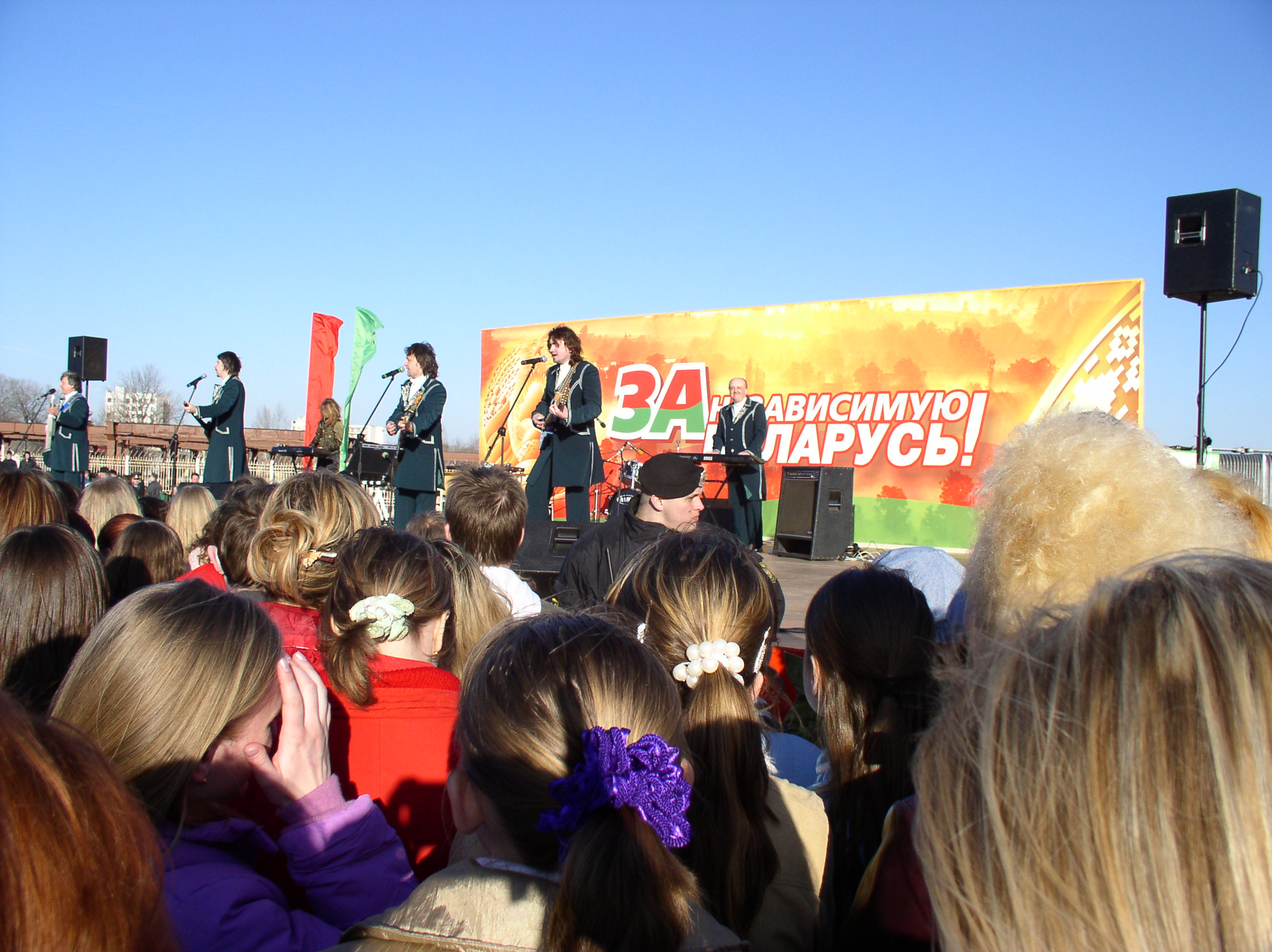
A 2007 "For Independent Belarus" concert in Minsk hosted by the BRSM

Most of the BRSM's activities are similar to those that were performed by the Soviet Komsomol. The main activities of the BRSM involve the promotion of Belarusian patriotism. This is accomplished by participating in wreath-laying ceremonies at various memorials around the country. BRSM members also pass out flowers to veterans of the Great Patriotic War (World War II) to honor their service during the national holiday Den Pobedy (Day of Victory). Both the memorial visits and the flowers for the veterans give BRSM members an idea of what sacrifices their ancestors made. During other national holidays, the BRSM passes out a ribbon that resembles the national flag of Belarus, to be worn on a shirt or jacket. This program, along with other events, is part of its "For Belarus!" (Belarusian: За Беларусь!) campaign.

The BRSM participates in outdoor activities and sports, including football, running, swimming and hockey. Some of these athletic events involve different groups from inside Belarus or from neighboring countries, such as Russia, Ukraine or Latvia. BRSM members also participate in competitions amongst themselves or with other foreign groups that are similar to the BRSM.

Social events, such as concerts for the youth of Belarus, are hosted by the BRSM. However, there have been some occasions during BRSM-sponsored concerts when neo-Nazis were not only in attendance but were also performing in the show. The BRSM has been criticized for this by local leaders and veterans. The BRSM was one of the main organizers of the 2004 "Miss Belarus" pageant, a beauty competition along the same lines as Miss America and Miss Universe. While the BRSM does not get involved in politics, its first secretary, Mikhail Orda, signed a letter along with other public officials denouncing the United States' Belarus Democracy Act of 2004.

BRSM organizes student construction brigades, a practice also originated in the Soviet Union.

== Criticism ==
Inside of Belarus, the BRSM has been accused of using unethical methods to increase its membership. The claim, made by teachers and students in Belarus, is that members who joined the BRSM either did so by coercion or were lured by promises, which included discounts at local businesses, living in good dormitories, and assistance in finding a job after college. In 1999 it was reported that Belarusian opposition activists called the predecessor of the BRSM, the BPSM, "Lukamol" (Лукамол). The term is a combination of the words Lukashenko and Komsomol, because of the use of the youth group by Lukashenko to further his political base and his cult of personality.

Human Rights Watch, a group that monitors human rights abuses around the world, has also criticized the BPSM for limiting academic freedom on Belarusian college campuses. HRW noted in a report filed in 1999 that

although [the BPSM are] ostensibly politically neutral, the centralization of appointments of rectors and the increasingly institutionalized position occupied by the BPSM in student life have created a campus environment conducive to propagation of political orthodoxy and the squelching of independent views rather than one conducive to the open-ended inquiry and expression essential to academic excellence.

HRW also noted in the same 1999 report that members influence the entrance board to exclude candidates who use the Belarusian language as their preferred language or those who have opposing political point of views.

The United Nations has stated that Lukashenko's government has, either directly or indirectly, created non-governmental organizations (NGOs) that are used by the government as tools of publicity. The UN contends in a report released in early 2003 that the BRSM will mostly be used by President Lukashenko as a tool to recruit officials into his government. The same report also commented on how other youth NGOs are having problems with funding and that their members face expulsion from their schools, thus having to join groups like the BRSM as a last resort.

== International sanctions ==
In June 2024, the BRSM and the first secretary of its Central Committee, Alexander Lukyanov, were added to the European Union's sanctions list. In July, Switzerland, Albania, Bosnia and Herzegovina, Iceland, Liechtenstein, Moldova, Montenegro, North Macedonia, Norway, Ukraine joined these sanctions.
