= Franz von Dingelstedt =

19th-century German poet and dramatist (1814–1881)

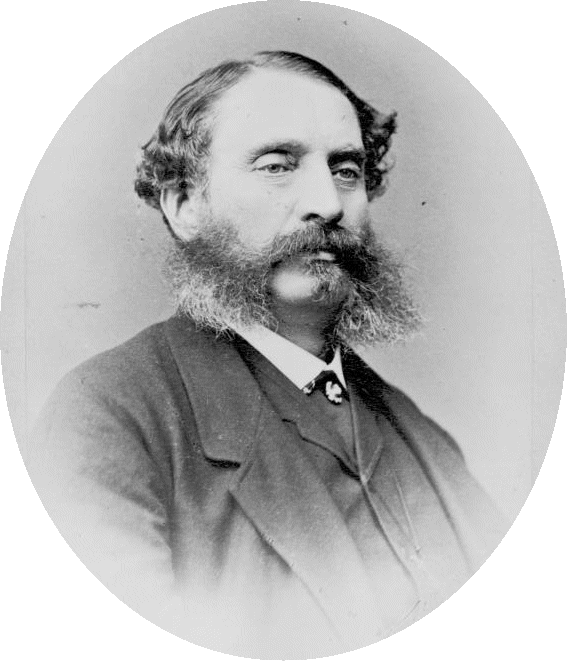
Franz von Dingelstedt, photograph by Fritz Luckhardt

Franz von Dingelstedt (30 June 1814 – 15 May 1881) was a German poet, dramatist and theatre administrator.

== Life and career ==
Dingestedt was born at Halsdorf, Hesse-Kassel (or Hesse-Cassel), Germany, and later studied at the University of Marburg nearby. In 1836 he became a master at the Lyceum in Kassel, from where he was transferred to Fulda in 1838. In 1839 he wrote Unter der Erde ("Beneath the Earth"), a novel which obtained considerable success. In 1841, Lieder eines kosmopolitischen Nachtwächters, the book by which he is best remembered, was published. These poems, animated as they are by a spirit of bitter opposition to everything that savours of despotism, were an effective contribution to the political poetry of the day.

The popularity of this book determined Dingelstedt to take up a literary career, and in 1841 he obtained an appointment on the staff of the Augsburger Allgemeine Zeitung. In 1843, however, the satirist of German princes accepted, to general surprise, his appointment as private librarian to the king of Württemberg. In the same year he married the celebrated Bohemian opera singer, Jenny Lutzer (1816-1877). In 1845 he published a volume of poems dealing with then modern life, some of which possessed merit of a literary rather than strictly poetical nature. A subsequent collection, published in 1852, attracted little attention.

He attained the position of intendant at the court theatre in Munich as a result of the success of his tragedy Das Haus der Barneveldt (1850), and he soon became the center of literary society there. He incurred, however, the animosity of the Jesuit clique at court, and in 1856 was suddenly dismissed on the most frivolous of charges. A similar position was offered to him at Weimar through the influence of Liszt, and he remained there until 1867. His administration was most successful, and he especially distinguished himself by presenting all Shakespeare's historical plays upon the stage in an unbroken cycle.

In 1867 he became director of the court opera house in Vienna, and in 1872 of the Hofburgtheater, a position which he held until his death in Vienna on 15 May 1881. He was ennobled in 1867 by the king of Bavaria and in 1876 was created Freiherr by the emperor of Austria. His remains are buried beside his wife's at Wiener Zentralfriedhof.

His other works include Münchener Bilderbogen (1879), an autobiographical sketch of his Munich career, Die Amazone, an art novel of considerable merit (1869), translations of several of Shakespeare's comedies, and several writings dealing with questions of practical dramaturgy.

Dingelstedt's Sämtliche Werke appeared in 12 volumes (1877–1878), but this edition was far from complete.
