= Federation of Trade Unions of Belarus =

Trade union confederation in Belarus

FPB/FTUB
- Federation of Trade Unions of Belarus
- Founded: 5 October 1990
- Location: Belarus
- Key people: Yuri Senko, chairman
- Affiliations: WFTU, GCTU
- Website: https://1prof.by/

The Federation of Trade Unions of Belarus (Belarusian: Федэрацыя прафсаюзаў Беларусі, romanized: Fiederacyja prafsajuzaŭ Bielarusi; Russian: Федерация профсоюзов Беларуси) is a trade union centre in Belarus. It has evolved from the Soviet-era official unions. In 1990s, it has been in conflict with the government over issues such as living standards and union interference. However, in the 21st century, the Federation became a pro-government organization, and its true goal changed to protecting the power of Alexander Lukashenko, rather than the interests of workers.
