= Francis Xavier (name) =

This is a list of persons named after Saint Francis Xavier. The list includes cognates of the name Francis Xavier in other languages, including:

- Francesc Xavier – Catalan
- Francesco Saverio – Italian
- Francisco Javier – Spanish
- Francisco Xavier – Portuguese
- Franciszek Ksawery – Polish
- François Xavier – French
- František Xaver – Czech
- Franz Xaver – German

== Persons ==
- A. F. X. Baron (Anthony Francis Xavier Baron) (1913–1974), British far-right political figure of the 1940–1950s
- Antoine Labelle (François-Xavier-Antoine Labelle) (1833–1891), Roman Catholic priest; principally responsible for the settlement (or "colonization") of the Laurentians
- Antonio Francisco Xavier Alvares (1836–1923), Portuguese Roman Catholic priest in Goa and British India
- Antonio Soler (Antonio Francisco Javier José Soler Ramos), (1729–1783), Spanish composer of the late Baroque and early Classical periods
- Auguste Comte (Isidore Auguste Marie François Xavier Comte) (1798–1857), French philosopher; founder of the discipline of sociology
- Brennan Manning (Richard Francis Xavier Manning) (born 1934), American author, friar, priest, and speaker
- Charles F. X. O'Brien (1879–1940), American politician from New Jersey; U.S. Representative
- Charles de Limburg Stirum (Charles Gaëtan Corneille Marie François-Xavier Ghislain de Limburg Stirum) (1906–1989), Belgian nobleman and senator; Grand Master of the House of King Leopold III
- Chechu (Francisco Javier Flores Gómez) (born 1982), Spanish professional football player
- Don Francisco Javier Sauza (1903–1990), Mexican businessman
- Eugenio Espejo (Francisco Javier Eugenio de Santa Cruz y Espejo) (1747–1795), Ecuadoran physician, writer, and lawyer
- F. X. Martin (Francis Xavier Martin) (1922–2000), Irish cleric, historian, and activist
- Fran (footballer, born 1969) (Francisco Javier González Pérez), Spanish professional football player
- Fran Healy (baseball) (Francis Xavier Healy) (born 1946), American professional baseball player
- Fran Moreno (Francisco Javier Moreno Jiménez) (born 1984), Spanish professional football player
- Frances Xavier Cabrini (Mother Cabrini) (1850–1917), first American citizen to be canonized by the Roman Catholic Church
- Francesc Arnau (Francesc Xavier Arnau Grabulosa) (born 1975), Catalan Spanish professional football player
- Francesc Xavier Butinyà i Hospital (1834–1899), Catalan missionary Jesuit, teacher, and writer
- Francesco Geminiani (Francesco Saverio Geminiani) (1687–1762), Italian violinist, composer, and music theorist
- Francesco Saverio de Zelada (1717–1801), Spanish cardinal of the Roman Catholic Church and diplomat of the Holy See
- Francesco Saverio Mergalo (1746–1786), Italian painter of the Rococo or late-Baroque period
- Francesco Saverio Merlino (1856–1930), Italian lawyer, anarchist activist, and theorist of libertarian socialism
- Francesco Saverio Nitti (1868–1953), Italian economist and politician; Prime Minister of Italy 1919–20
- Francis Bianchi (Saint Francis Xavier Bianchi), (1743–1815), Italian Barnabite priest
- Francis Healy (baseball) (Francis Xavier Paul Healy) (1910–1997), American professional baseball player
- Francis X. Bushman (1883–1966), American actor, film director, and screenwriter
- Francis X. Cretzmeyer (1913–2001), American collegiate track and field coach
- Francis X. DiLorenzo (born 1942), American bishop of the Roman Catholic Church; bishop of the Diocese of Honolulu, Hawaii; bishop of the Diocese of Richmond, Virginia
- Francis X. Prefontaine (François Xavier Préfontaine) (1838–1909), French Canadian missionary; founded the first Catholic parish in Seattle
- Francis Xavier Caldwell (1792–1851), Canadian businessman and political figure
- Francis Xavier Clooney (born 1950), American priest and professor
- Francis Xavier Dercum (1856–1931), American physician
- Francis Xavier Ford (1892–1952), American Roman Catholic missionary to China
- Francis Xavier Gartland (1805–1854), Irish American prelate of the Roman Catholic Church, Bishop of Savannah, Georgia
- Francis Xavier Gsell (1872–1960), Australian Roman Catholic bishop and missionary to Papua
- Francis Xavier Irwin (born 1934), retired Auxiliary Bishop in the Archdiocese of Boston
- Francis Xavier Krautbauer (1828–1885), bishop of the Roman Catholic Diocese of Green Bay, Wisconsin
- Francis Xavier Kurrupuwu (born 1961), Australian politician
- Francis Xavier Lasance (1860–1946), American priest and writer of Roman Catholic devotional works
- Francis Xavier Leray (1825–1887), French-born prelate of the Roman Catholic Church; Bishop of Natchitoches and Archbishop of New Orleans
- Francis Xavier Mancuso (1887–1970), American politician, leader of Tammany Hall
- Francis Xavier Patrizi (1797–1881), Italian Jesuit exegete
- Francis Xavier Pierz (1785–1880), Austrian Roman Catholic priest and missionary to North America
- Francis Xavier Plessis (born 1694), clergyman of New France, missionary to the First Nations
- Francis Xavier Schmalzgrueber (1663–1735), German Jesuit canonist
- Francis Xavier Seelos (1819–1867), German-American Roman Catholic priest
- Francis Xavier Vira Arpondratana (born 1955), Bishop of Chiang Mai, Thailand
- Francis Xavier Weninger (1805–1888), Austrian Jesuit missionary and author
- Francisco Arce (Francisco Javier Arce Rolón) (born 1971), Paraguayan professional football player
- Francisco Arce Montes (Francisco Xavier Arce Montes) (born 1950), Spanish serial abuser and murderer; imprisoned
- Francisco Arias Cárdenas (Francisco Javier Arias Cárdenas) (born 1950), Venezuelan politician, military officer, and ambassador
- Francisco Barraza (Francisco Javier Barraza Rodríguez) (born before 1991), Mexican band musician
- Francisco Barrio (Francisco Javier Barrio Terrazas) (born 1950), Mexican politician; governor and government minister
- Francisco Barrios (Francisco Javier (Jiménez) Barrios) (1953–1928), Mexican professional baseball player
- Francisco Cerezo (Francisco Javier Cerezo Perales) (born 1971), Spanish professional football player
- Francisco Clavet (Francisco Javier Clavet González) (born 1968), Spanish professional tennis player and coach
- Francisco Cordero (Francisco Javier Cordero) (born 1975), Dominican professional baseball player
- Francisco Felix (Francisco Javier Felix) (born 1983), Mexican American professional baseball player
- Francisco Ibáñez Campos (Francisco Javier Ibáñez Campos) (born 1986), Chilean professional football player
- Francisco J. Santamaría (1886–1963), Mexican writer and politician
- Francisco Javier Aguilar García (born 1949), Spanish professional association football player
- Francisco Javier Alegre (1729–1788), Jesuit scholar, translator, and historian of New Spain
- Francisco Javier Álvarez Colinet (born 1983), Spanish musician; member of the boyband D'NASH
- Francisco Javier Arana (1905–1949), member of the revolutionary junta that ruled Guatemala 1944–45
- Francisco Javier Arellano Félix (born 1969), Mexican drug lord and leader of the Tijuana Cartel
- Francisco Javier Benet (born 1968), Spanish Olympic decathlete
- Francisco Javier Castaños, 1st Duke of Bailén (1758–1852), Spanish general officer
- Francisco Javier Clavijero (1731–1787), Novohispano Jesuit teacher, scholar, and historian
- Francisco Javier Cruz (born 1966), Mexican professional football player
- Francisco Javier de Balmis (1753–1819), Spanish physician who headed an 1804 expedition to New Spain to vaccinate the populations against smallpox
- Francisco Javier de Burgos y Sarragoiti (1842–1902), Spanish journalist and author of comic theater
- Francisco Javier de Elío (1767–1822), Spanish military governor of Montevideo and last Viceroy of the Río de la Plata
- Francisco Javier de Istúriz y Montero (1790–1871), Spanish politician and diplomat
- Francisco Javier de la Torre (fl. 1764–1765), Spanish governor-general of the Philippines 1764–65
- Francisco Javier de Lizana y Beaumont (1750–1811), Spanish bishop of Mexico and viceroy of New Spain 1809–10
- Francisco Javier de Morales y Castejón de Arrollo (fl. 1770–1772), Spanish soldier and interim governor of Chile from 1770 to 1772
- Francisco Javier de Viana (1764–1820), Argentine sailor, soldier, and politician
- Francisco Javier Domínguez Brito (born 1965), Dominican Republic politician
- Francisco Javier Echeverría (1797–1852), Mexican businessman and politician; president of Mexico 1841
- Francisco Javier Errázuriz Ossa (born 1933), Chilean Cardinal Priest and the Archbishop of Santiago
- Francisco Javier Errázuriz Talavera (born 1942), Chilean businessman and former presidential candidate
- Francisco Javier Fernández (born 1977), Spanish Olympic race walker
- Francisco Javier García Fajer (1730–1809), Spanish composer
- Francisco Javier García Guerrero (born 1976), Spanish professional football player
- Francisco Javier García (born 1987), Spanish professional footballer
- Francisco Javier Gaxiola (1870–1933), Mexican lawyer, politician and diplomat
- Francisco Javier Gómez Noya (born 1983), Spanish triathlete
- Francisco Javier González (Mexican footballer) (born 1984), Mexican professional football player
- Francisco Javier González-Acuña (contemporary), Mexican mathematician and professor
- Francisco Javier Gutiérrez (born 1973), Spanish fantasy genre filmmaker
- Francisco Javier Hernández Gonzalez (born 1989), Spanish professional football player
- Francisco Javier Illán Vivas (born 1958), Spanish writer and poet
- Francisco Javier Jusué (born 1979), Spanish professional football player
- Francisco Javier Lledó (born 1979), Spanish professional football player
- Francisco Javier López Díaz (born 1988), Spanish professional football player
- Francisco Javier López García (born 1951), Spanish professional football player
- Francisco Javier López Peña (a.k.a. Thierry) (born 1948), Basque separatist leader
- Francisco Javier Mayorga Castañeda (born 1951), Mexican businessman and politician; government minister
- Francisco Javier Mina (1789–1817), Spanish lawyer and army officer and Mexican revolutionary
- Francisco Javier Peral (born 1983), Spanish professional football player
- Francisco Javier Ramírez Acuña (born 1952), Mexican politician; Governor of Jalisco; government minister
- Francisco Javier Rodríguez Vílchez (born 1978), Spanish professional football player
- Francisco Javier Rodríguez (born 1981), Mexican professional football player
- Francisco Javier Salazar Sáenz (contemporary), Mexican politician; government minister
- Francisco Javier Sánchez Broto (born 1971), Spanish professional footballer
- Francisco Javier Torres (born 1983), Mexican professional football player
- Francisco Javier Uría (born 1950), Spanish professional football player
- Francisco Javier Venegas, marqués de la Reunión y de Nueva España (1760–1838), Spanish military officer and viceroy of New Spain 1810–13
- Francisco Javier Vergara y Velasco (1860–1914), Colombian geographer, cartographer, and historian
- Francisco Javier Zaldúa (Francisco Javier Martínez de Zaldúa y Racines) Colombian, lawyer and politician; President of Colombia 1882
- Francisco León Franco (Francisco Javier León Franco) (1832–1880), Ecuadoran politician; vice president and president of Ecuador
- Francisco López Alfaro (Francisco Javier López Alfaro) (born 1962), Spanish professional football player and manager
- Francisco Martínez Marina (Francisco Xavier Martinez Marina) (1754–1833), Spanish jurist, historian. and priest
- Francisco Martos (Francisco Javier Martos Espigares) (born 1984), Spanish professional football player, playing for Greece
- Francisco Meléndez (Francisco Javier Melendez Villegas) (born 1964), Puerto Rican professional baseball player
- Francisco Oliveras (Francisco Javier Oliveras) (born 1963), Puerto Rican professional baseball player
- Francisco Ortiz Franco (Francisco Javier Ortiz Franco) (1954–2004), Mexican journalist; assassinated
- Francisco Prieto (Francisco Javier Prieto) (born 1983), Chilean professional football player
- Francisco Varela (Francisco Javier Varela García) (1946–2001), Chilean biologist, philosopher, and neuroscientist
- Francisco Vargas (Mexican boxer) (Francisco Javier Vargas Peláez) (born 1984), Mexican Olympic boxer
- Francisco Vidal Salinas (Francisco Javier Vidal Salinas) (born 1953), Chilean politician and government minister
- Francisco Villarroya (Francisco Javier Pérez Villaroya) (born 1966), Spanish professional football player
- Francisco Xavier Bogarin (1763–1830), Paraguayan priest involved in the independence movement of Paraguay
- Francisco Xavier Castellanos (born 1953), Bolivian-American physician and neuroscientist
- Francisco Xavier da Silva Pereira, Conde das Antas (1793–1852), Portuguese military officer in the Peninsular War against Napoleon
- Francisco Xavier de Luna Pizarro (1780–1855), Peruvian priest and politician; briefly Interim President of Peru twice in 1822 and 1833
- Francisco Xavier do Amaral (born 1937), East Timorese politician
- Francisco Xavier Sepulveda (1742–1788), Mexican colonial soldier in the early days of Southern California
- Francisco Xavier Villarroya (1734–1768), Jesuit missionary to New Spain
- Francisco Yeste (Francisco Javier Yeste Navarro) (born 1979), Spanish professional football player
- Franciszek Kasparek (Franciszek Ksawery Kasparek) (1844–1903), Polish jurist, professor of law, and rector of Kraków University
- Franciszek Ksawery Branicki (1730–1819), Polish nobleman, magnate, and one of the leaders of the Targowica Confederation
- Franciszek Ksawery Chomiński (died 1809), Polish politician and writer
- Franciszek Ksawery Dmochowski (1762–1818), Polish Romantic novelist, poet, and translator
- Franciszek Ksawery Drucki-Lubecki (1778–1846), Polish prince and government minister
- Franciszek Ksawery Godebski (1801–1869), Polish writer and publicist
- Franciszek Ksawery Lampi (1782–1852), Polish Romantic painter
- Franciszek Ksawery Zachariasiewicz (1770–1845), Polish Roman Catholic bishop of Przemyśl
- Franciszek Latinik (Franciszek Ksawery Latinik) (1864–1949), Polish general officer
- François Baby (legislative councillor) (Charles François Xavier Baby) (1794–1864), Canadian seigneur, businessman, and legislative councillor
- François de Laval (François-Xavier de Montmorency-Laval) (1623–1708), French prelate of the Roman Catholic Church; first bishop of New France
- François de Robiano (François Xavier Jean-Marie de Robiano) (1778–1836), Belgian politician; governor of Antwerp province
- François Roffiaen (Jean François Xavier Roffiaen) (1820–1898), Belgian landscape painter
- François Tourte (François Xavier Tourte) (1747–1835), French watchmaker and archetier of classical instruments
- François-Xavier-Anselme Trudel (1838–1890), Québécois politician
- François-Xavier Archambault (1841–1893), Québécois lawyer and politician
- François-Xavier Babineau (1825–1890), Canadian Catholic priest
- François Xavier Bazin (1824–1865), French archetier; first of the Bazin dynasty
- François-Xavier Bélanger (1833–1882), French Canadian naturalist and museum curator
- François Xavier Bon de Saint Hilaire (1678–1761), president of the Court of Auditors of Montpelier; demonstrated the feasibility of making fabric from spider silk
- François-Xavier Brunet (1868–1922), Canadian Roman Catholic priest and bishop
- François-Xavier de Donnea (François Xavier Gustave Marie Joseph Corneille Hubert) (born 1941), Belgian politician, former mayor of Brussels; government minister
- François-Xavier de Feller (1735–1802), Belgian author
- François Xavier de Schwarz (1762–1826), French cavalry officer during the Revolutionary era
- François-Xavier Dulac (François-Xavier Bonhomme dit Dulac) (1841–1890), Québécois farmer, merchant, and political figure
- François-Xavier Fabre (1766–1837), French painter
- François-Xavier Garneau (1809–1866), French Canadian notary, poet, civil servant, and historian of French Canada
- François-Xavier Larue (1763–1855), Canadian farmer, notary, and political figure in Lower Canada
- François-Xavier Lemieux (Quebec MLA) (1851–1933), Québécois lawyer, judge, and political figure
- François-Xavier Lemieux (1811–1864), French Canadian lawyer and politician
- François-Xavier Malhiot (1781–1854), Canadian merchant, seigneur and political figure in Lower Canada
- François-Xavier-Marc-Antoine de Montesquiou-Fézensac (1757–1832), French politician
- Francois Xavier Martin (1762–1846), American jurist and author; first Attorney General of State of Louisiana; Justice of the Louisiana Supreme Court
- François-Xavier Méthot (1796–1853), Québécois businessman and political figure
- François-Xavier Nzuwonemeye (contemporary), Rwandan soldier, known for his alleged role in the Rwandan Genocide
- François-Xavier Ortoli (1925–2007), French Gaullist politician and businessman
- François-Xavier-Ovide Méthot (1843–1908), Québécois farmer and politician
- François-Xavier Paradis (1844–1910), Canadian politician
- François-Xavier Poizat (born 1989), French classical pianist
- François-Xavier Roth (born 1971), French orchestra conductor
- François-Xavier Tessier (1799–1835), Canadian doctor, publisher, and political figure in Lower Canada
- François-Xavier Verschave (1945–2005), French economist, cofounder of the French NGO Survie
- François-Xavier Villain (born 1950), French politician
- François-Xavier Wurth-Paquet (1801–1885), Luxembourgian politician, jurist, and archaeologist
- Frank Burke (Medal of Honor recipient) (Francis Xavier Burke) (1918–1988), American army officer; recipient of the Medal of Honor
- Frank Castellano, (Francis Xavier Castellano) (contemporary), American naval officer
- Frank Costigan (Francis Xavier Costigan) (1931–2009), Australian lawyer, chairman of the Costigan Commission
- Frank Flood (Francis Xavier Flood) (1901–1921), Irish fighter in the Dublin Active Service Brigade during the Irish War of Independence
- Frank McCloskey (Francis Xavier McCloskey) (1939–2003), American politician from Indiana; U.S. representative
- Frank Reagan (Francis Xavier Reagan) (born 1919), American professional football player
- Frank Richter, Sr. (Francis Xavier Richter), (1837–1910), pioneer settler, miner and rancher in Washington and British Columbia
- Frank Richter, Jr. (Francis Xavier Richter), (1910–1977), Canadian politician from British Columbia
- Frank Shields (Francis Xavier Shields), (1909–1975), American amateur tennis player
- Frank Warfield (Francis Xavier Warfield) (1895–1932), American professional baseball player and manager in the Negro leagues
- Frank X. Schwab (1874–1946), American politician from New York; mayor of Buffalo, New York
- Frankie J (Francisco Javier Bautista, Jr.) (born 1975), Mexican American popular singer
- Frans Seda (Franciscus Xaverius Seda) (1926–2009), Indonesian finance minister under Sukarno and Suharto
- František Xaver Dušek (Franz Xaver Duschek) (1731–1799), Czech composer, harpsichordist, and pianist
- Franz Biebl (Franz Xaver Biebl) (1906–2001), German composer of classical music
- Franz Gruber (Franz Xaver Gruber) (1787–1863), Austrian school teacher and church organist; co-composer of the song “Stille Nacht, heilige Nacht”, (“Silent Night”)
- Franz Schönhuber (Franz Xaver Schönhuber) (1923–2005), German journalist and author
- Franz Xaver Dieringer (1811–1876), German Roman Catholic theologian
- Franz Xaver Feuchtmayer the Younger (born 1735, died unknown), Baroque artist associated with the Wessobrunner School
- Franz Xaver Feuchtmayer (1698–1763), German Baroque stucco plasterer of the Wessobrunner School
- Franz Xaver Fieber (1807–1872), German botanist and entomologist
- Franz Xaver Gabelsberger (1789–1849), German inventor of a shorthand writing system named Gabelsberger shorthand
- Franz Xaver Gebel (1787–1843), German composer, music teacher, and conductor
- Franz Xaver Gerl (1764–1827), Bavarian bass singer and composer of the Classical era
- Franz Xaver Haberl (1840–1910), German musicologist
- Franz Xaver Hammer (1741–1817), German gambist, cellist, and composer
- Franz Xaver Josef von Unertl (1675–1750), Bavarian politician
- Franz Xaver Kraus (1840–1901), German Catholic priest and art historian
- Franz Xaver Kroetz (born 1946), German German author, playwright, actor, and film director
- Franz Xaver Kugler (1862–1929), German chemist, mathematician, Assyriologist, and Jesuit priest
- Franz Xaver Messerschmidt (1736–1783), German-Austrian sculptor
- Franz Xaver Murschhauser (1663–1738), German composer and music theorist
- Franz Xaver Nagl (1855–1913), Cardinal of the Roman Catholic Church and Archbishop of Vienna
- Franz Xaver Neruda (1843–1915), Moravian-born Danish cellist and composer
- Franz Xaver Niemetschek (1766–1849), Czech philosopher, teacher, and music critic
- Franz Xaver Reimspiess (1900–1979), Austrian mechanical engineer
- Franz Xaver Reithmayr (1809–1872), German Catholic theologian and exegete
- Franz Xaver Richter (1709–1789), Moravian composer
- Franz Xaver Riepl (1790–1847), Austrian geologist, and railway and metallurgical specialist
- Franz Xaver Schmid (Franz Xaver Schmid-Schwarzenberg) (1819–1883), Austrian-German educator and philosopher
- Franz Xaver Schwarz (1875–1947), German politician who served as Reichsschatzmeister (National Treasurer) of the Nazi Party
- Franz Xaver Süssmayr (1766–1803), Austrian composer
- Franz Xaver von Baader (1765–1841), German Roman Catholic philosopher and theologian
- Franz Xaver von Funk (1840–1907), German Catholic theologian
- Franz Xaver von Hertling (1780–1844), Bavarian lieutenant general and War Minister 1836–38
- Franz Xaver von Linsenmann (1835–1898), German Catholic moral theologian
- Franz Xaver von Wulfen (1728–1805), Austrian botanist, mineralogist, alpinist, and Jesuit priest
- Franz Xaver von Zach (1754–1832), Hungarian-born German astronomer
- Franz Xaver Wagenschön (1726–1790), Czech-Austrian painter of the Rococo and Neoclassical styles
- Franz Xaver Winterhalter (1805–1873), German painter and lithographer
- Franz Xaver Witt (1834–1888), Bavarian Catholic priest, church musician, and composer
- Franz Xaver Wolfgang Mozart (1791–1844), German composer, pianist, and conductor; son of Wolfgang Amadeus Mozart
- Franz Xavier Wernz (1842–1914), German Superior General of the Society of Jesus
- Frédéric-François-Xavier Ghislain de Mérode (1820–1874), Belgian prelate, archbishop and statesman of the Papal states
- Georges-François-Xavier-Marie Grente (1872–1959), French Cardinal of the Roman Catholic Church
- Henri François Xavier de Belsunce de Castelmoron (1671–1755), French Jesuit priest; Bishop of Marseille
- Henri François Xavier Gresley (1819–1890), French Minister of War 1878–79
- Infante Anthony of Portugal (António Francisco Xavier Benedito Teodósio Leopoldo Henrique) (1695–1757), Portuguese infante
- Infante Antonio Pascual of Spain (Antonio Pascual Francisco Javier Juan Nepomuceno Aniello Raimundo Silvestre de Borbón y Sajonia) (1755–1817), Infante of Spain
- J. F. X. O'Brien (James Francis Xavier O'Brien) (1828–1905), Irish nationalist Fenian revolutionary
- Xavi Pérez (Francisco Javier Pérez Pérez) (born 1984), Spanish professional football player
- Javi Ruiz (Francisco Javier Ruiz Bonilla) (born 1980), Spanish professional football player
- Javier Aramendia (Francisco Javier Aramendia Llorente) (born 1986), Spanish road bicycle racer
- Javier Bosma (Francisco Javier Bosma Mínguez) (born 1969), Spanish Olympic beach volleyball player
- Javier Casquero (Francisco Javier Casquero Paredes) (born 1976), Spanish professional football player
- Javier Castillejo (Francisco Javier Castillejo) (born 1968), Spanish professional boxer
- Javier Chica (Francisco Javier Chica Torres) (born 1985), Spanish professional football player
- Javier de Burgos (Francisco Javier de Burgos y del Olmo) (1778–1849), Spanish jurist, politician, journalist, and translator
- Javier de Pedro (Francisco Javier de Pedro Falque) (born 1973), Spanish professional football player
- Javier Farinós (Francisco Javier Farinós Zapata) (born 1978), Spanish professional football player
- Javier Garciadiego (Francisco Javier Garciadiego Dantán) (born 1951), Mexican historian
- Javier Mendiburu (Francisco Javier Mendiburu Urgell) (born 1980), Spanish professional basketball player
- Javier Navarro (Francisco Javier Vicente Navarro) (born 1974), Spanish professional football player
- Javier Ruibal (Francisco Javier Ruibal de Flores Calero) (born 1955), Spanish musician and songwriter
- Javier Rupérez (Francisco Javier Rupérez Rubio) (born 1941), Spanish politician, diplomat, and writer
- Javier Solana (Francisco Javier Solana de Madariaga) (born 1942), Spanish diplomat; Secretary General of NATO from 1995 to 1999
- Javier Tarantino (Francisco Javier Tarantino Uriarte) (born 1984), Spanish professional football player
- Javier Urruticoechea (Francisco Javier González Urruticoechea) (1952–2001), Spanish Basque professional football player
- Javier Yubero (Francisco Javier Yubero Solanilla) (1972–2005), Spanish professional football player
- Johann Franz Xaver Sterkel (1750–1817), German composer and pianist
- Johannes von Nepomuk Franz Xaver Gistel (1809–1873), German naturalist
- John VI of Portugal (João Maria José Francisco Xavier de Paula Luís António Domingos Rafael de Bragança) (1767–1826), King of the United Kingdom of Portugal, Brazil and the Algarves
- John Davoren (John Francis Xavier Davoren) (1915–1997), American politician from Massachusetts
- Joseph Droz (François-Xavier-Joseph Droz) (1773–1850), French writer on ethics, political science and, political economy
- Kriengsak Kovitvanit (Francis Xavier Kriengsak Kovitvanit ) (born 1949), Archbishop of Bangkok
- Ksawery Lubomirski (Franciszek Ksawery Lubomirski) (1747–1829), Polish nobleman and Russian general
- Liam Pickering (Liam Francis Xavier Pickering) (born 1968), Australian rules footballer
- Lorenzo Maria of Saint Francis Xavier (1782–1856), Italian priest of the Roman Catholic Church; beatified by Pope John Paul II in 1999
- Louis Joseph, Dauphin of France (Louis Joseph Xavier François of France) (1781–1789), son of King Louis XVI of France and Marie Antoinette; heir apparent to the French throne
- Marie François Xavier Bichat (1771–1802), French anatomist and physiologist
- Mary Francis Xavier Warde (1810–1884), Irish nun of the Sisters of Mercy
- Moose Goheen (Francis Xavier Goheen) (1894–1979), American amateur ice hockey player
- Nguyen Van Thuan (François-Xavier Nguyễn Văn Thuận) (1928–2002), Vietnamese Cardinal of the Roman Catholic Church
- Paco Clos (Francisco Javier Clos Orozco) (born 1960), Spanish professional football player
- Paco Vidarte (Francisco Javier Vidarte Fernández) (1970–2008), Spanish philosopher, writer, and LGBT activist
- Pantera (wrestler) (Francisco Javier Pozas) (born 1964), Mexican professional wrestler
- Patxi Vila (Francisco Javier Vila Errandonea) (born 1975), Spanish Basque professional bicycle road racer
- Pierre François Xavier de Charlevoix (1682–1761), French Jesuit traveller and historian; first historian of New France
- Pierre François Xavier de Ram (1804–1865), Belgian Roman Catholic prelate and historian
- Pope Pius VIII (Francesco Saverio Castiglioni) (1761–1830)
- Prince Francis Xavier of Saxony (1730–1806), German prince and member of the House of Wettin
- Prince Friedrich Franz Xaver of Hohenzollern-Hechingen (1757–1844), Austrian military general
- Regis Philbin (Regis Francis Xavier Philbin) (born 1931), American television personality
- Sugi Sito (Francisco Javier Mar Hernández) (1926–2000), Mexican professional wrestler
- Thomas F. X. Smith (1928–1996), American reformist politician and author; mayor of Jersey City, New Jersey
- Tommaso Traetta (Tommaso Michele Francesco Saverio Traetta) (1729–1779), Italian composer
- Xabier Azkargorta (Francisco Xabier Azcargorta Uriarte) (born 1953), Spanish professional football player and manager
- Xaver Scharwenka (Franz Xaver Scharwenka) (1850–1924), Polish-German pianist, composer, and teacher
- Xavier Atencio (Francis Xavier Atencio) (born 1919), animator and Imagineer for The Walt Disney Company
- Xavier Connor (Francis Xavier Connor) (1917–2005), Australian jurist
- Xavier Dirceu (Dirceu Francisco Xavier) (born 1977), Brazilian professional football player
- Xavier, Duke of Parma (Francis Xavier, Duke of Parma and Piacenza) (1889–1977)
- Xavier Haegy (François Xavier Haegy) (1870–1932), Alsatian priest, journalist, and politician
- Xavier Hernandez (baseball) (Francis Xavier Hernandez) (The X-Man) (born 1965), American professional baseball player
- Xavier Roca Mateo (Francesc Xavier Roca Mateo) (born 1974), Spanish professional football player
- Xisco (footballer born 1980) (Francisco Javier Muñoz Llompart) (born 1980), Spanish professional football player
- Xisco Campos (Francisco Javier Campos Coll) (born 1982), Spanish professional football player

== Fictional persons ==
- Frank Pembleton (Francis Xavier Pembleton), character on the television series Homicide: Life on the Street
- Professor X, (Professor Charles Francis Xavier), Marvel Comics superhero
- Trapper John McIntyre (John Francis Xavier McIntyre), character of the novels, film, and television series M*A*S*H

== See also ==
- St. Francis Xavier (disambiguation)
- St. Francis Xavier Church (disambiguation)
- St. Xavier (disambiguation)
- San Javier (disambiguation)
- Xavier (disambiguation)
