= Franciszek =

Franciszek (Polish: [fraɲˈt͡ɕiʂɛk]) is a masculine given name of Polish origin (female form Franciszka). It is a cognate of Francis, Francisco, François, and Franz. People with the name include:

- Edward Pfeiffer (Franciszek Edward Pfeiffer) (1895–1964), Polish general officer; recipient of the Order of Virtuti Militari
- Franciszek Alter (1889–1945), Polish general officer during WWII
- Franciszek and Magdalena Banasiewicz (fl. mid-20th century), Polish couple who hid and rescued 15 Jews during the Holocaust
- Franciszek Antoni Kwilecki (1725–1794), Polish nobleman, statesman, and ambassador
- Franciszek Armiński (1789–1848), Polish astronomer
- Franciszek Bieliński (1683–1766), Polish politician and statesman
- Franciszek Blachnicki (1921–1987), Polish man who started The Light-Life Movement (Światło-Zycie) as a Catholic association
- Franciszek Błażej (1907–1951), Polish military officer and anticommunist resistance fighter
- Franciszek Bohomolec (1720–1784), Polish dramatist, linguist, and theatrical reformer
- Franciszek Bronikowski (1906–1964), Polish Olympic rower
- Franciszek Bukaty (1747–1797), Polish diplomat
- Franciszek Cebulak (1906–1960), Polish Olympic football (soccer) player
- Franciszek Chalupka (1856–1909), Polish theologian; founder of the first Polish-American parishes in New England
- Franciszek Czapek (1811–unknown), Czech-Polish watchmaker
- Franciszek Dionizy Kniaźnin (1750–1807), Polish poet of the Enlightenment period
- Franciszek Dobrowolski (1830–1896), Polish theater director
- Franciszek Ferdynant Lubomirski (1710–1774), Polish nobleman and Knight of the Order of the White Eagle
- Franciszek Fiszer (1860–1937), Polish bon vivant, gourmand, erudite, and philosopher
- Franciszek Gągor (1951–2010), Polish general officer, Chief of the General Staff of the Polish Army since 2006
- Franciszek Gajowniczek (1901–1995), Polish army sergeant whose life was spared when Saint Maximilian Kolbe sacrificed his life for Gajowniczek at Auschwitz
- Franciszek Gąsienica Groń (1931–2014), Polish Olympic skier
- Franciszek Gąsior (1947–2021), Polish Olympic handball player
- Franciszek Grocholski (1730–1792), Polish nobleman and politician
- Franciszek Gruszka (1910–1940), Polish aviator who flew with the RAF during the Battle of Britain
- Franciszek Hodur (1866–1953), Polish prelate of the Polish National Catholic Church
- Franciszek Jamroż (contemporary), Polish politician, former mayor of Gdańsk; imprisoned for corruption and bribery
- Franciszek Jarecki (1931–2010), Polish Air Force aviator who defected to the West with a MIG-15 in 1953
- Franciszek Jerzy Jaskulski (1913–1947), Polish soldier and commander in the anticommunist Freedom and Independence organization
- Franciszek Kamieński (1851–1912), Polish botanist
- Franciszek Kamiński (1902–2000), Polish general and activist of the peasant movement
- Franciszek Kareu (1731–1802), Belarusian Jesuit priest; Superior General of the Society of Jesus 1801–02
- Franciszek Karpiński (1741–1825), Polish poet of the Age of Enlightenment
- Franciszek Kasparek (1844–1903), Polish jurist, professor of law, and rector of Kraków University
- Franciszek Kleeberg (1888–1941), Polish general officer in the Austro-Hungarian army and subsequently in the Polish Legions
- Franciszek Kniaźnin (1750–1807), Polish dramatist and writer
- Franciszek Kokot (1929–2021), Polish nephrologist and endocrinologist
- Franciszek Kostrzewski (1826–1911), Polish painter, illustrator, and caricaturist
- Franciszek Krajowski (1861–1932), Czech-Polish military officer and general of the Polish Army
- Franciszek Krupiński (1836–1898), Polish philosopher
- Franciszek Ksawery Branicki (1730–1819), Polish nobleman, magnate, and a leader of the Targowica Confederation
- Franciszek Ksawery Chomiński (died 1809), Polish politician, writer, and translator
- Franciszek Ksawery Dmochowski (1762–1818), Polish Romantic novelist, poet, translator, and satirist
- Franciszek Ksawery Drucki-Lubecki (1778–1846), Polish politician and government minister in partitioned Poland
- Franciszek Ksawery Godebski (1801–1869), Polish writer and publicist
- Franciszek Ksawery Lampi (1782–1852), Polish painter of the Romantic era
- Franciszek Ksawery Zachariasiewicz (1770–1845), Polish Roman Catholic prelate, professor, and historian
- Franciszek Latinik (1864–1949), Polish general officer
- Franciszek Leja (1885–1979), Polish mathematician
- Franciszek Lessel (1780–1838), Polish composer
- Franciszek Lilius (1600–1657), Polish composer
- Franciszek Lubomirski (died 1721), Polish nobleman
- Franciszek Macharski (1927–2016), Polish Roman Catholic cardinal; Archbishop of Kraków 1978–2005
- Franciszek Maksymilian Ossoliński (1676–1756), Polish nobleman, politician, collector, and patron of arts
- Franciszek Malewski (1800–1870), Polish lawyer, archivist, and journalist
- Franciszek Misztal (1901–1981), Polish aircraft designer
- Franciszek Niepokólczycki (1900–1974), Polish military officer and anticommunist resistance fighter; imprisoned under Stalin
- Franciszek Nowicki (1864–1935), Polish poet, mountaineer, and socialist activist
- Franciszek Pieczka (1928–2022), Polish film and stage actor
- Franciszek Piper (born 1941), Polish scholar, historian and author; specializing in the Holocaust
- Franciszek Pius Radziwiłł (1878–1944), Polish nobleman and political activist
- Franciszek Pokorny (fl. mid-20th century), Polish military officer and cryptographer
- Franciszek Przysiężniak (1909–1975), Polish military officer and anticommunist resistance fighter; recipient of the Virtuti Militari
- Franciszek Rychnowski (1850–1929), Polish engineer and an inventor
- Franciszek Salezy Dmochowski (1801–1871), Polish writer, poet, translator, critic, and journalist
- Franciszek Salezy Jezierski (1740–1791), Polish priest, writer, and activist of the Enlightenment period
- Franciszek Salezy Potocki (1700–1772), Polish-Lithuanian nobleman; Knight of the Order of the White Eagle
- Franciszek Sebastian Lubomirski (diet 1699), Polish nobleman
- Franciszek Siarczyński (1758–1829), Polish Roman Catholic Piarist priest, historian, geographer, teacher, and writer
- Franciszek Smuda (1948–2024), Polish professional football player, coach, and manager
- Franciszek Smuglewicz (1745–1807), Polish-Lithuanian draftsman and painter
- Franciszek Starowieyski (1930–2009), Polish artist
- Franciszek Stefaniuk (born 1944), Polish politician from Chełm
- Franciszek Sulik (1908–2000), Polish-Australian chess master
- Franciszek Szymczyk (1892–1976), Polish Olympic track cyclist
- Franciszek Trąbalski (1870–1964), Polish socialist politician
- Franciszek Trześniewski (died 1939), Polish gourmand and chef; eponym of the Trześniewski restaurant in Vienna
- Franciszek Walicki (1920–2015), Polish jazz and rock musician
- Franciszek Wielopolski (died 1732), Polish nobleman
- Franciszek Wład (1888–1939), Polish general officer killed during the German invasion of Poland
- Franciszek Wójcicki (1900–1983), Polish politician
- Franciszek Zabłocki (1754–1821), Polish comic dramatist and satirist of the Enlightenment period
- Franciszek Zachara (1898–1966), Polish-American pianist and composer
- Franciszek Ziejka (1940–2020), Polish scholar
- Franciszek Żmurko (1859–1910), Polish painter
- Franciszek Żwirko (1895–1932), Polish sport and military aviator
- Ksawery Lubomirski (Franciszek Ksawery Lubomirski) (1747–1829), Polish nobleman and Russian general officer
