= Ksawery =

Ksawery is a Polish given name version of name Xavier, other variation is Xawery, may refer to:

== People ==
- Ksawery Błasiak (1900–1966), lieutenant of the Polish Army
- Ksawery Jasieński (born 1931), Polish radio speaker, voice actor
- Ksawery Liske (1838–1891), Polish historian, a founder of the Lwów's historical school
- Ksawery Lubomirski (1747–1819), Polish noble, general
- Ksawery Pruszyński (1907–1950), journalist, publicist, writer and diplomat
- Ksawery Tartakower (1887–1956), Polish and French chess player
- Ksawery Szlenkier (born 1981), Polish actor
- Ksawery Wyrożemski (1915–1967), Polish fighter pilot
- Ksawery Zakrzewski (1876–1915), Polish physician
- Adam Franciszek Ksawery Rostkowski (1660–1738), Polish Roman Catholic bishop
- Franciszek Ksawery Branicki (1730–1819), Polish nobleman, magnate, French count
- Franciszek Ksawery Chomiński (1730–1809), Polish soldier, politician, translator and poet
- Franciszek Ksawery Dmochowski (1762–1818), Polish Romantic novelist, poet
- Franciszek Ksawery Drucki-Lubecki (1778–1846), Polish politician, freemason and diplomat
- Franciszek Ksawery Godebski (1801–1869), Polish writer and journalist
- Franciszek Ksawery Lampi (1782–1852), Polish Romantic painter
- Franciszek Ksawery Latinik (1864–1949), Polish military officer
- Franciszek Ksawery Matejko (1793–1860), musician, father of Polish painter Jan Matejko
- Franciszek Ksawery Niesiołowski (1771–1845), Polish general in the Kościuszko Uprising
- Franciszek Ksawery Wierzchleyski (1803–1884), Polish Roman Catholic archbishop
- Franciszek Ksawery Zachariasiewicz (1770–1845), Polish Roman Catholic bishop
- Jan Ksawery Kaniewski (1805–1867), Polish painter
- Józef Ksawery Elsner (1769–1854), Polish composer
- Paweł Ksawery Brzostowski (1739-1827), Polish noble, writer, publicist
- Włodzimierz Ksawery Dzieduszycki (1825–1899), Polish noble, political activist

== Places ==
- Ksawery, Kuyavian-Pomeranian Voivodeship, Poland
