= Imperial Carriage Museum =

Museum of carriages and associated objects

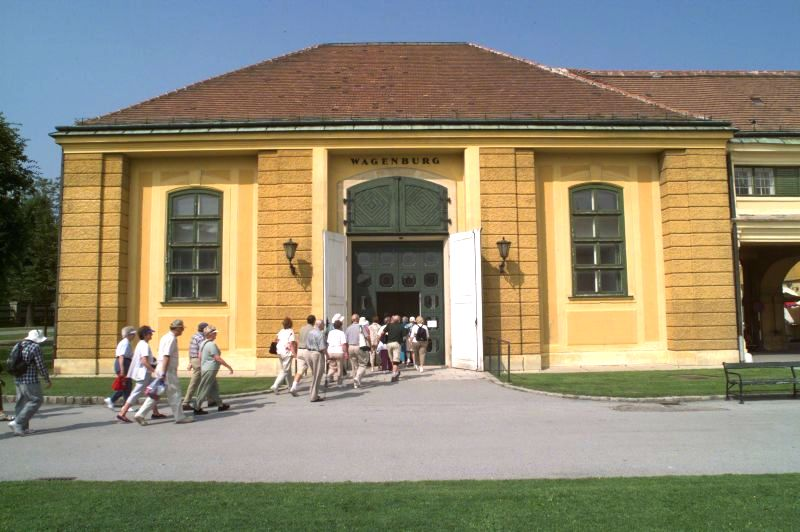
- Entrance to the Imperial Carriage Museum at Schönbrunn Palace
- Interactive fullscreen map
- Location: Vienna
- Coordinates: 48°11′12″N 16°18′34″E

The Imperial Carriage Museum (German: Kaiserliche Wagenburg) is a museum of carriages and vehicles used by the imperial household of the Holy Roman Empire, the Austrian Empire and Austria-Hungary. It is housed in the grounds of the Schloss Schönbrunn in the Hietzing district of Vienna and is a department of the Kunsthistorisches Museum.

The historic name Wagenburg derives from a form of fortification.

== History ==
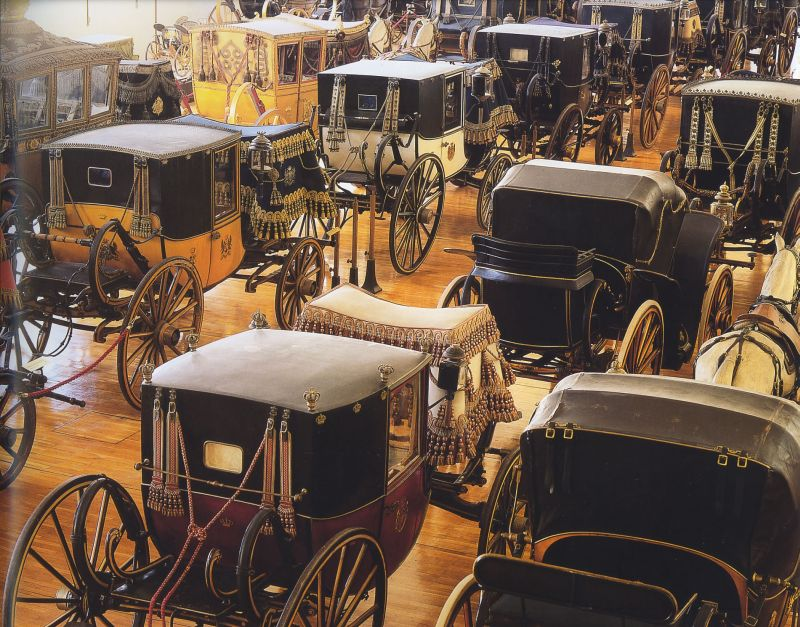
Carriages inside the museum

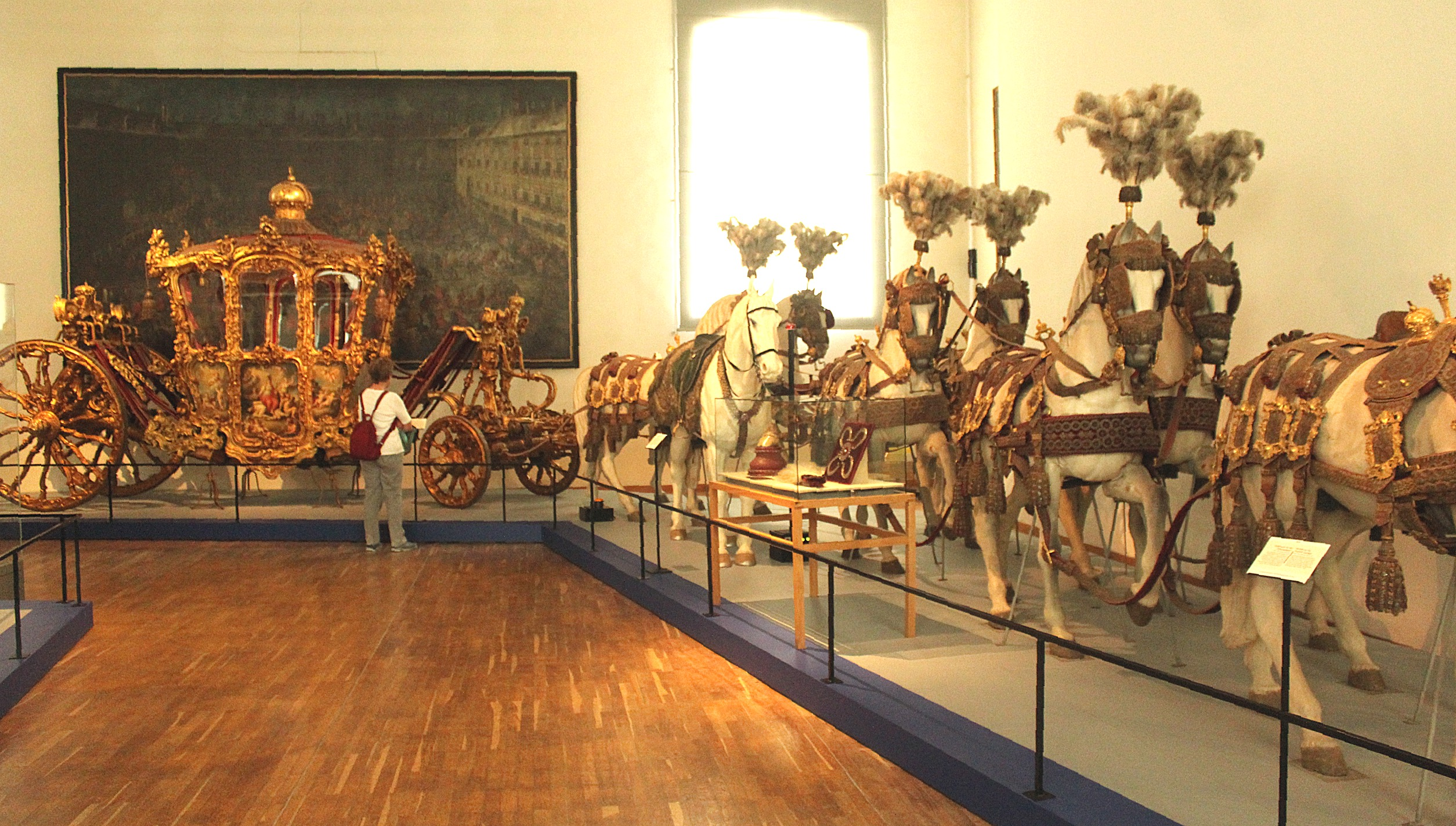
Imperial Coach

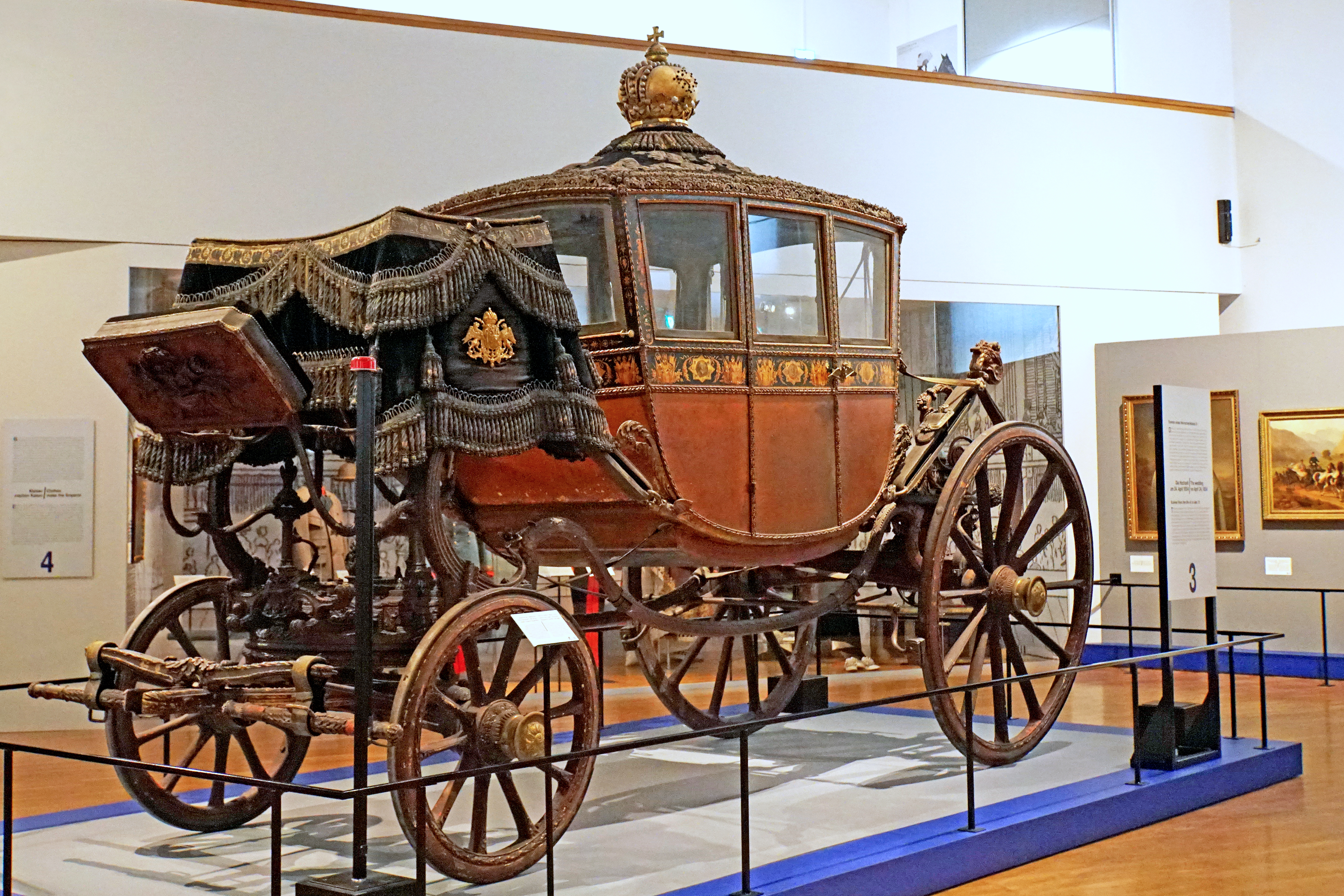
Milan Coronation Coach used by Napoleon and later Empress Elisabeth

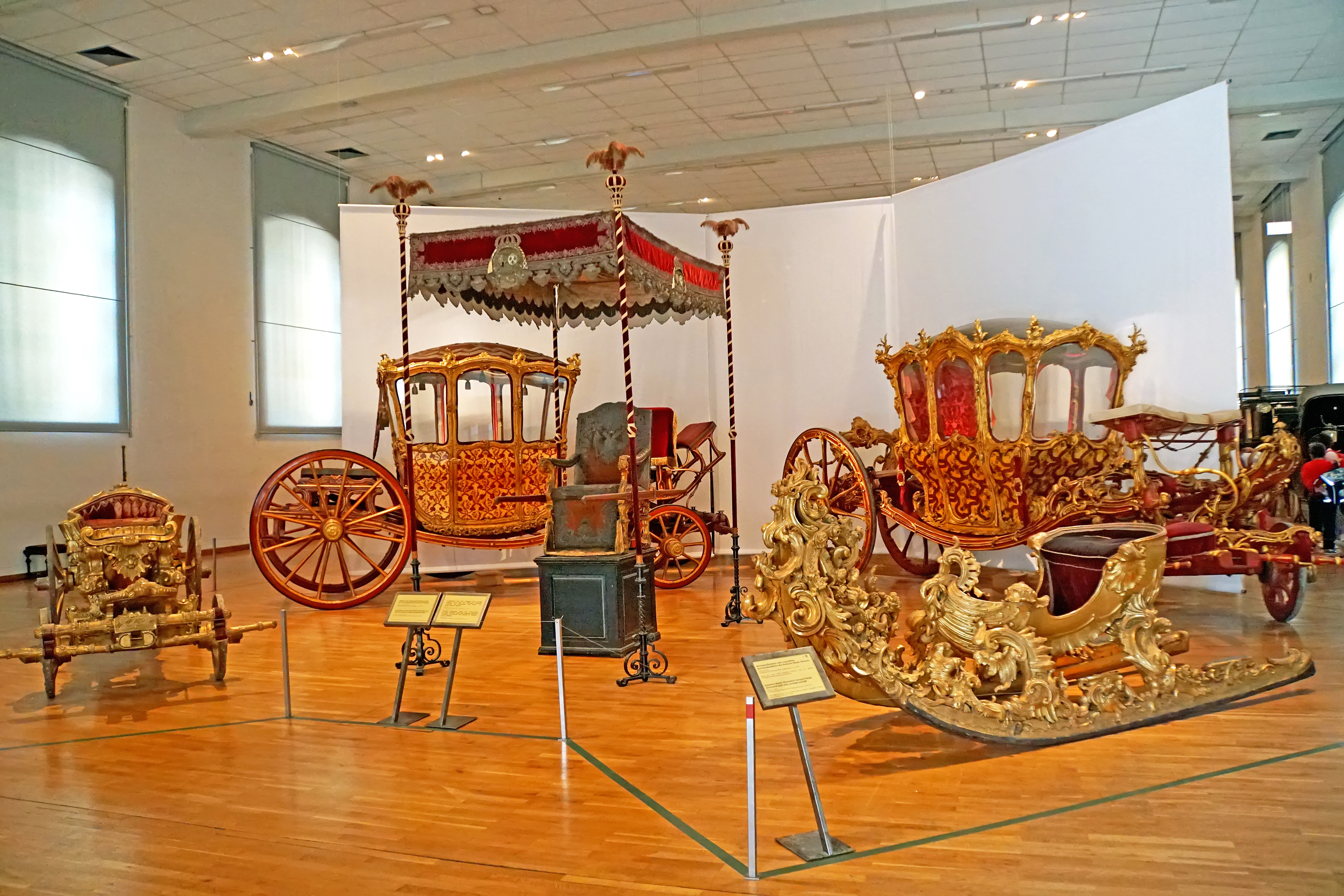
Various coaches, sleds, and a portable throne with a baldachin

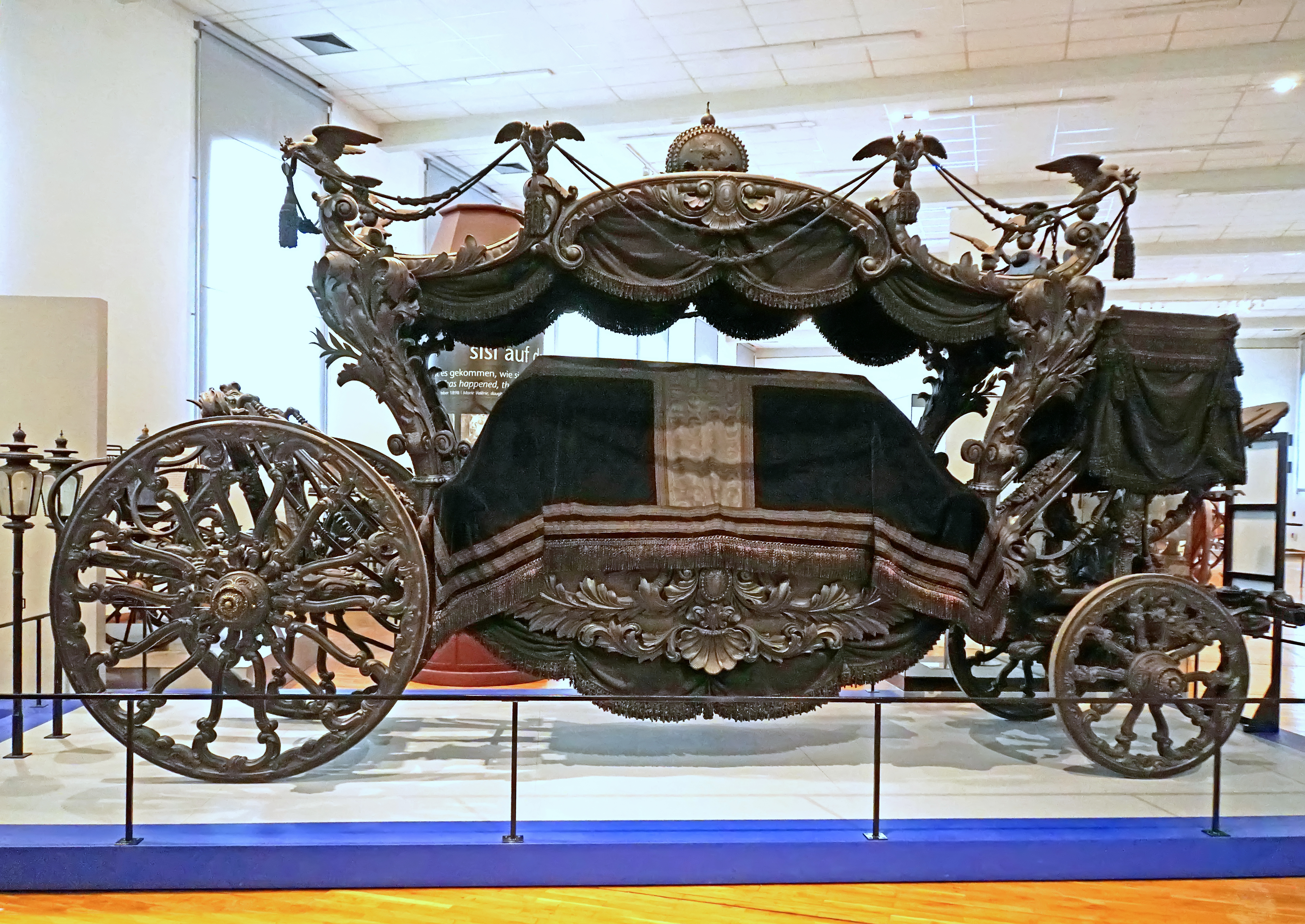
Black Hearse, last used in 1989 for the funeral of Empress Zita

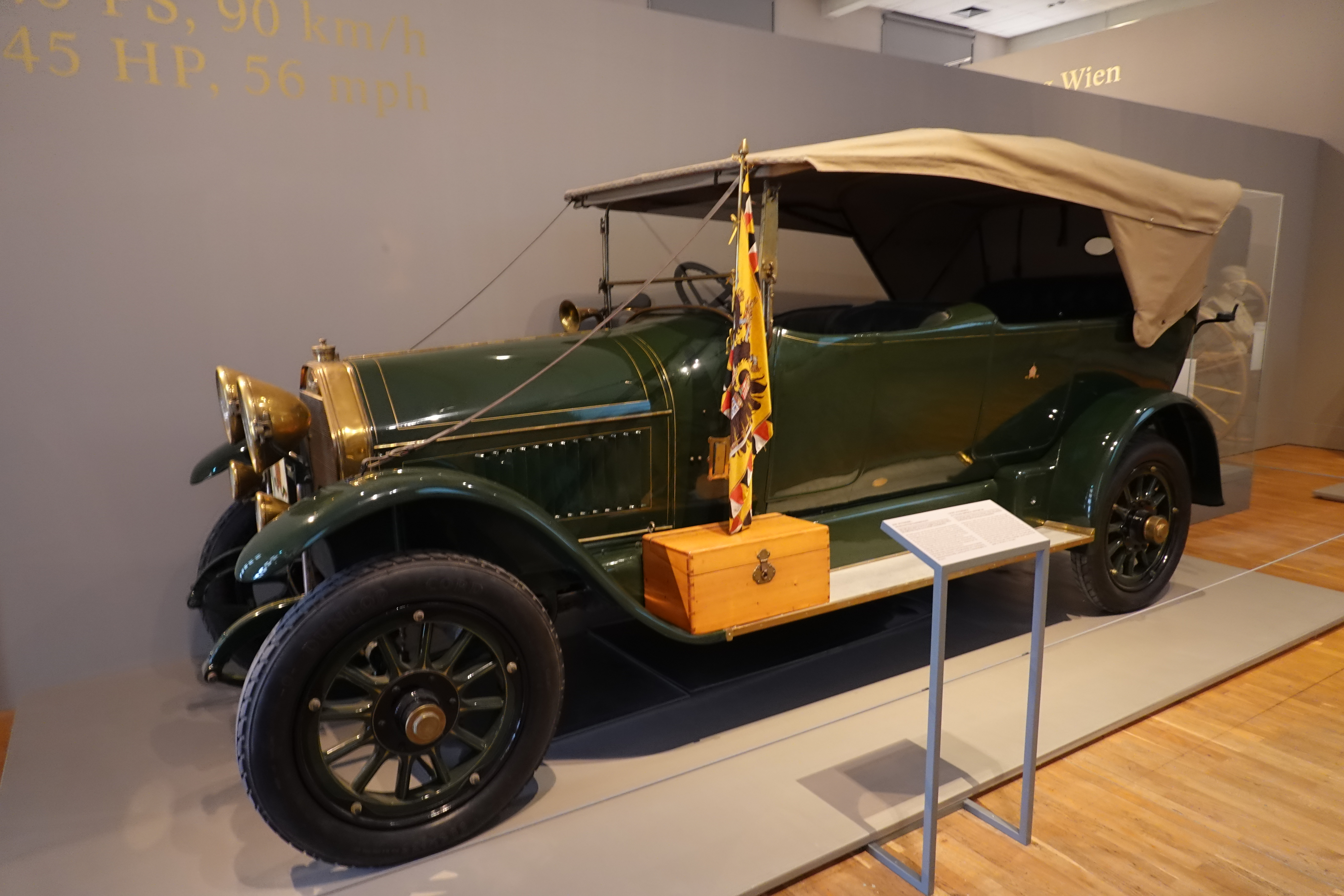
Gräf & Stift 40/45 PS Imperial Car

Towards the end of the Austro-Hungarian Monarchy, the Imperial and Royal Court Carriage House, housed in the Imperial Court Stables (today the MuseumsQuartier), comprised around 640 vehicles of various types. They were used for the daily transport of several hundred people and numerous goods and objects required by the Court. The administration of the vehicles was the responsibility of the Oberststallmeisteramt, whose staff consisted of around 500 people. The inventory of the Habsburg stables also included the Imperial Saddle Room.

Not only the emperor and his family were entitled to the use of court carriages, but also the dignitaries and servants, right down to the court actors and the noble boys. Accordingly, the spectrum of vehicles was wide, ranging from baroque ostentatious carriages to gala, leisure and everyday carriages of the 19th and early 20th centuries to simple transport vehicles or modern automobiles.

With the collapse of the Austro-Hungarian monarchy, the imperial fleet lost its previous function. After 1918, some of the carriages continued to be used by the officials of the newly founded Republic of Austria; some vehicles had to be given to the other successor states, while others were sold to private individuals to fill the empty state coffers. The majority of the vehicles, however, were transferred to a commercial transport company, the Bundes-Fuhrwerksbetrieb. The numerous Victoria, Mylord and Coupé carriages, which were used by the members of the court in everyday life and were thus a characteristic part of the Viennese street scene, were lost as a result—as was the stock of utility and work vehicles.

After the dissolution of the Oberststallmeisteramt in 1922, a remnant of the court vehicle fleet, which was considered historically significant and therefore worth preserving, was handed over to the Kunsthistorisches Museum (KHM) together with some examples of modern carriage construction and the associated harnesses and liveries. Initially, 90 vehicles were involved, with a few more added in later years. In addition, there were other stocks from the tack room, such as riding saddles, horse blankets and the like (Monturdepot). Also in 1922, the carriages given to the museum had to leave their traditional place in the Hofstallungen, as these premises were now rented to the Wiener Messe AG, which called the building the Messepalast for decades.

As there were no sufficiently large halls available in the Hofburg area, the objects were moved to the former Winter Riding School at Schönbrunn Palace. In 1947, the Carriage Museum was separated from the Directorate of the Weapons Collection (now the Imperial Armoury) of the KHM, to which it had been subordinate since 1922, and established as an independent collection of the Kunsthistorisches Museum with its own directorate, scientific staff and restorers.

In November 2001, the last surviving court automobile, the later Kaiserwagen built in 1914 by the Austrian company Gräf & Stift, returned to the collection on permanent loan from its former producer. Emperor Karl I had taken it to Switzerland by train when he left republican German Austria in March 1919; later Gräf & Stift had bought it back at auction.

In 2007, Gloria von Thurn und Taxis lent 17 of her carriages and coaches to the museum.

== The collection ==
The Carriage Museum houses over 5,000 objects, most of which date from the Baroque period to the end of the Austro-Hungarian Empire. Of the 161 carriages or carrying devices in the Wagenburg, 101 come from the stables of the Viennese court and 50 from the fleets of Austrian aristocratic houses. Around 60 vehicles are on display in the Carriage Museum's show halls. The collection is divided into the following groups:

- Carriages
  - Gala carriages (imperial coaches, coronation carriages, gala berlines, carousel carriages (Note: Referring to early modern court carousels—equestrian pageants with allegorical processions), hearses)
  - Everyday carriages (city carriages, touring carriages)
  - Leisure carriages (park carriages, owner-driven carriages, hunting vehicles, children's carriages)
  - Commercial vehicles (horse-training vehicles, farm wagons, fire-fighting vehicles)
- Sleighs
- Sedan chairs, carrying chairs
- Automobiles
- Harnesses, saddles, saddle pads
- Paintings and graphics

Below is a list of highlights of the museum:

- the gilded "Imperial Coach,"
- the Golden Carousel Carriage of Maria Theresia,
- the Child's Phaeton of Napoleon’s son,
- the Black Hearse of the Viennese Court,
- the personal Landaulet of Empress Elisabeth and
- the only preserved court automobile of 1914 by Gräf & Stift
