= Litíč =

- Municipality
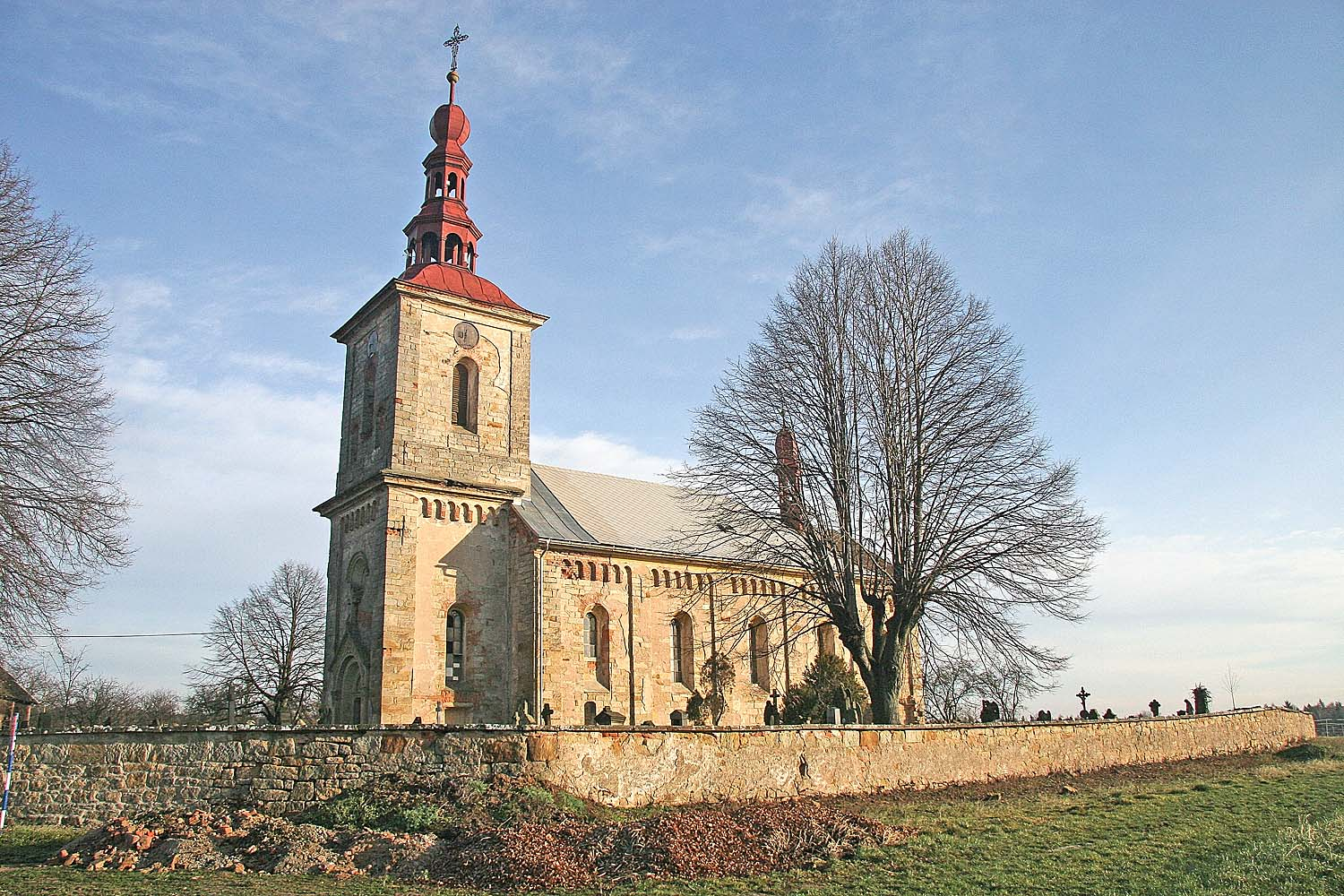
- Church of the Holy Trinity

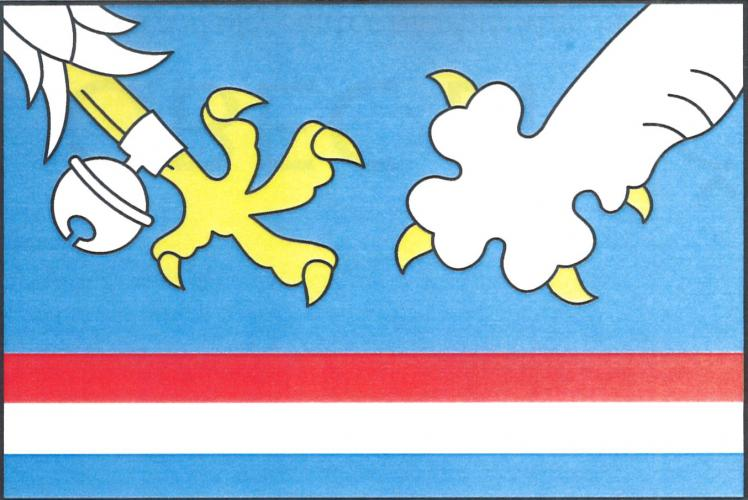
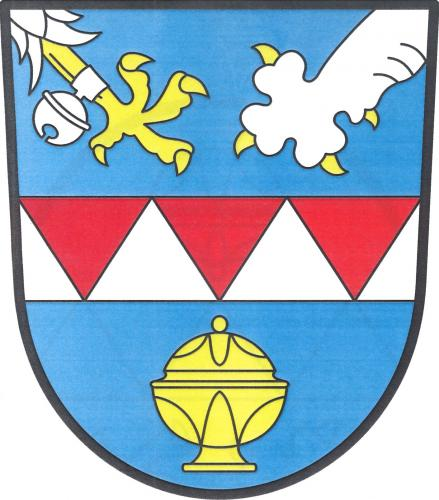
- Flag Coat of arms

- Location in the Czech Republic
- Coordinates: 50°22′31″N 15°50′54″E
- Country: Czech Republic
- Region: Hradec Králové
- District: Trutnov
- First mentioned: 1527

Area
  - Total: 4.52 km^{2} (1.75 sq mi)
- Elevation: 326 m (1,070 ft)

Population (2026-01-01)
  - Total: 199
  - Density: 44.0/km^{2} (114/sq mi)
- Time zone: UTC+1 (CET)
  - Summer (DST): UTC+2 (CEST)
- Postal code: 544 01
- Website: www.litic.cz

Litíč (German: Littitsch) is a municipality and village in Trutnov District in the Hradec Králové Region of the Czech Republic. It has about 200 inhabitants.

== Administrative division ==
Litíč consists of two municipal parts (in brackets population according to the 2021 census):

- Litíč (113)
- Nouzov (64)

== Demographics ==
Historical population
Year	Pop.	±%
1869	616	—
1880	611	−0.8%
1890	534	−12.6%
1900	461	−13.7%
1910	427	−7.4%
1921	413	−3.3%
1930	392	−5.1%
1950	281	−28.3%
1961	248	−11.7%
1970	183	−26.2%
1980	128	−30.1%
1991	89	−30.5%
2001	109	+22.5%
2011	137	+25.7%
2021	177	+29.2%
Source: Censuses

== Notable people ==
- Franz Xaver Wagenschön (1726–1790), German painter
