= Imperial Coach =

Gilded state coach of Austria

- Imperialwagen (German)
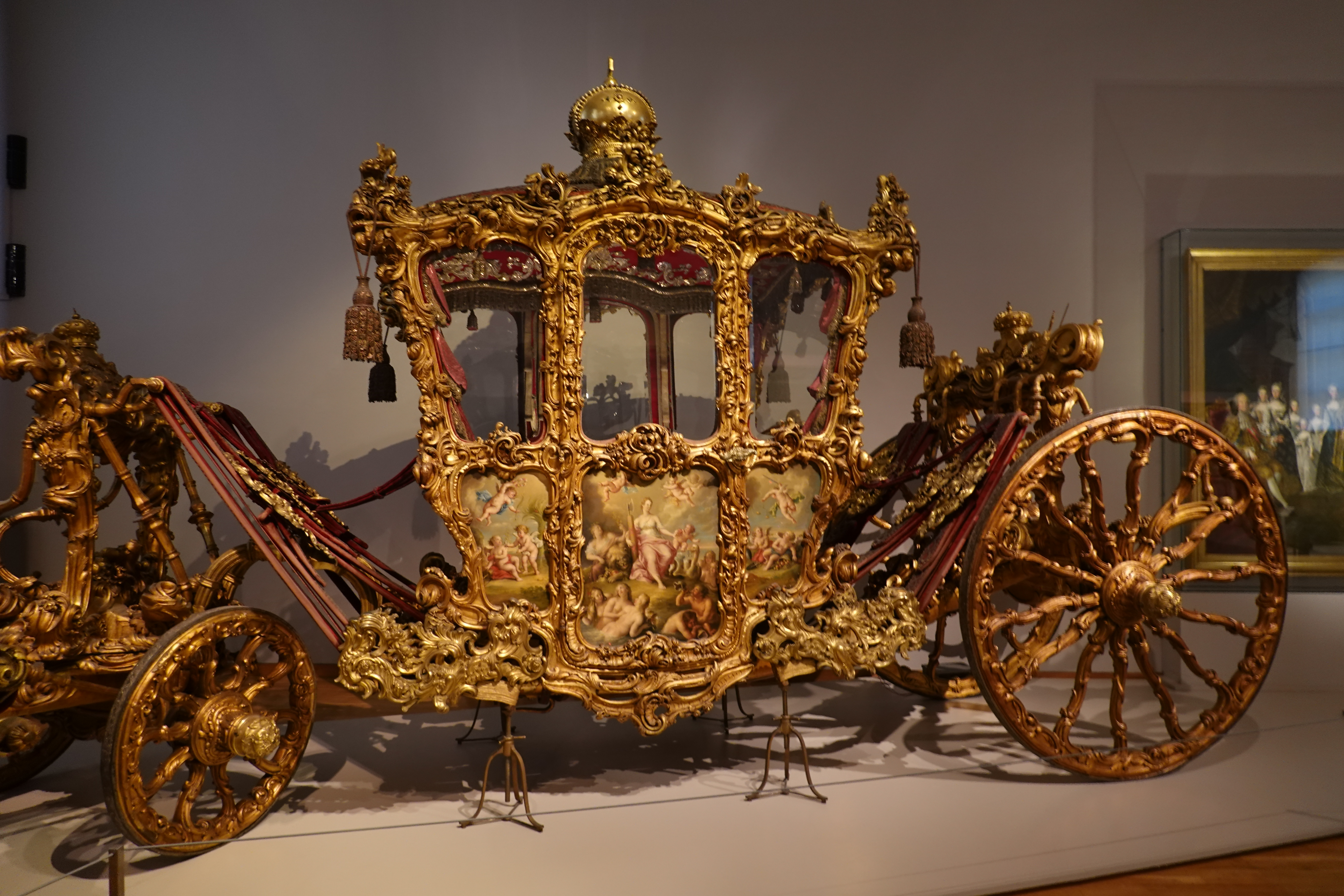
- Artist: Franz Xaver Wagenschön (painted panels, signed 1763)
- Completion date: circa 1735-1740
- Type: Baroque French grand carrosse
- Dimensions: 3.55 m × 2.12 m × 6.77 m (11.6 ft × 7.0 ft × 22.2 ft)
- Weight: 4 tonnes
- Condition: Conserved
- Location: Imperial Carriage Museum; Vienna, Austria
- Owner: Republic of Austria

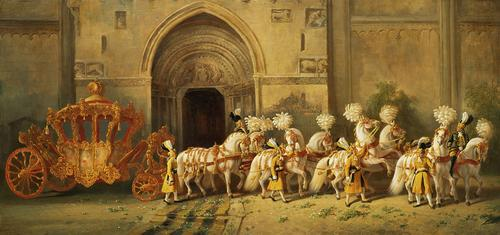
The Imperial Coach with horses in front of the main gate of St Stephen's Cathedral, Vienna (painting by Prestel c. 1848/1850)

The Imperial Coach (in German: Imperialwagen) is the gilded state coach that was used as a coronation coach for the Imperial and Imperial Austrian courts in Vienna, Austria. It is now kept in the Imperial Carriage Museum at Schönbrunn Palace.

== See also ==
- List of state coaches
