= Wanda (magazine) =

Wanda was a weekly literature magazine published in Warsaw. It was one of the first Polish magazines for women.

The magazine was published from 1820 to 1822 by Bruno Kicinski and edited by Franciszek Ksawery Godebski and D. Lisicki. Since 1823, the magazine was published and edited by Franciszek Ksawery Godebski.
