= Aleksander Ignacy Lubomirski =

Polish noble and financier

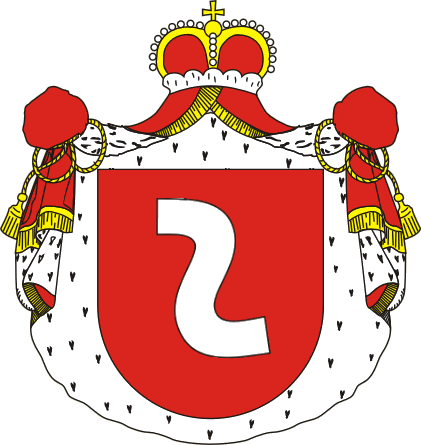
- Coat of arms: Lubomirski
- Born: 11 August 1802; Kraków, Habsburg monarchy
- Died: 12 June 1893 (aged 90); Paris
- Family: Lubomirski
- Wife: Julia Radziwiłł
- Father: Franciszek Ksawery Lubomirski
- Mother: Maria Lvovna Naryshkina

Aleksander Ignacy Lubomirski (11 August 1802 – 12 June 1893) was a Polish noble, financier and philanthropist.

Son of Ksawery Lubomirski, he had no children. Made a fortune investing in the Suez Canal Company. Founder of the Main Building of Kraków University of Economics, as well as a monastery and girls school in Łagiewniki.
