= Xawery =

Xawery is a Polish given name. It is a version of name Xavier, with another variation of Ksawery. Xawery may refer to:

- Xawery Czernicki (1882–1940), Polish engineer, military commander and one of the highest-ranking officers of the Polish Navy
- Xawery Dunikowski (1875–1964), Polish sculptor and artist, Auschwitz concentration camp survivor
- Xawery Stańczyk (born 1985), Polish poet, sociologist and essayist
- Xawery Wolski (born 1960), Polish-Mexican artist and sculptor
- Xawery Żuławski (born 1971), Polish film director
- Franciszek Xawery Drucki-Lubecki (1778–1846), Polish politician, freemason and diplomat

== See also ==
- ORP Kontradmirał Xawery Czernicki, multitask logistic support ship of the Polish Navy
- Ksawery
