= Franciszek Gąsior =

Polish handball player (1947–2021)

Personal information
- Nationality: Polish
- Born: 21 April 1947 Tarnów, Poland
- Died: 26 August 2021 (aged 74)
- Height: 1.79 m (5 ft 10 1/2 in)

Sport
- Sport: Handball
- Position: Centre back

Senior clubs
- Years: Team
- –1970: ZKS Tarnów
- 1970–1978: SPR Stal Mielec
National team
Years	Team	Apps	(Gls)
1970–1975	Poland	80	(120)

Franciszek Gąsior (21 April 1947 – 26 August 2021) was a Polish handball player who competed in the 1972 Summer Olympics and finished tenth with the Polish team.
