= Francis Xavier Lasance =

American writer and priest

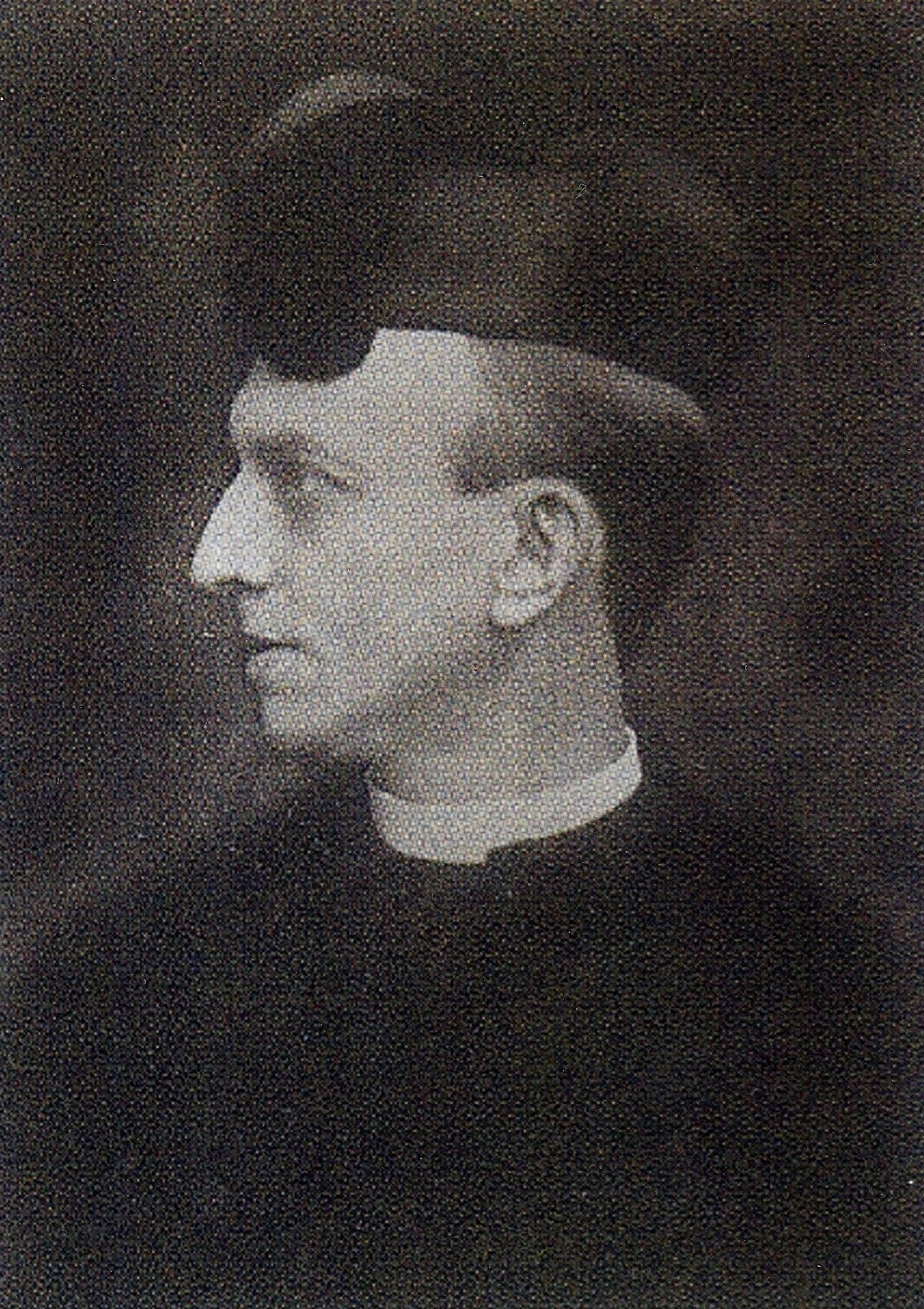
- Born: Francis Xavier Lasance; January 24, 1860
- Died: December 11, 1946 (aged 86)
- Occupations: American priest and writer of Roman Catholic devotional works
- Known for: He wrote 39 volumes.; He was given a special blessing by Pope Pius XI on May 10, 1927

Francis Xavier Lasance [F. X. Lasance] (January 24, 1860 – December 11, 1946) was an American priest and writer of Roman Catholic devotional works.

== Early years ==
Born in Cincinnati, Ohio, he was the son of Augustine and Philamena (Detert) Lasance. He was educated at St. Mary's School and St. Xavier College (Cincinnati) and St. Meinrad Archabbey (Indiana), and was ordained by the Most Reverend William Henry Elder, Archbishop of Cincinnati, on May 24, 1883.

== Parish work ==
During the next seven years, Lasance served as curate in various parishes in the Archdiocese of Cincinnati including churches in Kenton, Reading, Dayton, Lebanon, and Monroe, Ohio. He also served as chaplain at Our Lady's Summit, in East Walnut Hills, in Cincinnati. Ill health forced him to relinquish parish work in 1890; from then on, he lived a "retired, semi-invalid existence" at St. Francis Hospital, Cincinnati, writing various books on spiritual subjects and serving as spiritual director of the Tabernacle Society.

== Writings ==
He wrote thirty-nine volumes, including:

- Thoughts on the Religious Life (1907)
- My Prayer Book (1913)
- Reflections for Religious (1920)
- Our Lady Book (1924)
- The New Roman Missal (1937) (with the Rev. Fr. Augustine Walsh, OSB)
- Patience: Thoughts on the Patient Endurance of Sorrows and Suffering (1937)
- Kindness, The Bloom of Charity, Thoughts on Fraternal Charity (1938)
- The Catholic Girl's Guide
- Manna of the Soul
- Visits to Jesus in the Tabernacle, Hours and Half-hours of Adoration before the Blessed Sacrament (1897)
- Road to Happiness
- With Saints and Sages
- The Young Man's Guide
- Let Us Pray
- Come Holy Spirit: Prayer Book for Religious(1904)
- Lift Up Your Hearts
- Blessed Sacrament Book
- My God and My All
- Holy Souls Book
- Sacred Heart Book
- Little Manual of St. Anthony
- Rejoice in the Lord
- The Prisoner of Love
- With God (1911)
- Sweet Sacrament, We Thee Adore
- Emmanuel
- Holiness and Happiness
- Novenas and Devotions in Honor of the Holy Ghost
- Self-Conquest
- Remember
- Let Us Go to Jesus
- Manual of the Holy Eucharist: Conferences on the Blessed Sacrament and Eucharistic Devotions
- Mass Devotions and Readings on the Mass
- Peace, Not as the World Gives
- Pious Preparation for First Holy Communion: With a Retreat of Three Days
- Prayer Book for Religious
- Sermons on the Blessed Sacrament: and Especially for the Forty Hours' Adoration
- Short Visits to the Blessed Sacrament

He also compiled and edited the Blessed Sacrament Book (1913).

His works were translated into numerous languages. In total, his texts were published in the millions. He refused all compensation for his work and asked that any profits be donated to charity or toward providing his works free of charge to those unable to purchase them. For his devotional works, he was given a special blessing by Pope Pius XI on May 10, 1927.

A number of Lasance's writings have been reprinted and are currently available from various traditionalist Catholic publishers, including My Prayer Book, Manna of the Soul, Blessed Sacrament Book, and The New Roman Missal (reprinted in 1993 by Christian Book Club of America), which at present is one of the most popular hand missals favored by American traditionalist Catholics.

== Death ==
Father Lasance died at the age of eighty-six, in his native city.
