= Franciszek Trześniewski =

Polish gourmand and cook

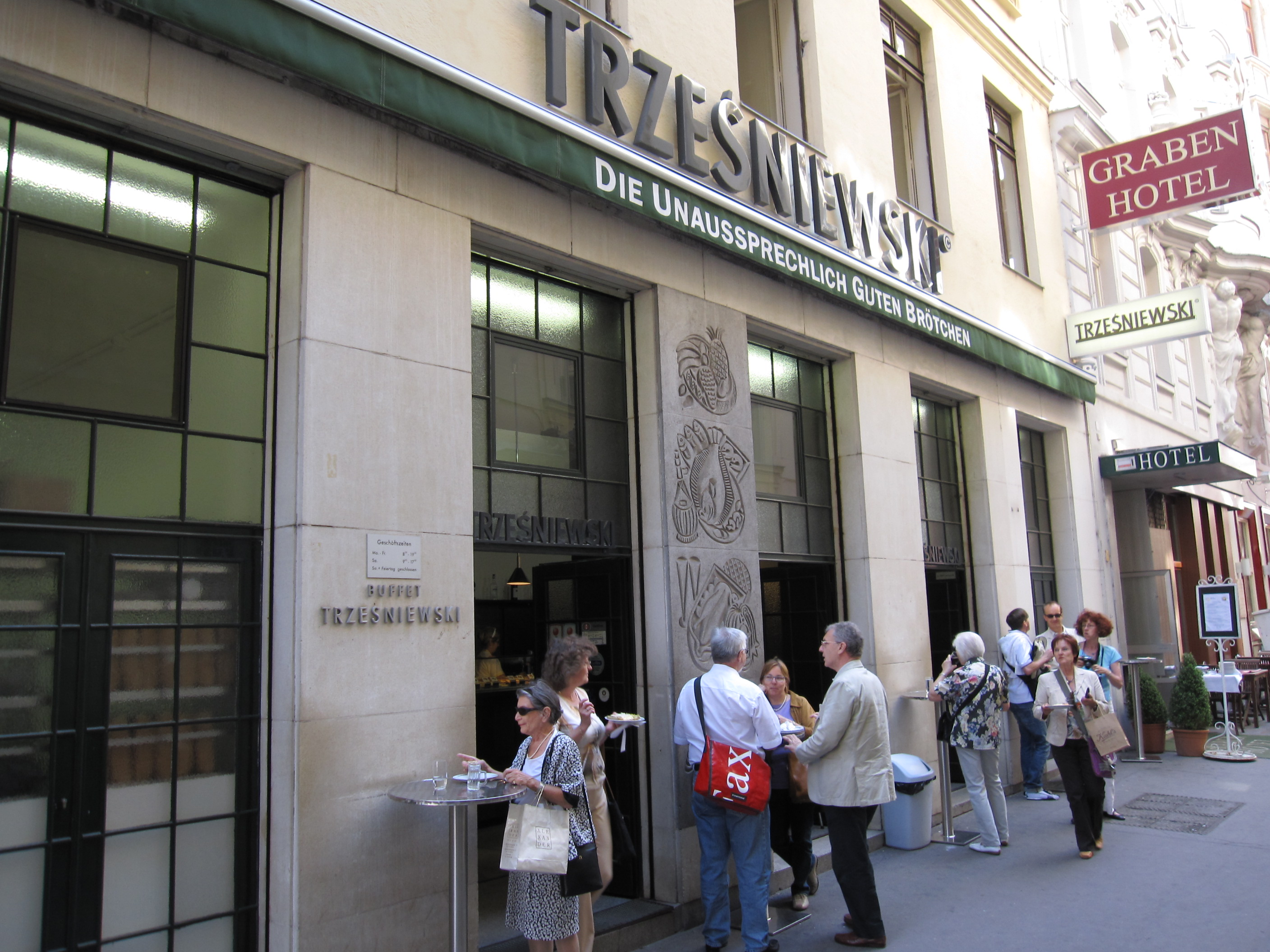
Dorotheergasse, Innere Stadt

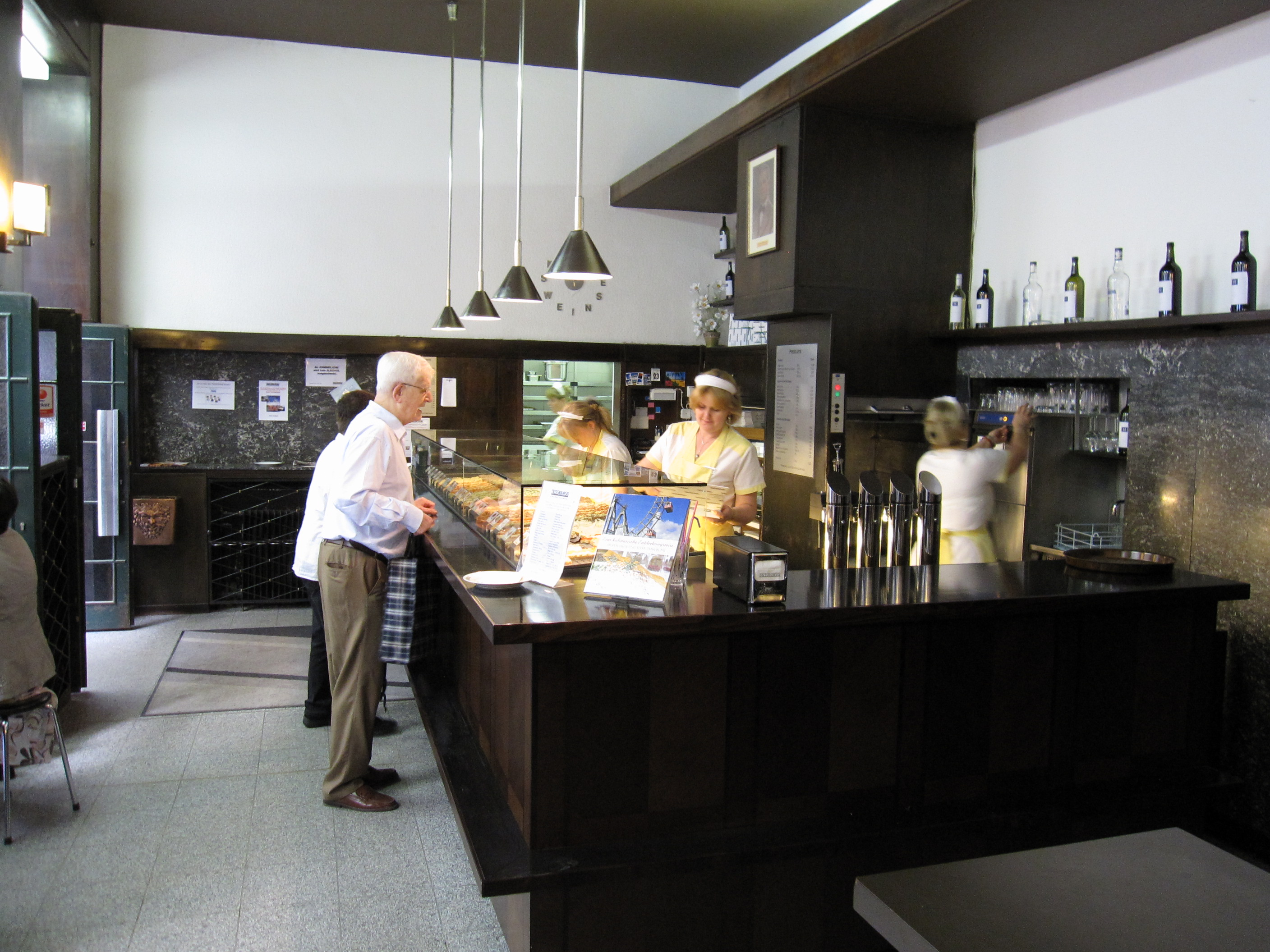
Inside Trześniewski

Franciszek Trześniewski (Polish pronunciation: [fraɲˈt͡ɕiʂɛk tʂɛɕˈɲɛfskʲi]; died 1939) was an early 20th-century Polish gourmand and cook. Born in Kraków, at that time belonging to Western Galicia (Austro-Hungarian Monarchy), he is notable for the restaurant-bar he opened in Vienna in 1902, shortly before World War I. His spécialité de la maison were open sandwiches made of fresh, local dark bread cut into the typical rectangle-form with various spreads. After his death the bar was run by his daughter, Maria Trześniewska, who sold it in 1978.

Nowadays the Trześniewski restaurant at Dorotheergasse 1, in Vienna, is considered one of the best in town and is one of only three restaurants of the city centre advertised by the official municipal website. In all, there are 8 outlets in the city, each selling more than 20 various types of sandwiches, along with a Pfiff of Beer (a small glass, 1/8L) or Vodka. The official motto of the company is Unspeakably good sandwiches, a reference to the Polish name of the founder, which is said to be unpronounceable to most German speakers.
