= Francois-Xavier Duplessis =

Clergyman in New France (1694–1771)

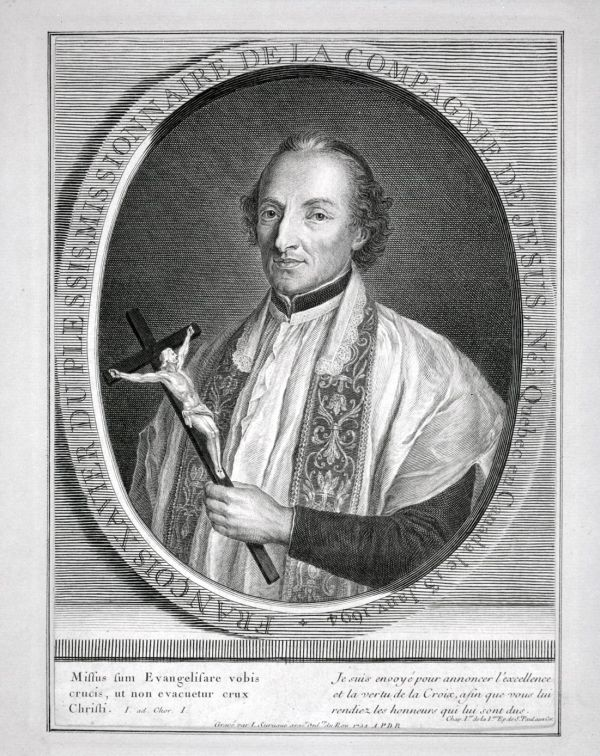
1744 etching of François-Xavier Duplessis

François-Xavier Duplessis, (born Notre-Dame Quebec, January 13, 1694, died December 2, 1771), also written du Plessis, was a clergyman in New France.

He became a member of the Society of Jesus, and practiced on First Nation missions. He wrote "Avis et Pratiques pour Profiter de la Mission et en Conserver le Fruit a l'Usage des Missions du Pere du la Compagnie de Jesus" (3 vols., Paris, 1742), and "Lettre au Sujet des Calomnie-Publiees par l'Auteur des Nouvelles Ecclesiasliques" (1745).

== See also ==
- St. Francis Xavier University
