= Francisco Javier Illán Vivas =

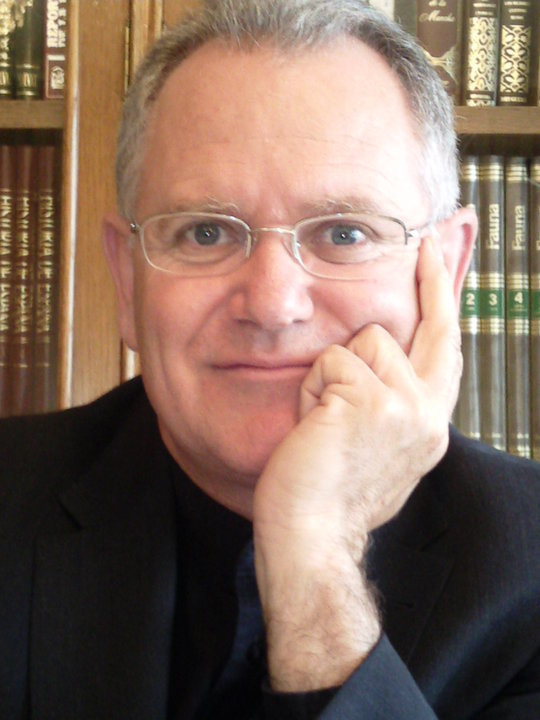
Francisco Vivas

Francisco Javier Illán Vivas (born in 1958 in Molina de Segura, Spain) is a writer and poet from Murcia.

== Biography ==
Illán Vivas has almost always been related to the media world. He was widely known by his friends and family as Javier

Years ago, he was a correspondent for Diario de Murcia and for La Verdad de Murcia; currently he writes for the weekly digital publication Vegamediapress.com, where, in January 2006, he was named sub-director. He is in charge of producing the Culture and Literature section.

== Style ==
His narrative is similar to the classic fantasy genre; very close to the adventure style of Robert E. Howard, but in the world of Mediterranean mythology. His short stories follow the style of H. P. Lovecraft. His poetry is focused on love songs.

== Work ==
=== Poetry ===
- Con paso lento, Nausícäa Edición Electrónica, 2003.
- Dulce amargor, Edición del Ayuntamiento de Molina de Segura, 2005.

=== Narratives ===
- La cólera de Nébulos. Libro I: La Maldición, Nausícäa Edición Electrónica, 2004.
- Con la pluma a cuestas: catorce escritores desde La Rioja. (Antología de relatos; el autor participa con "La casa de mi madre"), Editorial Dossoles, 2004.
- Cuentos de la Molineta. (Antología de relatos de la asociación La Molineta Literaria; el autor participa con "La estatua del santo"), Edición del Ayuntamiento de Molina de Segura, 2006
