= Franciszek Salezy Dmochowski =

Polish writer

Franciszek Salezy Dmochowski (1801–1871) was a Polish writer, poet, translator, critic, journalist and publisher. He studied at the University of Warsaw. He took part in the distribution of illegal bibuła press and publications in partitioned Poland.

Son of Franciszek Ksawery Dmochowski.

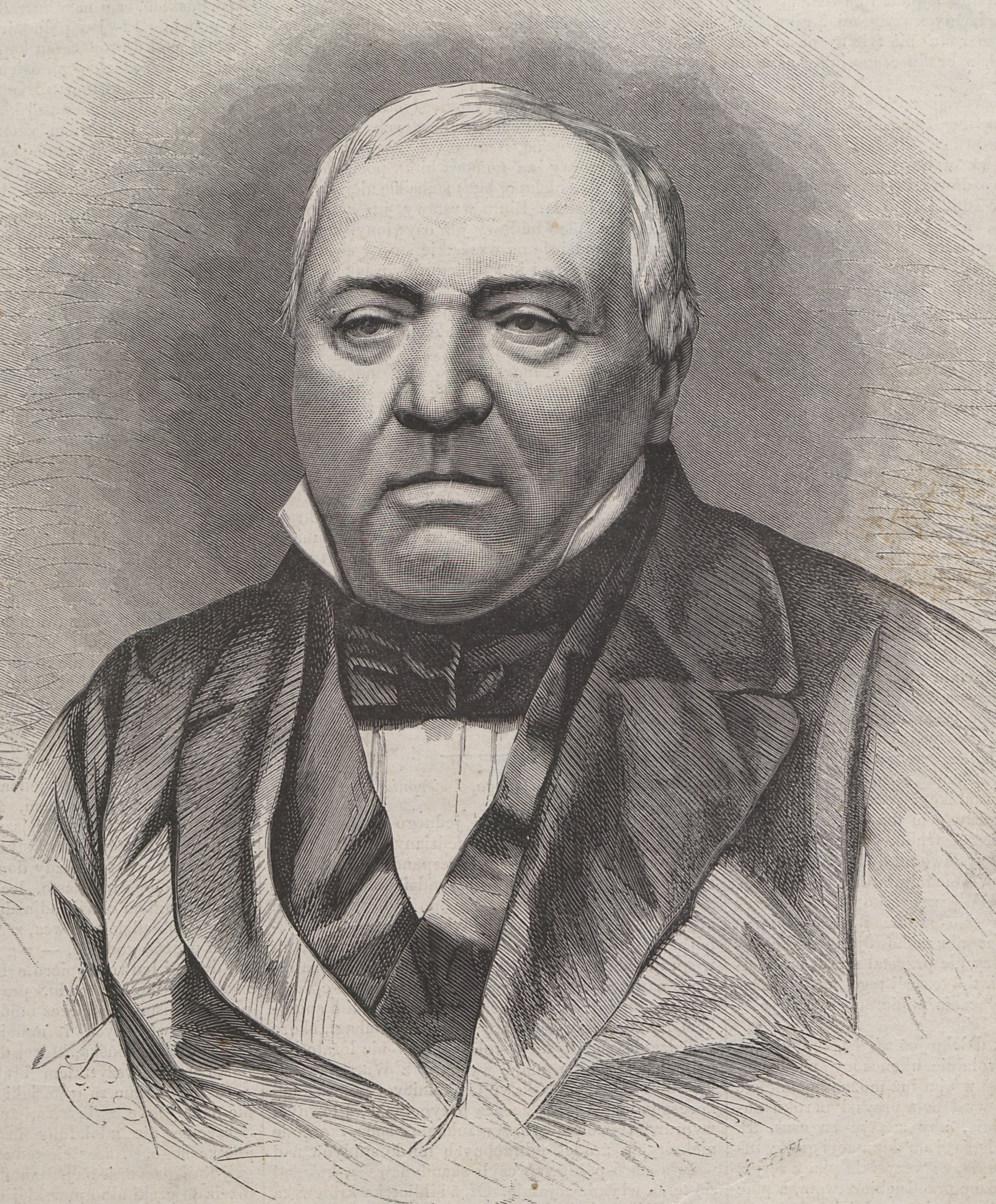
The portrait of Franciszek Salezy Dmochowski
