= Franz Xaver Wagenschön =

German painter

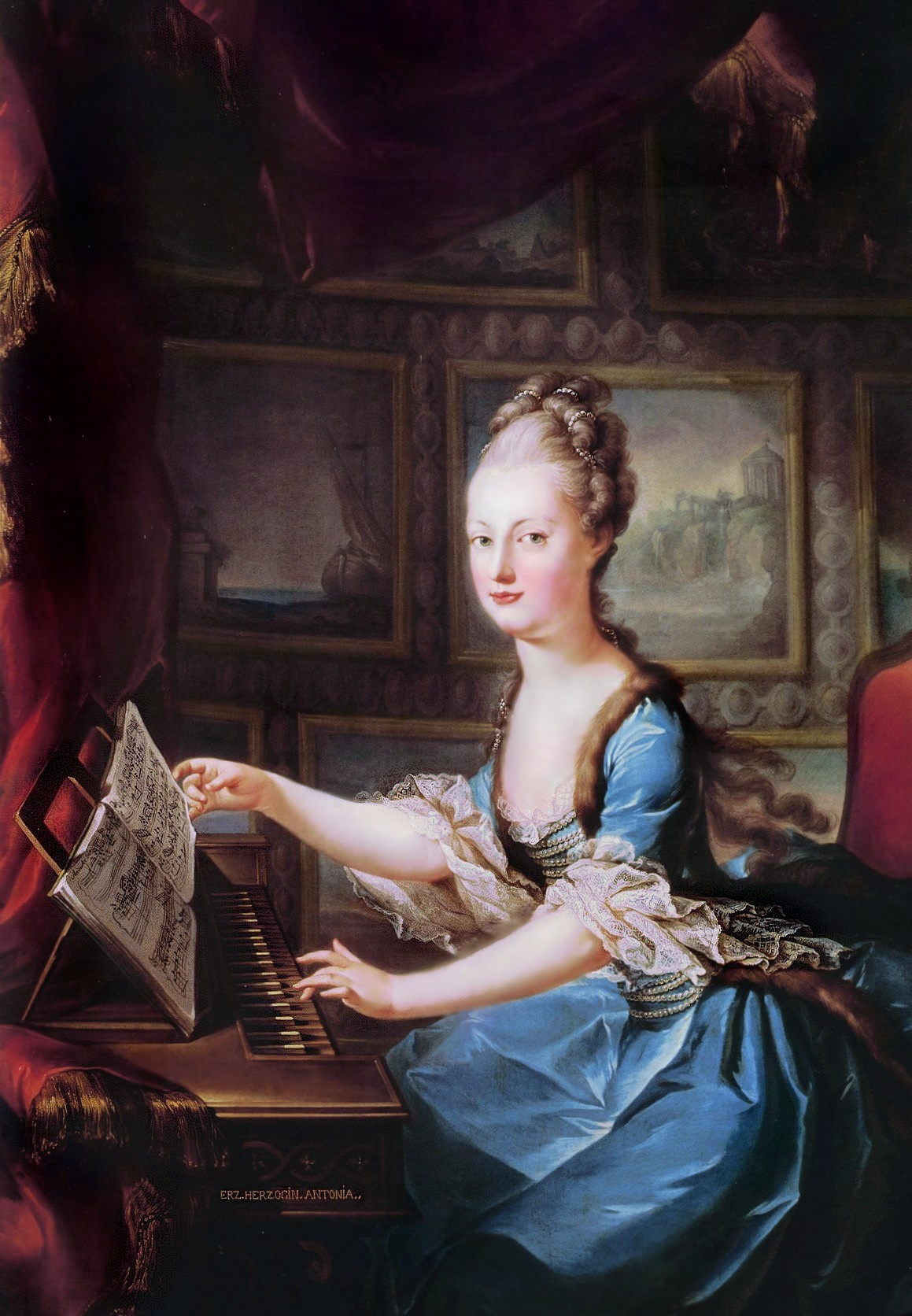
Marie Antoinette at the spinnet, just before her 1770 marriage, by Franz Xaver Wagenschön

Franz Xaver Wagenschön (2 September 1726, Littisch, Bohemia (now Litíč, Czech Republic) – 1 January 1790, Vienna) was a German Bohemian painter of the Rococo and Neoclassical styles. His works are to be found in the Kunsthistorisches Museum of Vienna, in Graz and in Upper Austria.

== Life ==
In 1747 he went to Vienna to attend the local art academy, becoming a member of it in 1770. He was also a student of Paul Troger. In his early years he was a carriage painter, producing portraits of noblemen, working in this vein at the end of the 1760s for the children of Maria Theresa of Austria, especially Marie Antoinette (later queen of France), and in 1763 painting the panels for the golden Imperialwagen. In later life he produced religious and allegorical works influenced by the Italian Baroque. He was also known for his works for monasteries and churches, including Poysdorf, Göttweig, Ollersbach, Scheibbs, Purgstall and Tulln.

== Gallery ==
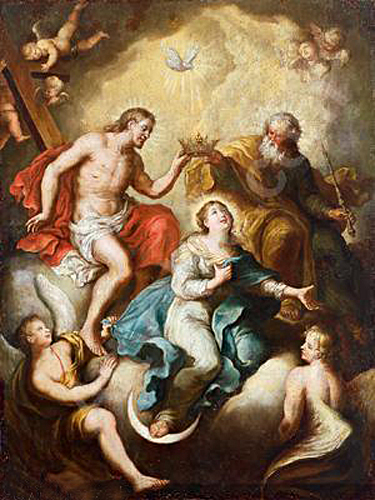
The Crowning of Mary

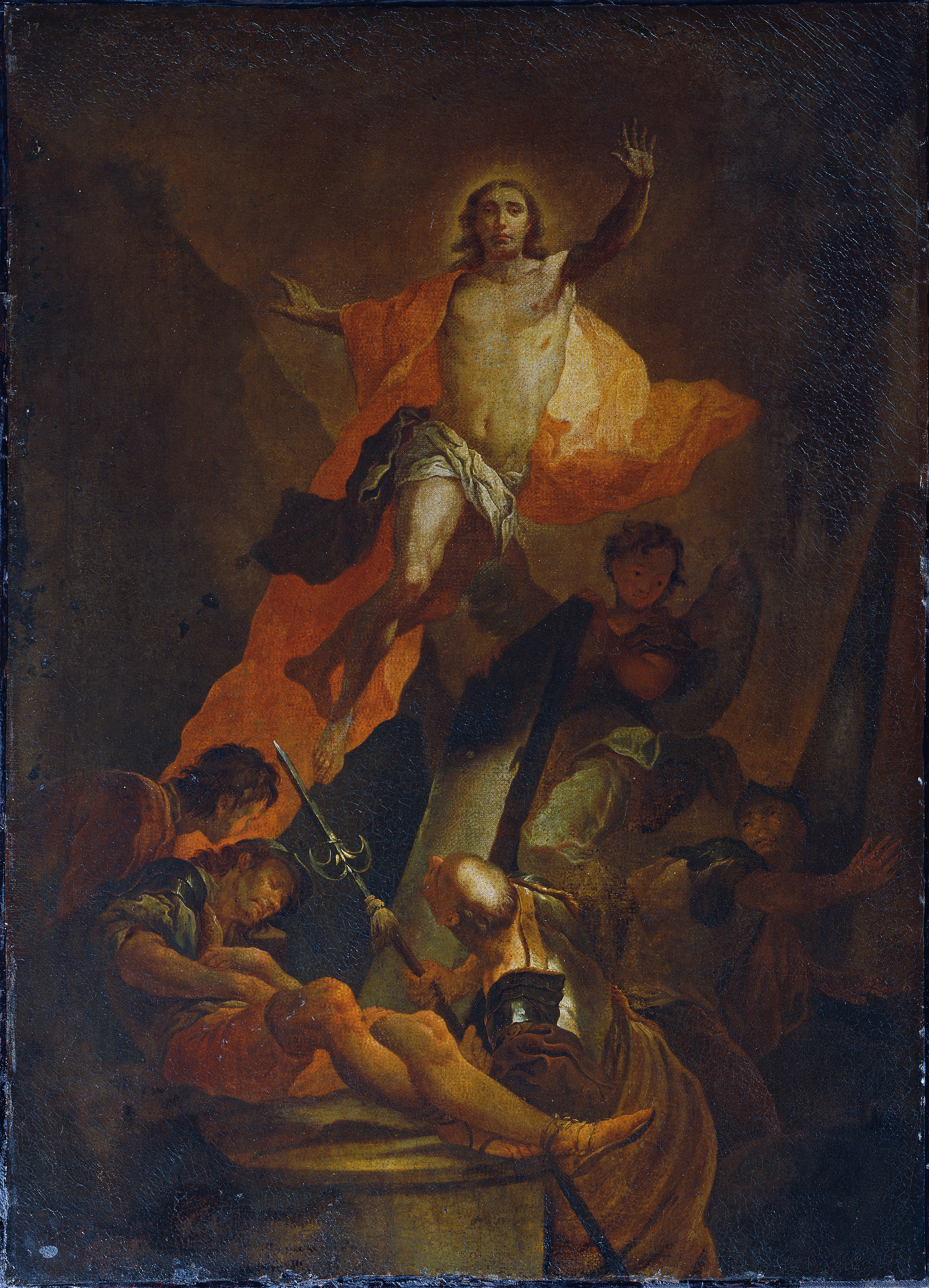
Resurrection of Christ

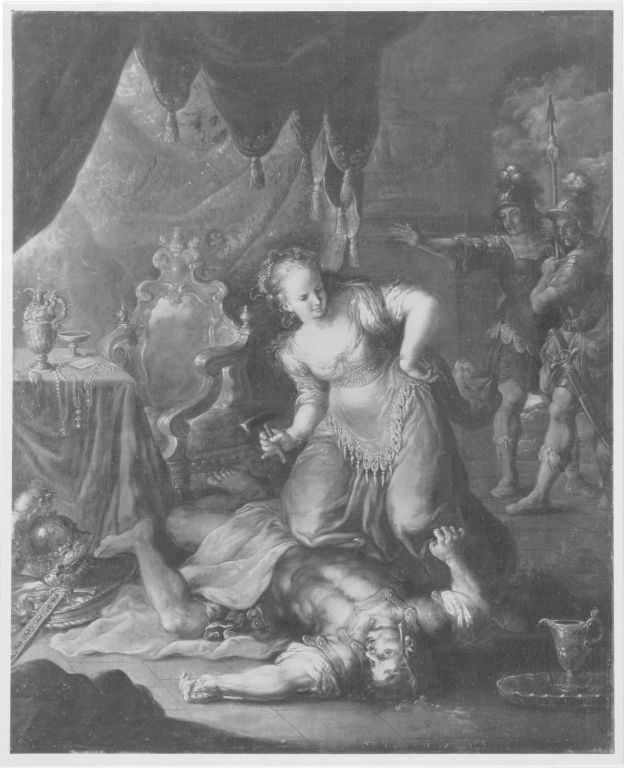
Jael and Sisera

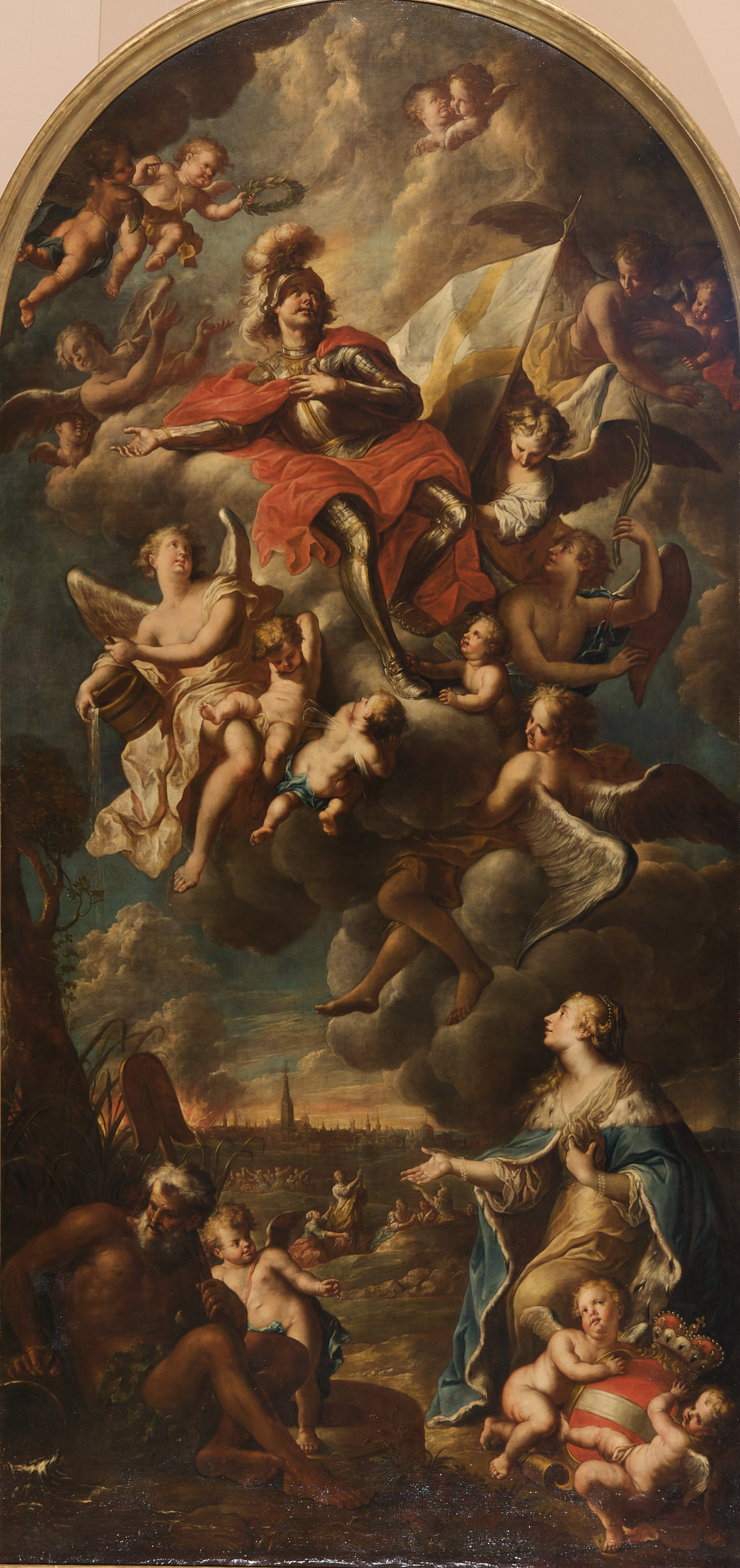
Saint Florian (circa 1778)

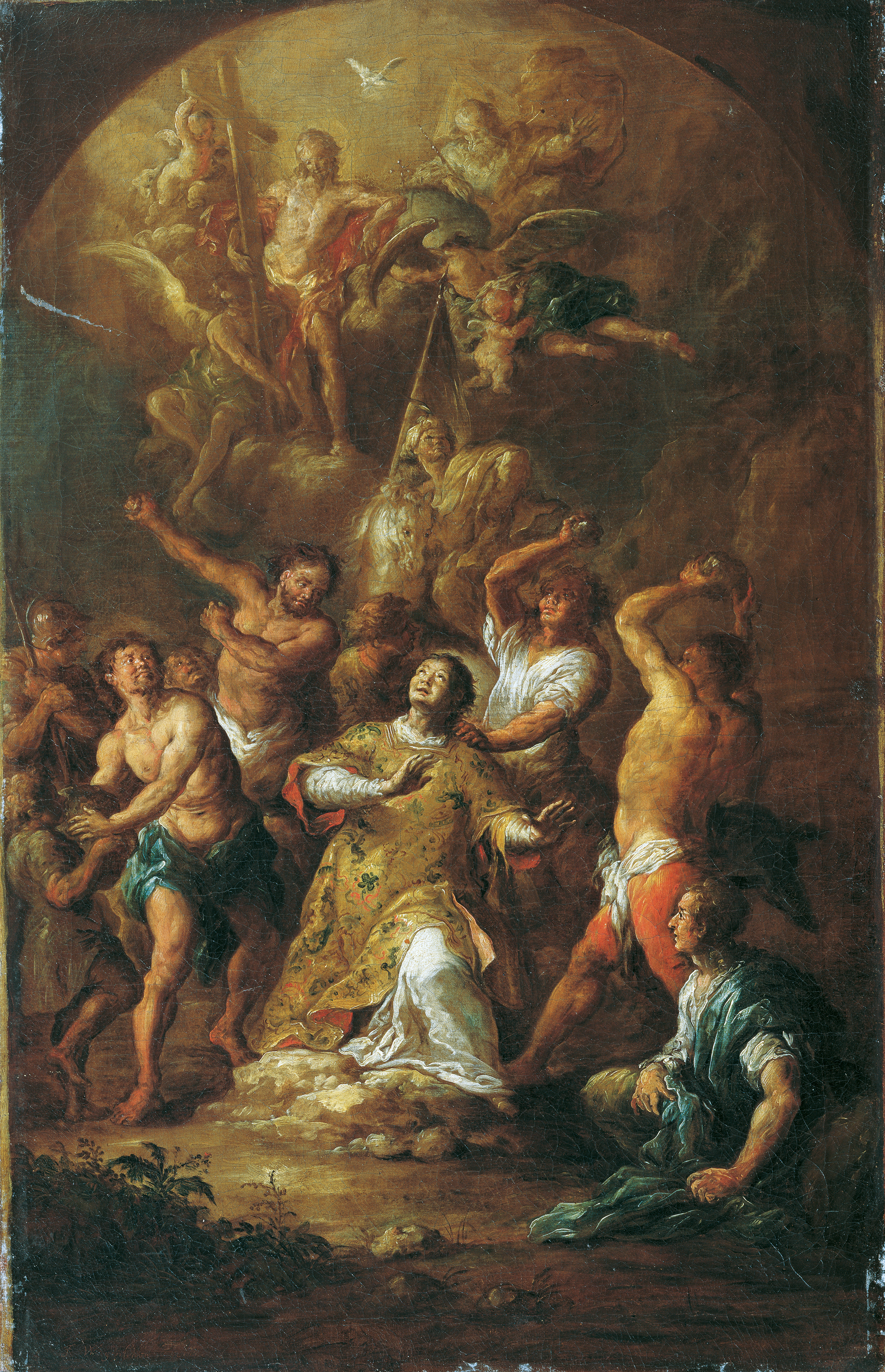
Saint Stephen

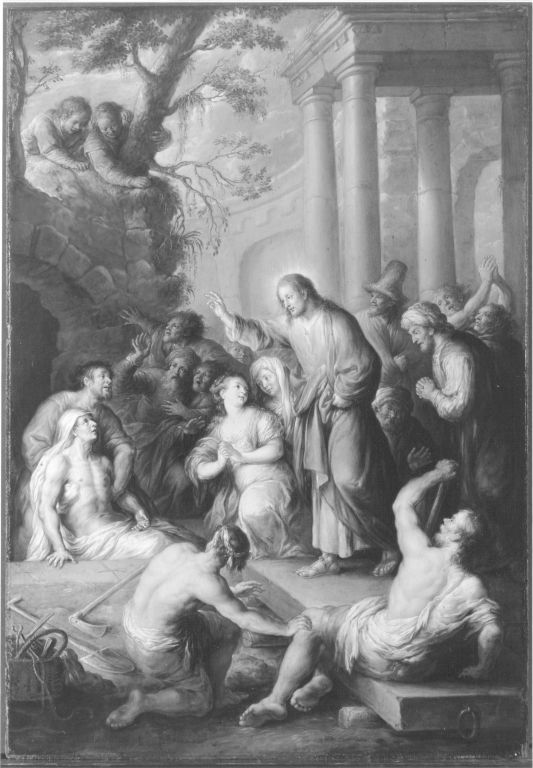
Christ raises Lazarus from death (circa 1763)

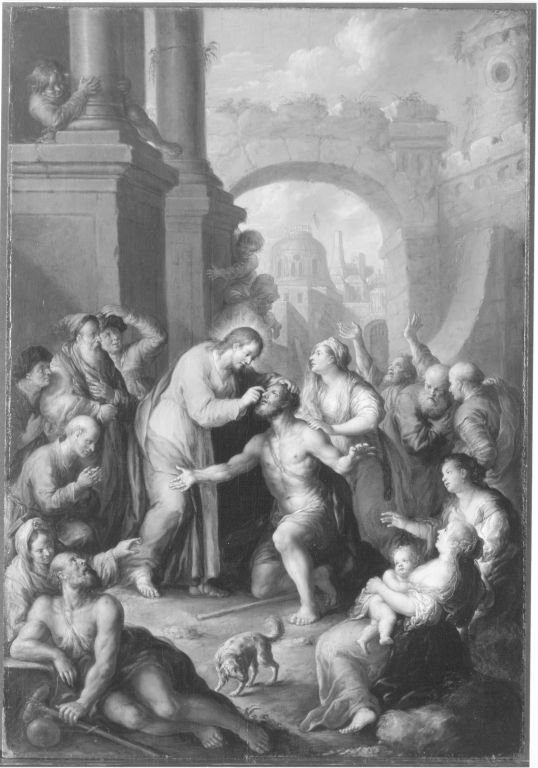
Christ heals the blind (circa 1763)

== Sources ==
- Radka Miltová: "Franz Xaver Wagenschön a "Metamorphoses d'Ovide en rondeaux“
