= Francis Xavier Mancuso =

Tammany Hall leader and New York judge

Francis Xavier Mancuso (October 30, 1887 – July 8, 1970) was a leader of Tammany Hall and a judge for New York's Court of General Sessions. He died on July 8, 1970, in Daytona Beach, Florida.
