= Franciszek Ksawery Dmochowski =

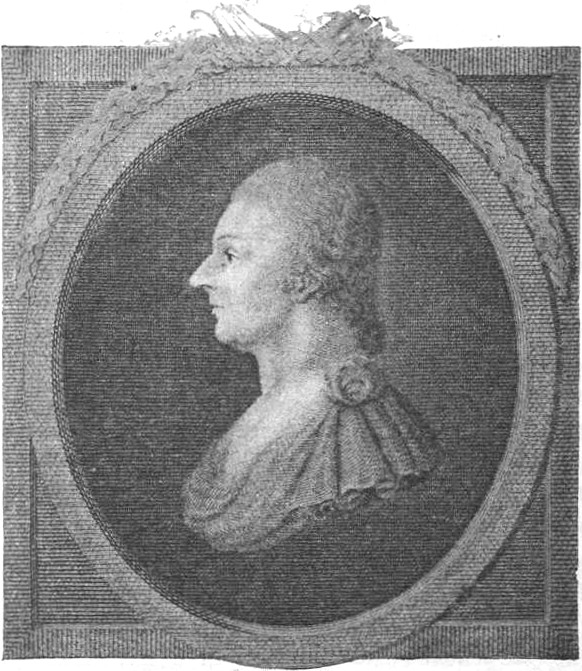

Franciszek Ksawery Dmochowski (1762–1818) was a Polish Romantic novelist, poet, translator, publisher, critic, and satirist. Father of Franciszek Salezy Dmochowski.

== Biography ==
Dmochowski was born in Oprawczyki in Podlaskie Voivodeship on 2 December 1762, to a family of the minor Polish nobility (szlachta).

He attended the Jesuit and Piarist schools in Drohiczyn, then in 1778 in Podoliniec in Spisz. After his novitiate he was admitted to the Piarist order in 1778. Member of the Piarist order from 1778 to 1789.

He taught in Piarist schools in Radom, then was transferred to Warsaw in 1785. From 1786 to 1788, he taught Latin in the college in Łomża, then in Radom. In 1789, Dmochowski was a teacher in a department school in Warsaw. At the same time he became a close companion of Hugo Kołłątaj, who obtained for him a release from the order’s duties and then from the presbytery in Koło. In 1791, he became the personal secretary and the close assistant of Kołłątaj, together with whom he emigrated to Saxony at the time of the Targowica Confederation to participate in the preparation of Kościuszko Uprising (1794).

In March 1794, he organised Tadeusz Kościuszko’s pronouncement in Kraków. During the Insurrection he co-edited the "Gazeta Wolna Warszawska" ("The Free Warsaw Gazette") and "Gazeta Rządowa” ("The Government Gazette"). He was also the member of Supreme National Council (Rada Najwyższa Narodowa) - de facto leader of the National Instruction Department (as a deputy to Jan Jaśkiewicz). After the defeat of the Insurrection he left for Venice, then moved to Paris where he belonged to the Deputation. As a result of Ignacy Krasicki’s intervention with the Prussian authorities he returned to Warsaw in 1799. After his conversion to Protestantism he married Izabela Mikorowska. He was one of the founders of the Society of the Friends of Science. From 1801 to 1805, he co-edited another newspaper, "Nowy Pamiętnik Warszawski" ("New Memoirs from Warsaw"). In 1806, he moved to a purchased estate in Kujawy. Dmochowski died on June 20, 1808, during his return journey from Warsaw.

== Works ==
Dmochowski was the author of celebratory poems, pamphlets, political leaflets; one of his major achievements was the first full translation of The Iliad into Polish. He also translated fragments of The Odyssey, The Aeneid, the works of Horace and Lucan and Milton’s Paradise Lost. His most famous work was Sztuka rymotwórcza (The Art of Rhyming) (published in 1788), an adaptation of L’art poétique by Boileau, inspired by Horace, Diderot and Pope; referring to the dissertation by Golański entitled O wymowie i poezji (On Rhetoric and Poetry) Dmochowski formulated here the canon of Polish literary classicism. The work was later the subject of a polemic presented by Mickiewicz in the dissertation O krytykach i recenzentach warszawskich (On Warsaw Critics and Reviewers).
