= Franciszek Ksawery Chomiński =

Franciszek Ksawery Chomiński (c. 1730 – 9 June 1809) was a Polish soldier, politician, translator and poet. Sejm deputy, deputy to the Lithuanian Tribunal and voivode of Mscislaw from 1788 in the Polish–Lithuanian Commonwealth, and marshal of the Grodno Governorate in the Russian Empire after partitions of Poland.

A cavalry officer, he was a supporter of the Bar Confederation. Later, he became more active in the Commonwealth politics, and was a deputy to Sejms of 1780, 1782 and 1784; at the latter one he served as its marshal. He was among the supporters of the Constitution of the 3rd May. After the partitions of Poland he supported Adam Czartoryski in Paris. He also served, as the marshal of the Grodno Governorate.

He received the Order of Saint Stanislaus in 1784 and the Order of the White Eagle in 1785.

As a writer, he wrote poetry and epigrams, and translated into Polish several works from French, most notably, those of Jean Baptiste Racine.
