= Ksawery Lubomirski =

Polish noble (1747–1819)

Franciszek Ksawery Lubomirski
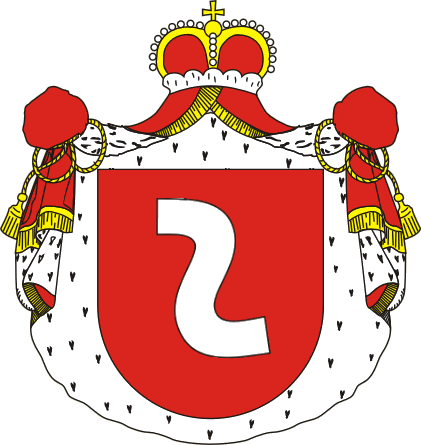
- Coat of arms: Lubomirski
- Born: 1747; Smila, Kiev Voivodeship
- Died: 1819 (aged 71–72)
- Family: Lubomirski
- Consort: Antonia Adela Potocka; Teofila Rzewuski; Maria Lvovna Naryshkina
- Issue: with Teofila Rzewuski; Konstanty Stanislaw Lubomirski; Eugeniusz Lubomirski with Maria Lvovna Naryshkina; Antoni Juliusz Lubomirski; Aleksander Ignacy Lubomirski
- Father: Stanisław Lubomirski
- Mother: Ludwika Honorata Pociej

Franciszek Ksawery Lubomirski (1747–1819) was a Polish noble, Russian general.

Franciszek was born in a family of Stanisław Lubomirski voivode of Kijow who he had many possessions in Kiev Voivodeship, which following the First Partition of Poland fell under the Russian Empire control.

Franciszek Ksawery decided to become a Russian citizen. In 1777 he joined the Russian Army, eventually reaching the rank of general major.

Married three times, he had several children. His first wife was a daughter of the voivode of Kijow Franciszek Salezy Potocki. His second wife was a daughter of the Great Standard-bearer of Lithuania Stanisław Ferdynand Rzewuski. His third wife was a granddaughter of Kirill Razumovsky.
