= Franciszek Ksawery Zachariasiewicz =

Polish bishop (1770–1845)

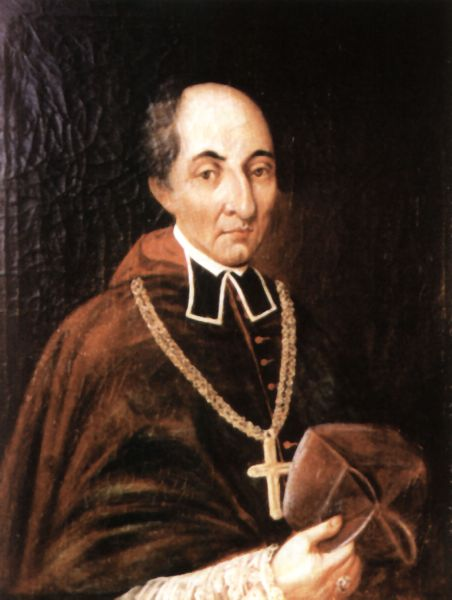
Franciszek Ksawery Zachariasiewicz

Franciszek Ksawery Abgaro-Zachariasiewicz (1 December 1770 in Stanyslaviv – 12 June 1845 in Przemyśl; sometimes Zacharyasiewicz or Zacharjasiewicz) was a Polish Roman Catholic bishop of Przemyśl, elevated in 1840. He was also bishop of Tarnów (elevated in 1835). First ordained a priest in the Armenian Catholic Church in 1795, he became a priest of the Roman Catholic Church in since 1812. He also served as professor (1800–1827) and rector (1826/1827) of Lviv University. In 1835 Zachariasiewicz founded theological seminary in Tarnów. His work focused on the history of the Christian Church, Poland, and Armenians.

He was a son of Abgaro Zachary and Helena Asiewicz-Passakasow. Her father Tomasz Asiewicz (former Osiewicz, Lith.Asevicius) is inscribed in encyclopedias of Polish nobles. Franciszek's uncle was bishop Grzegorz Zachariasiewicz (1740-1814).Many Zachariasiewiczes were Greek-catholic priests. Zachary (679-752) was the Rome Pope.
