= Franciszek Ksawery Godebski =

Polish politician and writer

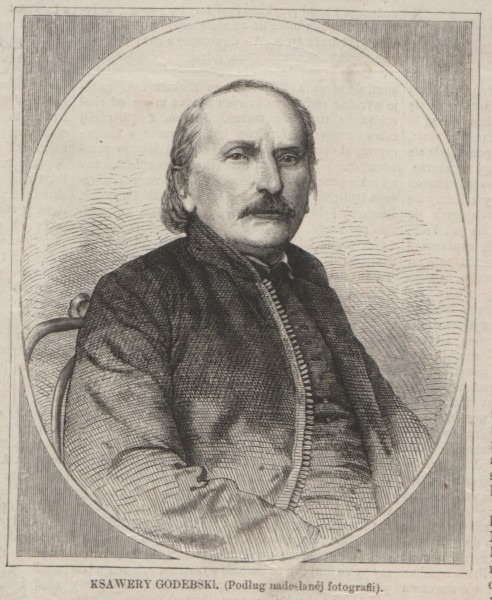
Franciszek Ksawery Godebski

Franciszek Ksawery Godebski (1801 – 17 May 1869) was a Polish writer and journalist.

He was born in Frankenthal. Cyprian Godebski was his father, and Dobrogost his pseudonym.

Franciszek was from 1822-1823 editor of several literature magazines in Warsaw, among others of "Wanda". He participated in the November Uprising, was member of the Sejm in 1831 and editor of the "Orzel Bialy" magazine.

From 1832 until 1858 he lived in France. In 1841 he co-founded, and from 1853 was a lecturer at, the Batignolles School (Szkola batiniolska). In 1849 Franciszek became administrator of the "La Tribune des Peuples" (People's Trubune). After his return to Poland, he became curator of the Ossolineum in Lwów.

He died in Lwów, where he was buried in the Łyczakowski Cemetery.
