= Sándor Boldogfai Farkas =

Hungarian sculptor (1907–1970)

Sándor Farkas de Boldogfa
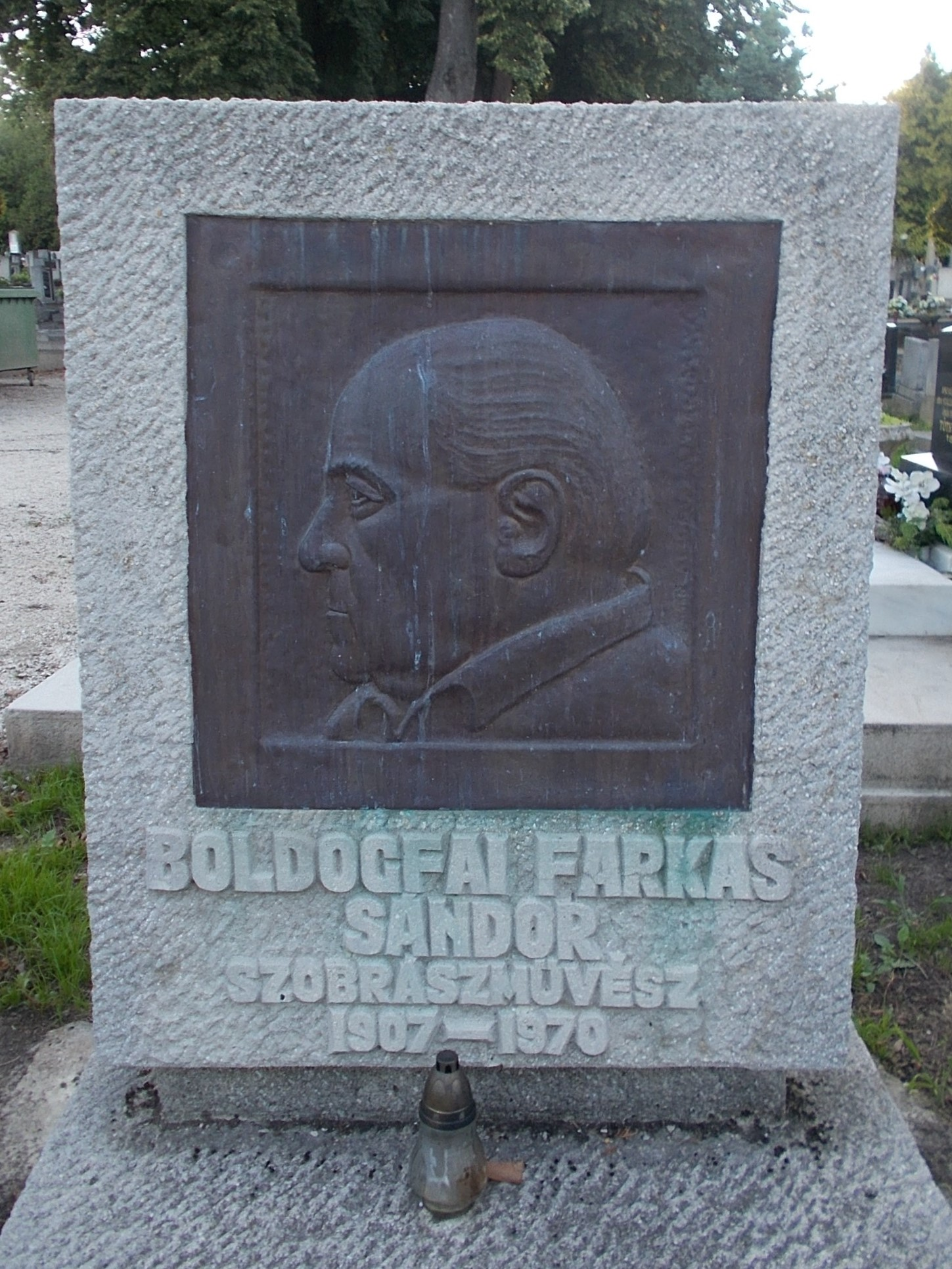
- Born: 29 July 1907; Turčišće (Hungarian: Törökudvar)
- Died: 12 November 1970 (aged 63); Budapest
- Other name: Boldogfai Farkas Sándor
- Occupation: Sculpture
- Known for: Public sculptures

Sándor Farkas de Boldogfa (29 July 1907 – 12 November 1970) was a Hungarian sculptor, medalist.

== Biography ==
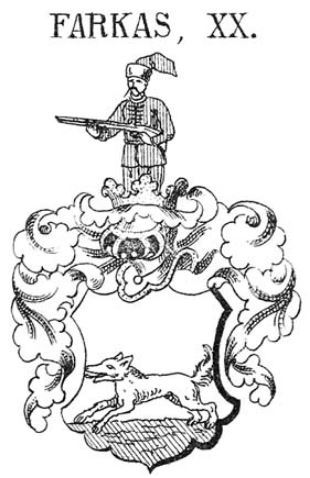
Coat of arms of the Hungarian noble family Farkas de Boldogfa

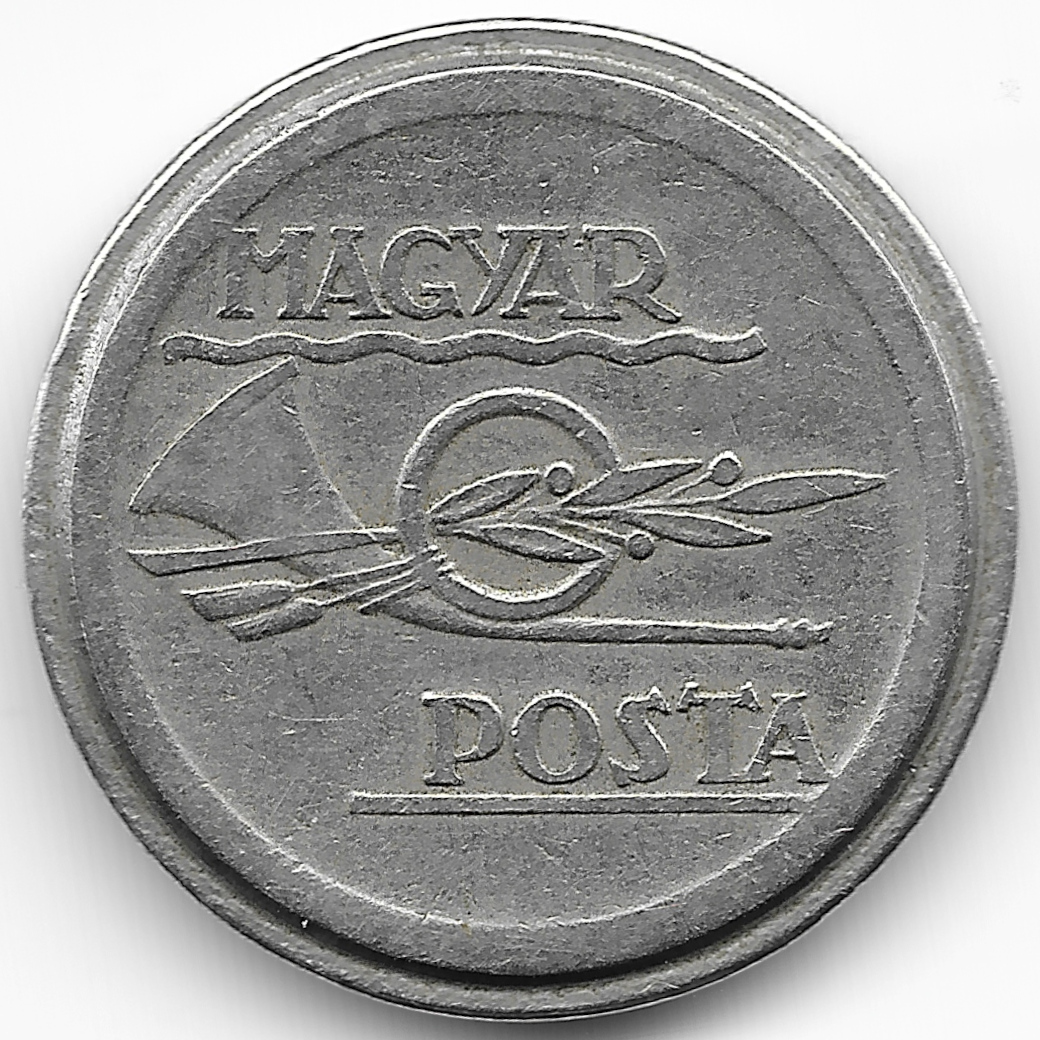
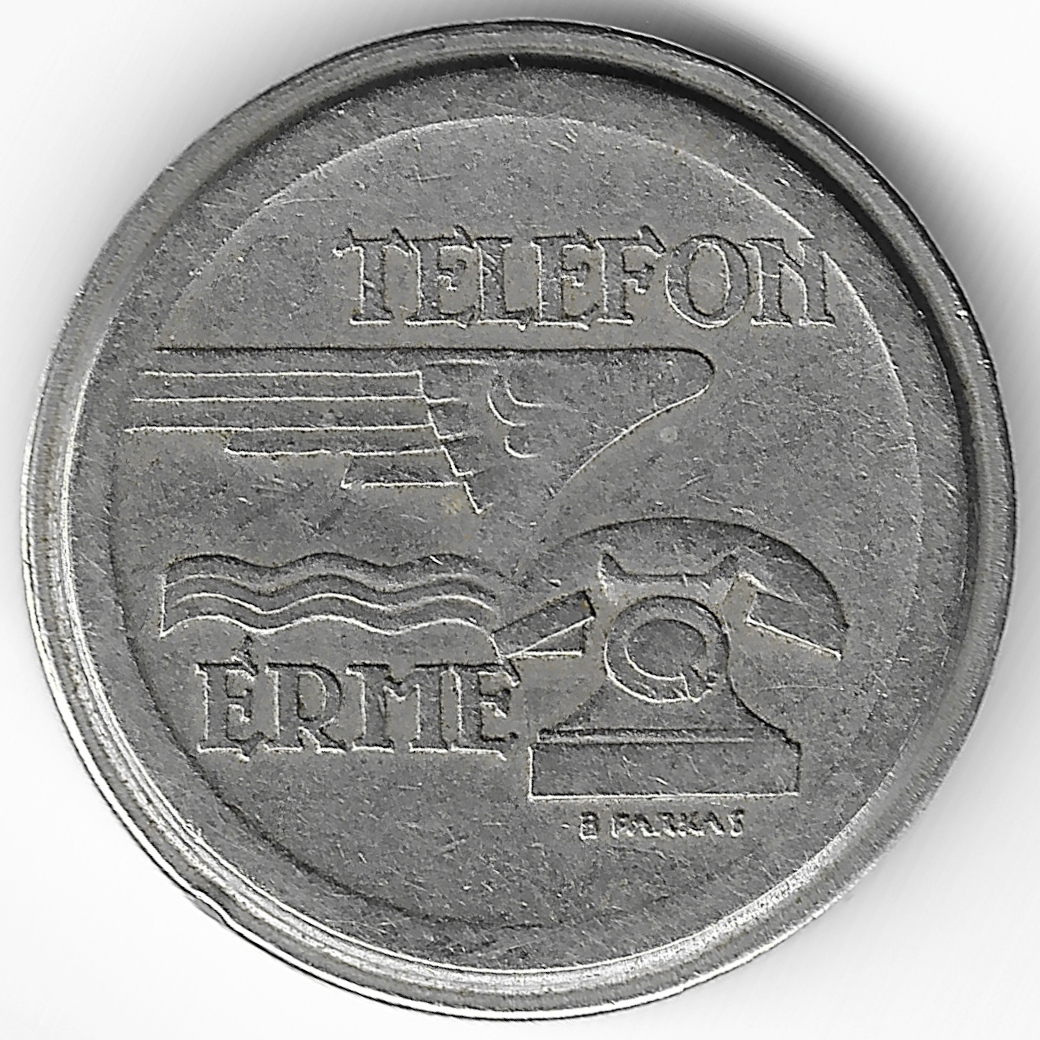
When the Payphone was introduced in Hungary Sándor Boldogfai Farkas designed the first coin (called "Tantusz") that used for these public machines.

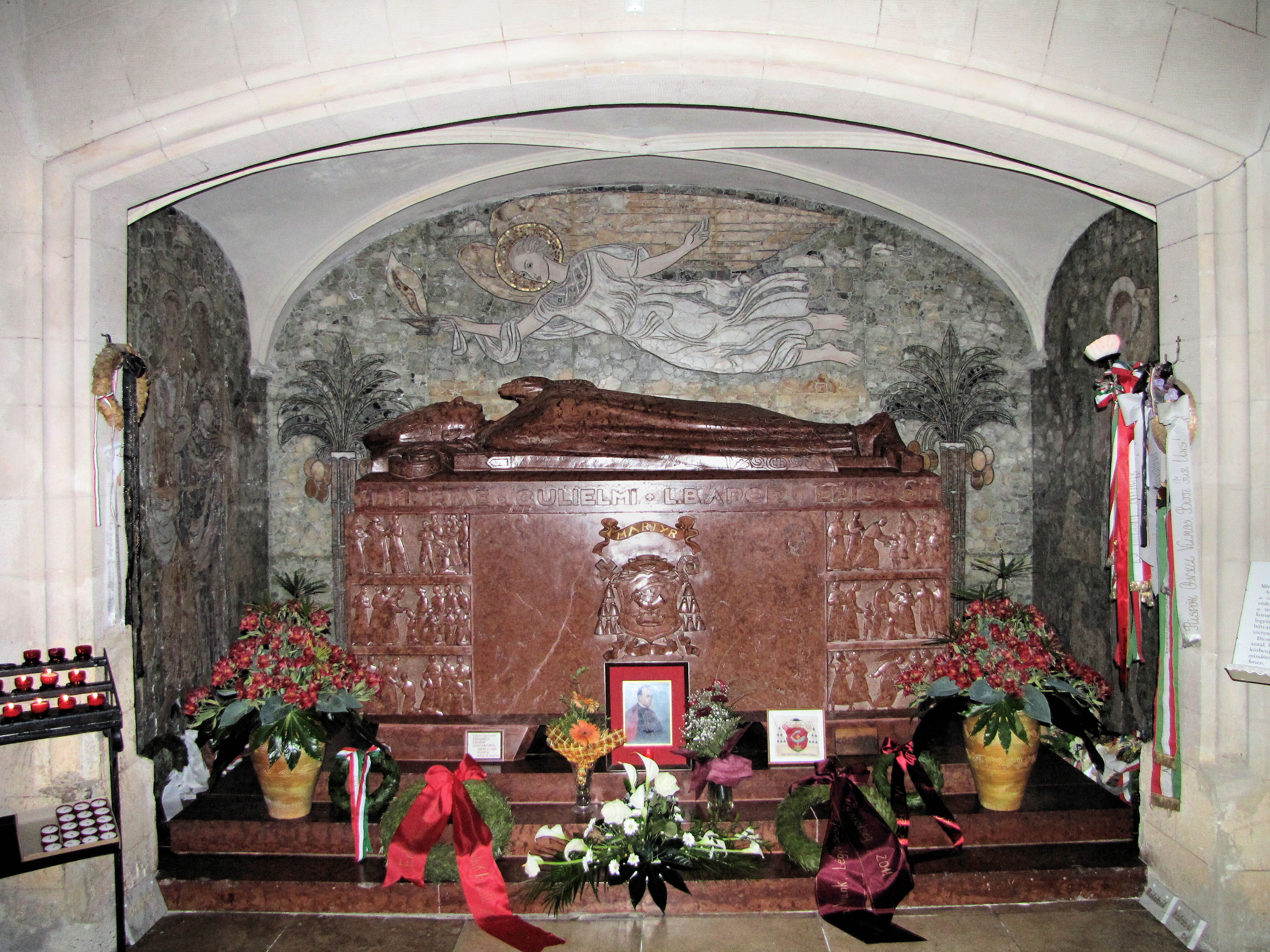
Vilmos Apor tomb (1948, Cathedral Basilica of Győr)

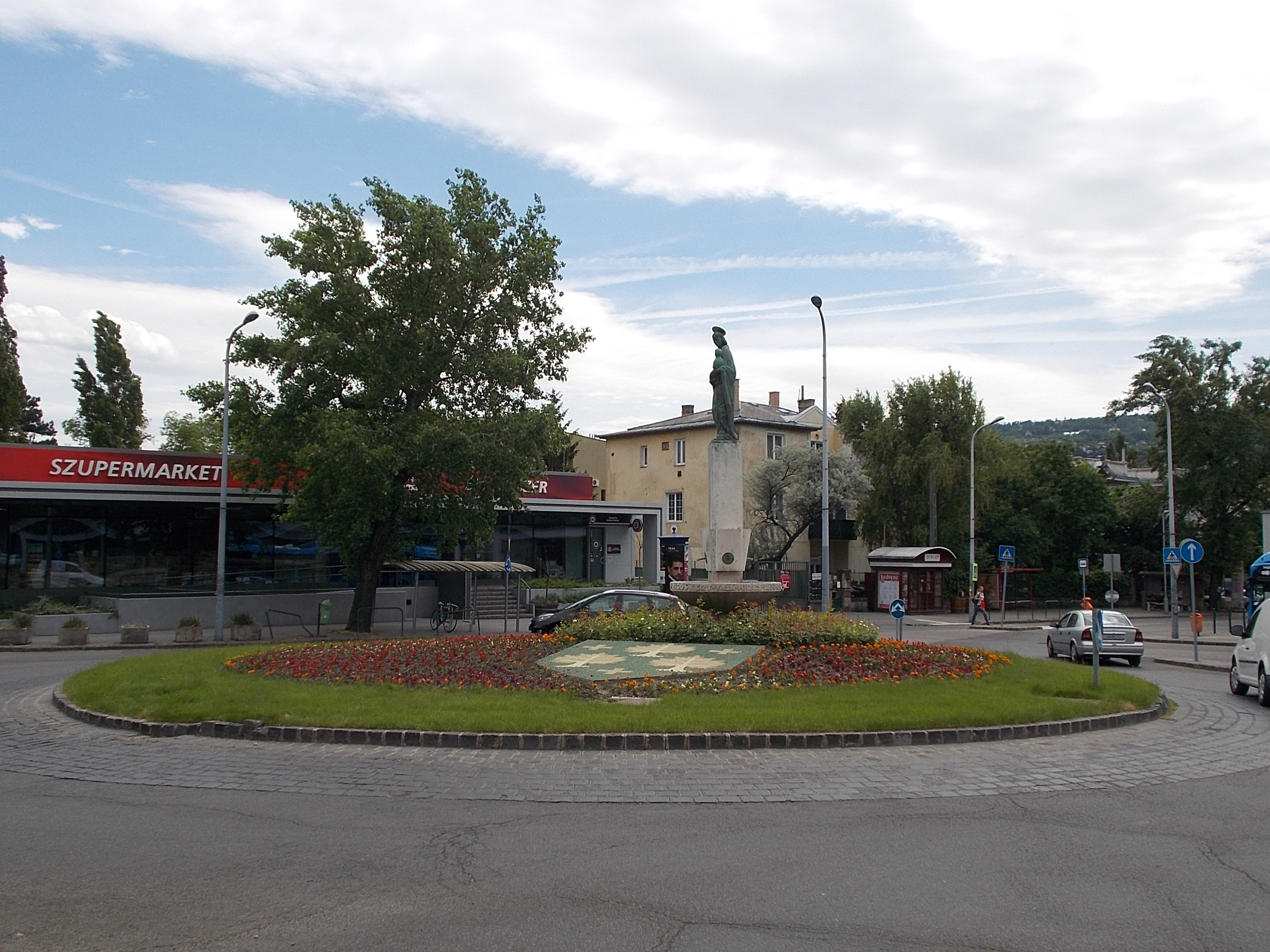
Fountain of the Holy Mary (1939, Budapest, Pasaréti square)

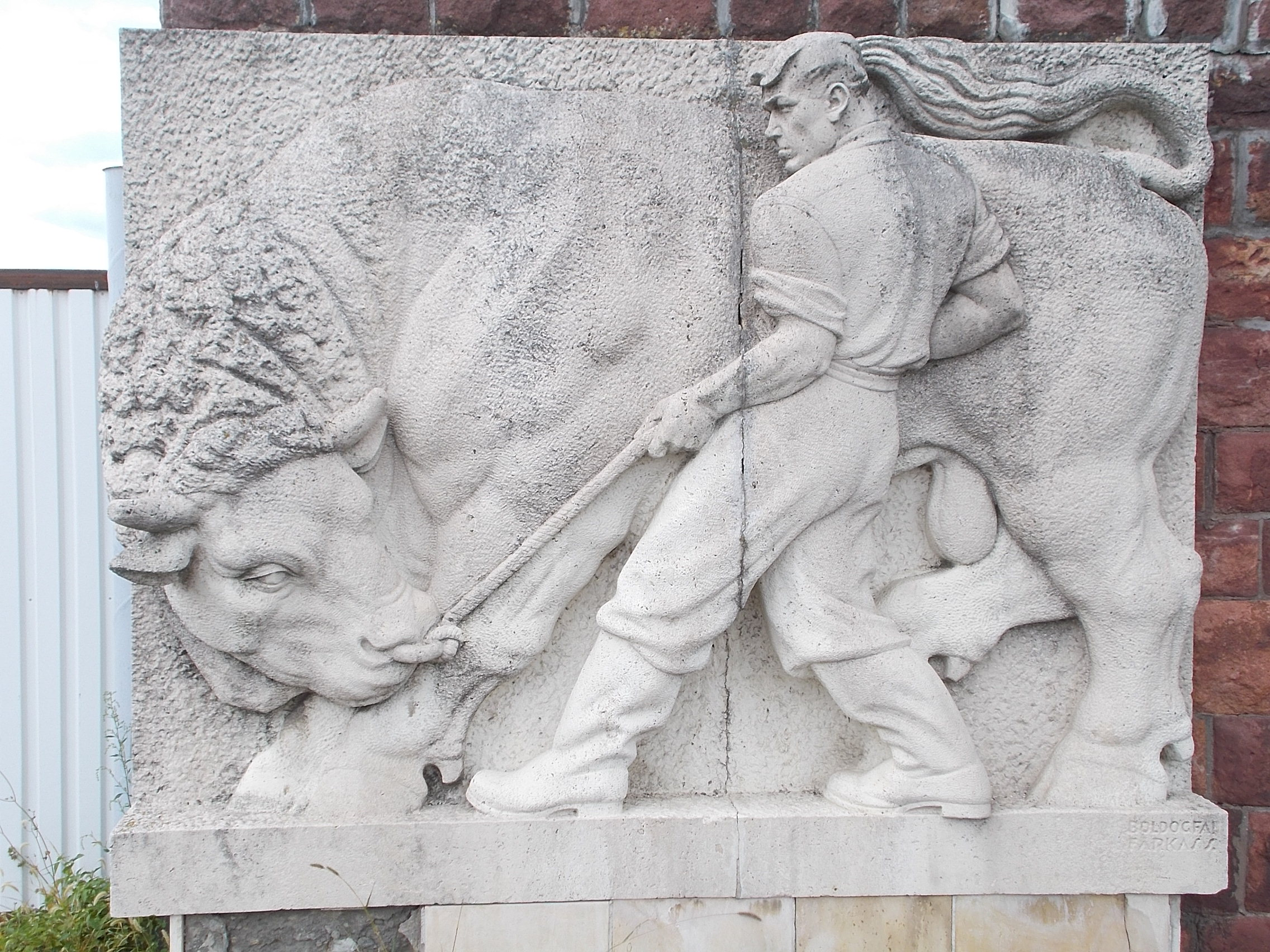
Bull leading (1956, Keszthely, Tapolcai street 45.)

Sándor Farkas de Boldogfa (in Hungarian: Boldogfai Farkas Sándor) was born in Törökudvar (Turcsiscse, Croatian: Turčišće), Comital Zala, Royal Hungary in 1907. He hailed from the ancient Roman Catholic Hungarian noble family Farkas de Boldogfa from the Zala county. His father was Lajos Farkas de Boldogfa (1878–1930), administrator of the lands of Törökudvar that belonged to Count Jenő Festetics. His mother was Eugenia Margitai (1882–1908). His paternal grandparents were Ferenc Farkas de Boldogfa (1838–1908), landowner, Zala county auditor and monetary comptroller of the county, and the noble lady Zsófia Marton de Nemesnép (1842–1900). Sándor Boldogfai Farkas had several paternal uncles: vitéz Sándor Farkas de Boldogfa (1880– 1946), colonel of the Kingdom of Hungary, captain of the Order of Vitéz of the county of Zala, knight of the Order of the Iron Crown, and also dr. István Farkas de Boldogfa (1875–1921), jurist of the Kingdom of Hungary, supreme chief magistrate of district of Sümeg (főszolgabíró) in the county of Zala. Sándor Boldogfai Farkas' half sister Mária Farkas de Boldogfa married the Hungarian sculptor József Ispánki.

Sándor studied goldsmithing at the School of Applied Arts between 1921 and 1926, then he continued his studies at the College of Fine Arts between 1927 and 1933. His masters were István Csajka and Zsigmond Kisfaludi Strobl. In 1926 he was awarded with the Ferenczy István Prize, and in the same year he received the Metropolitan Prize and the Rothermere Prize. Between 1931 and 1932 he was teaching assistant to Zsimond Kisfaludi Strobl. Between 1932 and 1933 he studied at the Accademia di Belle Arti di Roma with an Italian state scholarship. In 1933 he was awarded the Budapest Capital Award for his "Loader" statue. In 1942 he and Tibor Gallé opened a free arts school in Budapest. Sándor Boldogfai Farkas married the noble lady from Transylvania Julianna Nagy de Szotyor in 1934 on Budapest, daughter of Mozes Nagy de Szotyor (1868–1943), the Calvinist pastor of Turda, and Rozalia Barla. Sandor Boldogfai Farkas and Julianna Nagy de Szotyor soon divorced. On 6 November 1937 he married the noble lady Erzsébet Csákány de Lécfalva (1908–1970), daughter of Zsigmond Csákány de Lécfalva and Julianna Lányi.

On 19 December 1943, Ferenc Deák Literary and Art Circle was formed in Zalaegerszeg with the participation of 28 artists, including Sándor Boldogfai Farkas. He didn't fight in the Second World War, but after the Soviets occupied Budapest in 1945 he was arrested by them; he was released only months later. He worked and lived at the Art Colony on Százados Avenue (Százados úti művésztelep). The Second World War devastated great part of the buildings of Budapest: in 1957 the Hungarian sculptors Sándor Boldogfai Farkas, Ödön Metky and János Sóváry carved replicas in the New York Caféof the damaged allegorical sculptures of Thrift and Wealth, America and Hungary. For a while in the 1960s, his favorite subjects were animal life, holy persons, and creatures of Greek mythology. When the Payphone was introduced in Hungary Sándor Boldogfai Farkas designed the first coin (called "Tantusz") that used for these public machines.

Based on his life sized "Deer" named fountain sculpture of bronze, the Herend Porcelain Manufactory produced a porcelain figurine replica of a deer cow, breastfeeding it's calf (the piece is 25 cm high).

His funeral was 10 days after his death on 23 November 1970, at the Göcseji Road Cemetery, Zalaegerszeg. Some of his medals are in the Göcsej Museum in Zalaegerszeg.

== Several of his sculptures ==
- „Ne féljetek kicsinyhitűek!" relief (1928, Balatonfüred, Round church)
- Thérèse of Lisieux (1933, Budapest, Saint Stephen Martyr church, II. District)
- Bust of vitéz Miklós Horthy (1936, Balatonfüred, Honvéd street 2.)
- Mihály Munkácsy (1936, Törökbálint, Munkácsy Mihály út 83.)
- János Kabay memorial tomb (1937, Budapest, Farkasréti cemetery)
- Bust of Lajos Tüköry (1938, Villa Garibaldi, Palermo)
- Female portré (1938, Nagykőrös, cemetery of Kecskeméti út)
- Fountain of the Holy Mary (1939, Budapest, Pasaréti square)
- Ifjú akt (1939, Zürich)
- Memorial plaque of László Kelemen (1940, Budapest I. District, Színház u. 1–3.)
- János Kabay (1946, Tiszavasvári, Báthori street 3.)
- Vilmos Apor tomb (1948, Cathedral Basilica of Győr)
- Roe deer and it's calf (1953, Dorog)
- Mother with her child (1954, Budapest, Palatinus water park on Margaret Island)
- Ferenc Erkel (1955, Budapest, Margaret Island)
- Vizafogó (1955, Zalaegerszeg, city waterpark)
- Fountain díszkút (1956, Budapest XX. district, Teremszeg street)
- Bull leading (1956, Keszthely, Tapolcai street 45.)
- Juditka (1957, Nagykőrös, cemetery of Kecskeméti út)
- Dog (1957, Budapest XIX. District, Árpád street 14.)
- Pinguins (1958, Budapest X. District, Üllői úti ltp. Szárnyas street)
- Terpsichore (1960, Debrecen, Csokonai Theater)
- Ferenc Rózsa (1961, Budapest, Zrínyi Akadémia)
- Monkey (1961, Budapest III. District, Gyenes street 8.)
- Calf (1964, Budapest XI. District, next to the az Irinyi József u. 32/C)
- Bust of Döme Horváth (1964, Kecskemét, Noszlopy-park)
- Boy with sailboat (1965, Balatonfüred, Ady street 40.)
- Faun (1967, Dunavecse, Fő út 35.)
- Franz Liszt (1969, Zalaegerszeg)
- Gyula Derkovits (1969, Budapest, Pihenő street 1.)
- Saint Emeric of Hungary, (Budapest, St. Stephen's Basilica)
- Saint Pope Pius X (Budapest, Kapisztrán Szent János church, II. District)
