= Ferenc Farkas (disambiguation) =

Ferenc Farkas (1905–2000) was a Hungarian composer.

Ferenc Farkas may also refer to:

- Ferenc Farkas de Boldogfa (1713–1770), Hungarian nobleman, jurist and landowner
- Ferenc Farkas de Kisbarnak (1892–1980), Chief Scout of the Hungarian Boy Scouts,
- Ferenc Farkas (Zala county auditor) (1838–1908), Hungarian nobleman
- Ferenc Farkas (Jesuit priest) (1742–1803), Jesuit priest and poet
