= János Nepomuk Farkas =

Hungarian politician (1774–1847)

János Nepomuk Farkas de Boldogfa

vice-ispán of the county of Zala (alispán of Zala)

Personal details
- Born: 6 June 1774 Zalaboldogfa, county of Zala
- Died: 5 May 1847 (aged 72) Alsóbagod, county of Zala
- Profession: jurist
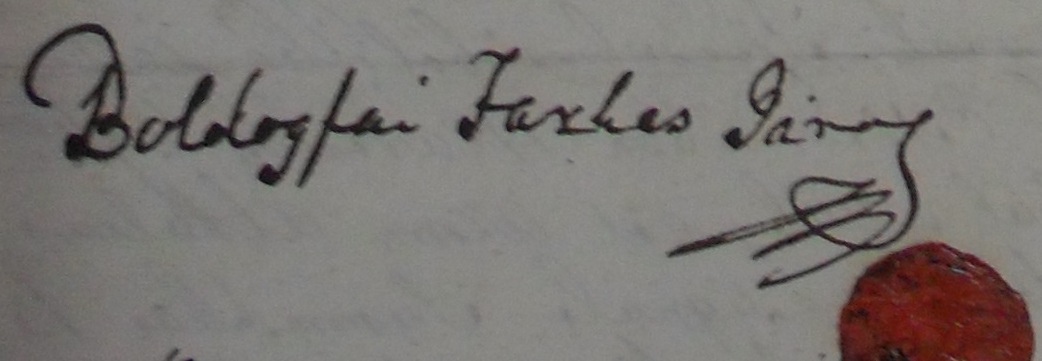
- Signature

János Nepomuk Farkas de Boldogfa (6 June 1774 – 5 May 1847) was a Hungarian nobleman, jurist, landowner, vice-ispán of the county of Zala (alispán of Zala) between 1832 and 1835.

== Biography ==
Coat of arms of the noble family Farkas de Boldogfa

Born in Zalaboldogfa in the county of Zala, located in south-western region of the former Kingdom of Hungary, he was member of the ancient Roman Catholic Hungarian noble family Farkas de Boldogfa (in Hungarian: boldogfai Farkas család). His father was János Farkas de Boldogfa (1741–1788), jurist, lawyer, landowner, Prothonotary of the county of Zala. His mother was Judith Sümeghy de Lovász et Szentmargitha (1754–1820), member of a prominent noble family of the same county. His paternal grandparents were Ferenc Farkas de Boldogfa (1713–1770), jurist, landowner, vice-ispán of the county of Zala (alispán of Zala) and lady Anna Maria Rosty de Barkócz (1722–1784). His maternal grandparents were the nobleman Ferenc Sümeghy, jurist, landowner, and Marianna Póka de Pókafalva (1728–1797).

After finishing his basic studies, he finished law in the Royal Academy of Law of Győr. Between 1803 and 1809 he was the substitute of the chief magistrate of the district of Zalaegerszeg (alszolgabíró). Occupying this office, in 1809 he took a very active part in the defense of the county against the invader Napoleonic troops during the Napoleonic Wars. Years after the end of the wars, he bought the neighbor states of Alsóbagod and Felsőbagod, leaving the ancestral state of Zalaboldogfa and the mansion to his younger brother Ferenc Farkas de Boldogfa (1779–1844).

János and his brother Ferenc were good friends of Ferenc Deák, and also shared his political views. On 1833 János Nepomuk was elected by the county's nobility as the vice-ispán of the county of Zala (alispán of Zala), because the incumbent of the office Antal Deák got sick. This office was the second most important in the administration and ruling of the Hungarian county system. János Nepomuk Farkas de Boldogfa directed the administrative and judicial part of the county for more than two years, and consumed Deák's plans for canalizing the lakes of Szévizi and also the drying and changing the course of the rivers and modifying the ponds of Szentmihály, Pölöske, Fakos, Pötréte and Hahót.

== Marriage and children ==
He married on 1811 the Hungarian noble lady Angéla Cecilia Skublics Besenyő et Velike (1775–1839), daughter of János Skublics Besenyő et Velike (1738–1808), judge, landowner, and Erzsébet Csapody de Zalalövő (1739–1781). Angéla Skublics gave to János Farkas de Boldogfa three children: one of them was Imre Farkas de Boldogfa (1811–1876), chief magistrate of the district (főszolgabíró) of Zalaegerszeg, landowner, who was the father of József Farkas de Boldogfa (1857–1951), landowner, politician, Member of the Hungarian Parliament.

== Bibliography ==
- Fónagy Zoltán. (2013). A Nemesi Birtokviszonyok az Úrbérendezés Korában. Adattár I. MTA. Budapest. 651.p.
- Molnár András. A fiatal Deák Ferenc. (2003). Osiris. 260. p.
- Molnár András. (2000) Zala megye archontológiája 1338–2000. Zalaegerszeg. (255. p.)
- Szluha Márton (2012) Vas vármegye nemes családjai II kötet. Heraldika kiadó. (401. p.)
