= Farkas de Boldogfa =

Hungarian noble family

Coat of arms of the family Farkas de Boldogfa

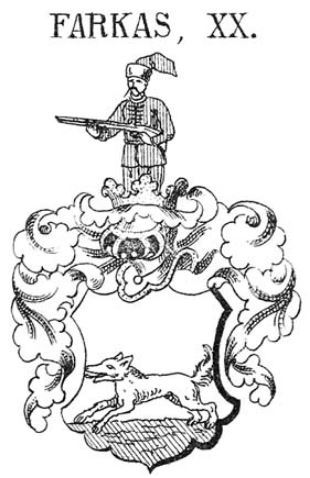
Coat of arms of the family Farkas de Boldogfa taken from the Siebmachers Wappenbuch

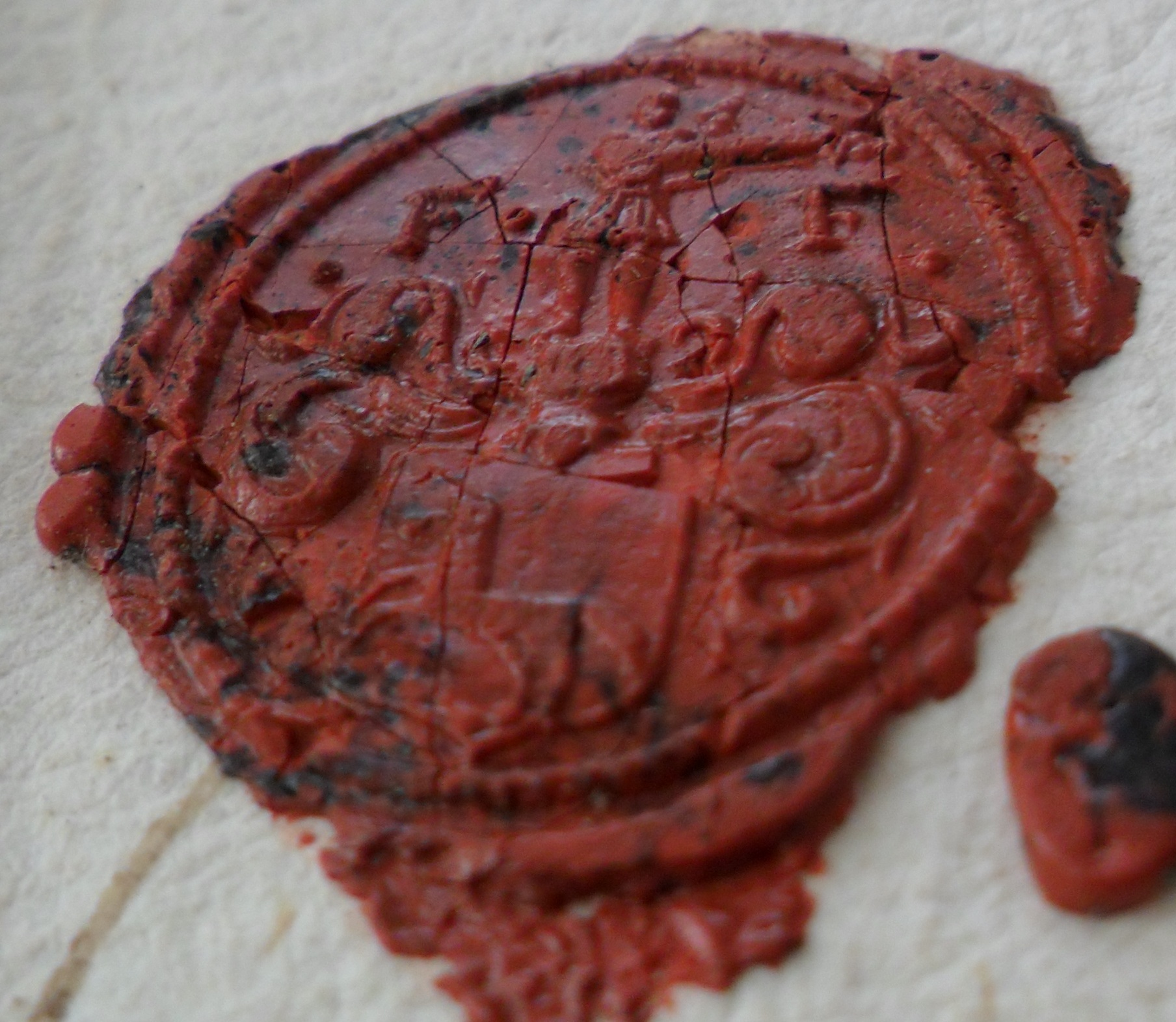
Wax seal of Ferenc Farkas de Boldogfa (1713–1770), vice-ispán (alispán) of the county of Zala with the Coat of arms of the family Farkas de Boldogfa.

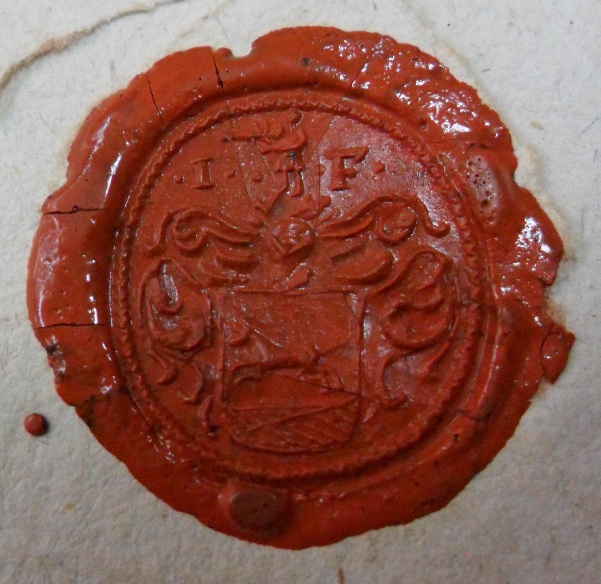
Wax seal of János Farkas de Boldogfa (1741–1788), Prothonotary of the county of Zala, president of the Supreme court of Zala County with the Coat of arms of the family Farkas de Boldogfa.

The Farkas de Boldogfa family (Hungarian: boldogfai Farkas család; German: Farkas von Boldogfa) were a Hungarian noble family. Their members were landowners that occupied diverse roles in the political, administrative, and jurisdictional life in the county of Zala, located in the former Kingdom of Hungary, throughout the last 400 years. Amongst other roles, they held offices as vice-ispáns (alispán) of the county of Zala, acted as prothonotary of the county of Zala, were members of the Hungarian Parliament, chief magistrates of the county's districts (főszolgabíró), and served as Hussars.

== The family's origins ==
Their early ancestors were Roman Catholic border guards that lived in the towns of Unterwart (Hungarian: Alsóőrs) and Oberwart (Hungarian: Felsőőrs) in the Vas county of Hungary, in the small region known as Upper Őrség; they received nobility privileges during the reign of the King Béla IV of Hungary in the 13th century, after the Mongol invasion of 1241. These privileges were confirmed by the Kings Stephen V of Hungary and Ladislaus IV of Hungary. On July 1 1327, King Charles I of Hungary granted nobility to the Farkas family, and to all the border guards that lived in these two towns. The noble family possessed small lands through the end of the Medieval period and lost a considerable amount of wealth during the Turkish invasions in the 16th century. On February 18 1582, Rudolf II, Holy Romar, King of Hungary, gave them the states of Unterwart and Oberwart. This donation was confirmed by Matthias, Holy Roman Emperor, King of Hungary, on 16 February 1611.

Their descendant, the nobleman János Farkas de Alsóeőr, who lived at the start of the 17th century, was a landowner in Kančevci (Hungarian: Felsőszentbenedek), located in Vas county. János Farkas de Alsóeőr had two sons: Lukács Farkas de Alsóeőr and Péter Farkas de Alsóeőr (fl. 1656). Péter Farkas rented a small estate in Pórszombat, located in the County of Zala. Péter's son, Mihály Farkas de Alsóeőr (fl. 1656–1664), who fought against the Turkish invaders, bought the states in Zalaboldogfa (Boldogfa), in Zala county during the second half of the 17th century. Mihály Farkas married a local noblewoman, Éva Péter de Ságod, who gave birth to three sons: János Farkas de Boldogfa, Péter Farkas de Boldogfa and István Farkas de Boldogfa. This branch of this Farkas family later used the nobiliary particle of "de Boldogfa", as they received a royal donation of the state of Boldogfa from Charles VI, Holy Roman Emperor, King of Hungary, on 22 March 1716. The descendants of Lukács Farkas used the nobiliary particle "de Alsóeőr", in honor of original state the family originally hailed from. On April 2 1690, the noble Farkas family that lived in Kančevci received the donation of a coat of arms from the King Leopold I of Hungary; this coat of arms was used by both the Farkas de Boldogfa and the Farkas de Alsóőeőr.

== Farkas de Boldogfa ==
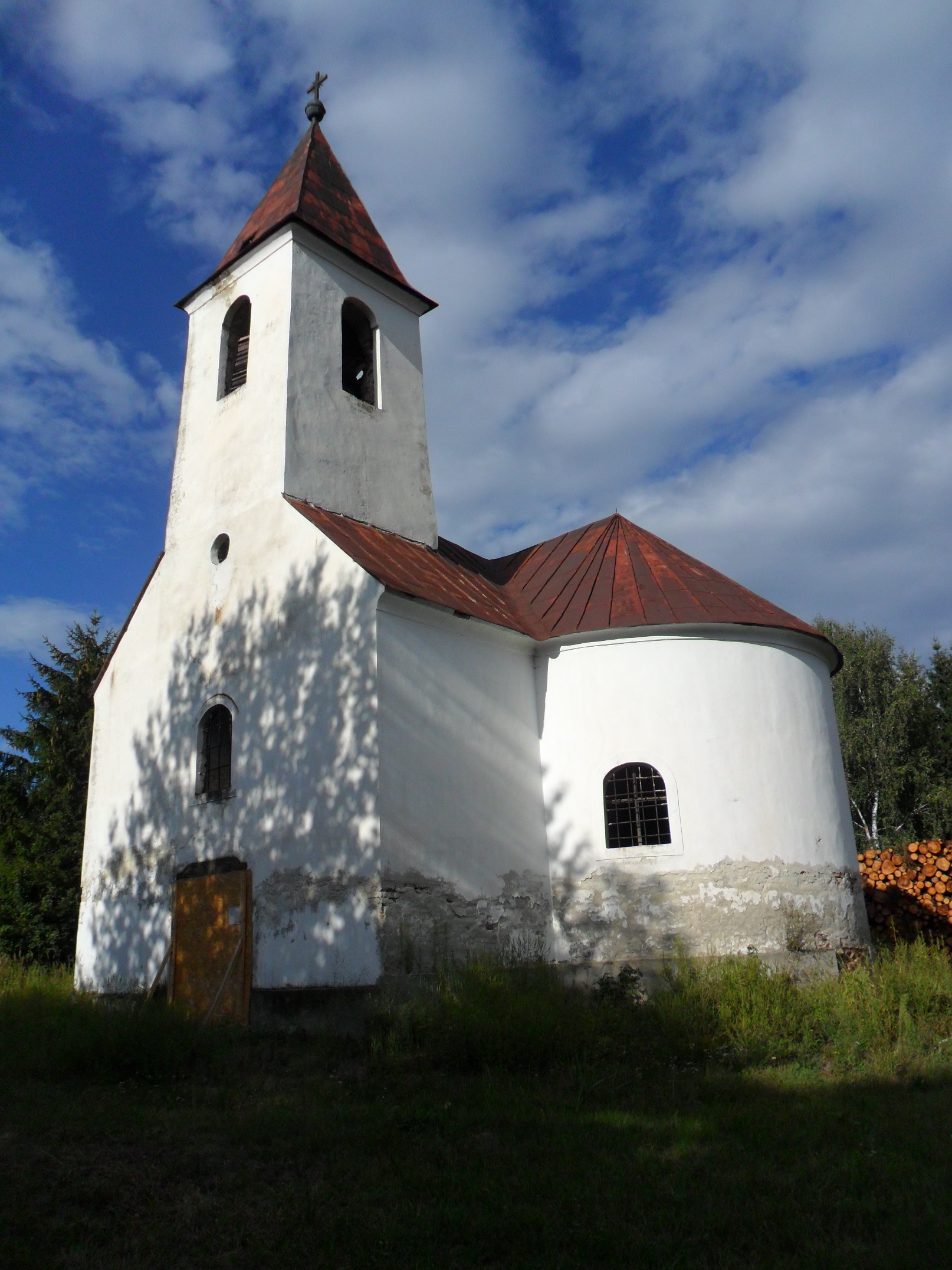
The baroque chapel and crypt of the family Farkas de Boldogfa built by Ferenc Farkas de Boldogfa vice-ispán of Zala county, which is located in Zélpuszta.

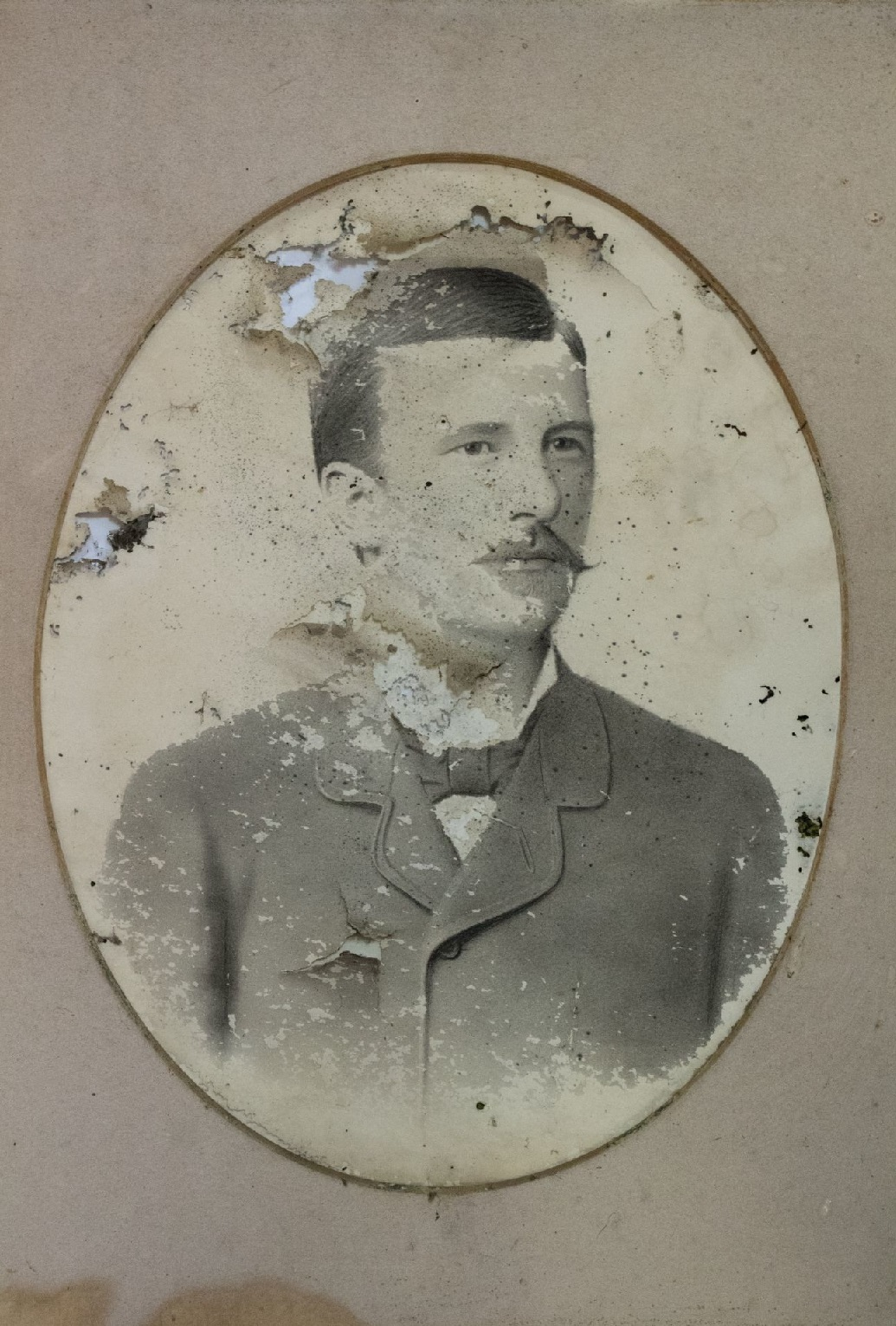
Imre Farkas de Boldogfa (1811–1876), jurist, landowner, chief magistrate of the district of Zalaegerszeg

The youngest son of Mihály Farkas and Éva Péter de Ságod was János Farkas de Boldogfa (d.1724), who became a jurist and had lands in Andráshida, Boldogfa and Alibánfa. He occupied the office of chief magistrate of the district of Zalaegerszeg between 1712 and 1721, and he was the first one who used the nobiliary particle "de Boldogfa". János Farkas de Boldogfa married Dorottya Sidy de Sid (1693–1775), the daughter of Mihály Sidy de Sid (fl. 1672–1711), landowner and vice-captain of the castle of Egervár, and the noblewoman Maria Terjék de Szenterzsébet (fl. 1688–1692). The only son of János Farkas and Dorottya Sidy was Ferenc Farkas de Boldogfa (1713–1770), also a renowned jurist in Zala county. Aside from the states he received from his father's patrimony, he also inherited states in Teskánd and Salomvár from his mother's side. Ferenc Farkas held the office of vice-ispán (alispán) of the county of Zala between 1761 and 1769, and was one of the wealthiest landlords in the Zala county during Empress Maria Theresa's era, having in total 70 families of serfs throughout his lands. His fortune increased considerably with his marriage to lady Anna Mária Rosty de Barkócz (1722–1784), who was the daughter of László Rosty de Barkócz, chief magistrate (főszolgabíró) of Vas county and Mária Csapody de Zalalövő. Her maternal grandparents were István Csapody de Zalalövő (fl. 1663–1702), landowner and captain of the fortress of Zalalövő, and Zsófia Perneszy de Osztopán (fl. 1651–1702), member of the ancient Hungarian noble family Perneszy de Osztopán. The illustrious noble family Rosty de Barkócz was well known, wealthy and took part in the politics and arts in the last centuries. Ferenc Farkas de Boldogfa inherited several states in Zala through his wife which originally belonged during the Medieval Times to the ancient and prestigious families Pogány de Cséb, Perneszy de Osztopán, Batthyány, and Both de Bajna, all ancestors of the noble lady Anna Rosty de Barkócz. After the War of the Austrian Succession began, in 1741 the Hungarian nobility assisted in fight Maria Theresa of Austria: Ferenc Farkas helped in the coordination of the Hungarian noblemen's organization within the county of Zala for this occasion. Ferenc Farkas de Boldogfa refurbished and expanded the Roman Catholic church of Zalaboldogfa also donating constantly to the local parish; he also built the Roman Catholic family burial chapel in his state of on Zélpuszta, also located in the county of Zala. Ferenc Farkas de Boldogfa's brother in law was Ferenc Rosty de Barkócz (1718–1790), royal counselor of Queen Maria Theresa, vice-ispán of the Vas county, and a wealthy landowner (Ferenc Rosty was the great-grandfather of Pál Rosty de Barkócz and also of Ágnes Rosty de Barkócz, who was the mother of the baron Loránd Eötvös).

Among the children of Ferenc Farkas de Boldogfa and Anna Rosty, two became priests: Ferenc Farkas de Boldogfa (1742–1807), a Jesuit priest, who was the master canon of the Diocese of Veszprém, and József Farkas de Boldogfa (1752–1809) Piarist priest, rector of the Piarist convent of Kolozsvár. Another of their children was János Farkas de Boldogfa (1741–1788), jurist, lawyer, landowner, Prothonotary of the county of Zala between 1773 and 1786. During the reign of Joseph II, Holy Roman Emperor, also King of Hungary, he started several legal modifications in the structure of the counties in Hungary. He separated the administrative and judicial office of alispán (chief deputy of the county), and created a new post that will administrate the judicial matters in the whole county. The new office was called "President of the Judiciary See of Zala county" (Latin: "Inclyti Sedis Iudiciaria Comitatus Szaladiensis Praeses") and when it was created in 1787 János Farkas de Boldogfa was appointed to it. He held it only until 1788 when he died. János Farkas de Boldogfa is the common ancestor of the family's two branches that exist until the present time. János Farkas' wife was the noble lady Judith Sümeghy de Lovász et Szentmargit (1754–1820), daughter of Ferenc Sümeghy and Marianna Póka de Pókafalva (1728–1797), a wealthy landowrd in Zala county, who was descendant on mother side of a branch of the Nádasdy family, Csányi family, Tarródy family, Meszlény family, and several other illustrious Hungarian noble families. The brother in law of János Farkas de Boldogfa was József Sümeghy de Lovász et Szentmargita (1757–1832), royal counselor of Francis II, Holy Roman Emperor; József Sümeghy was vice-ispán of the county of Zala between 1797 and 1815, and also a wealthy landowner.

=== János' branch ===
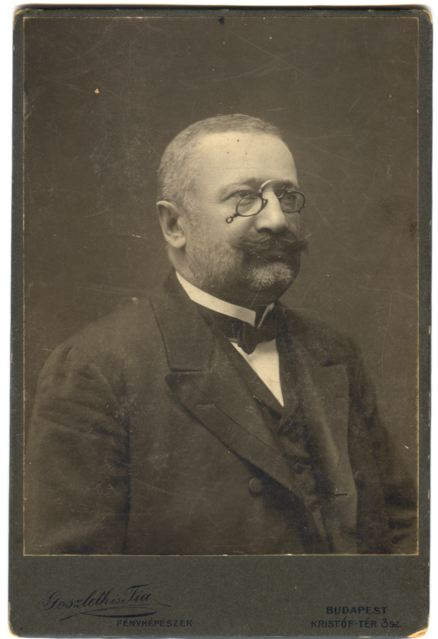
József Farkas de Boldogfa (1857–1951), politician, Member of the Hungarian Parliament, landowner.

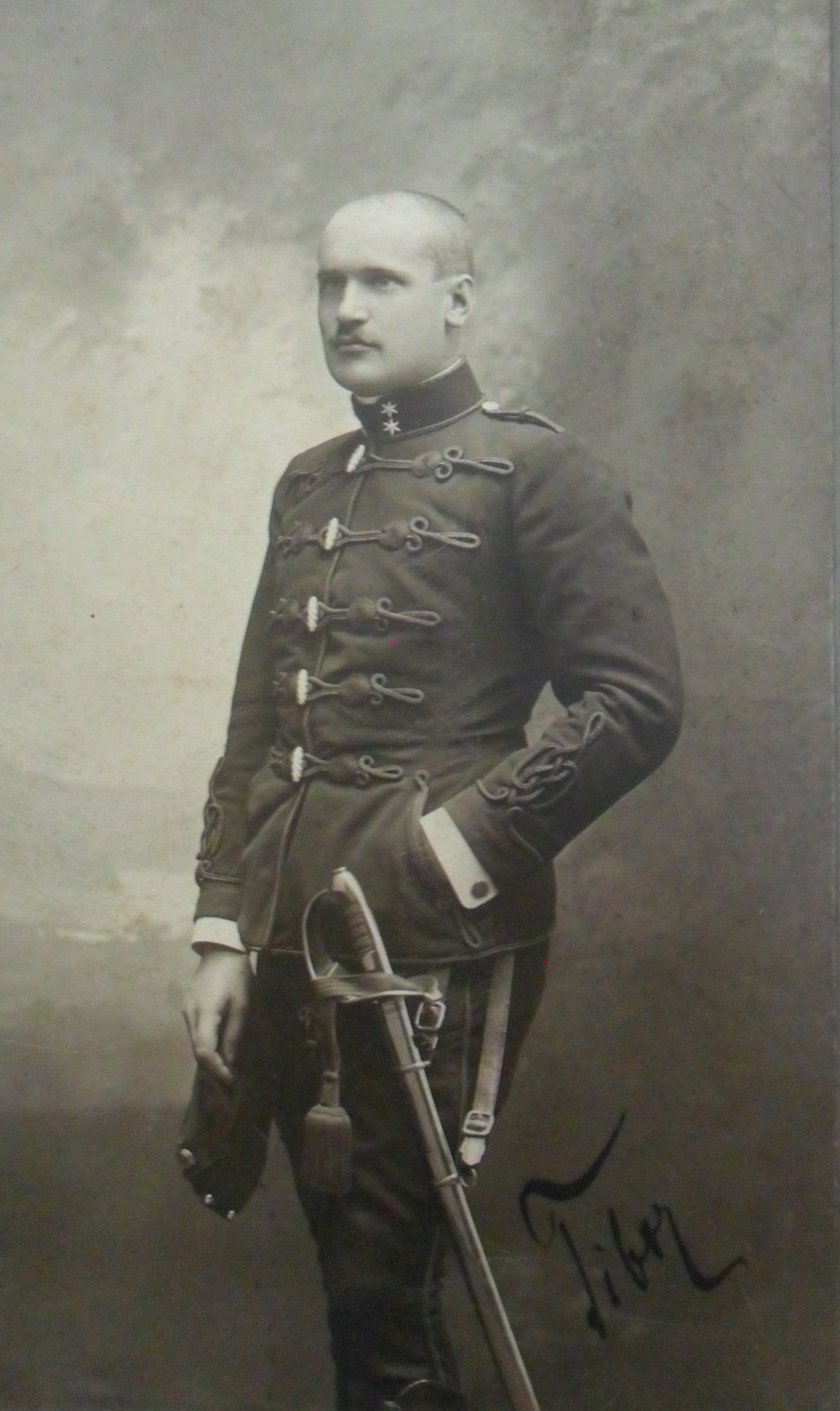
Dr. Tibor Farkas de Boldogfa (1884–1940) politician, Member of the Hungarian Parliament, landowner, wearing his Hussar Captain uniform.

The other son of János Farkas de Boldogfa and Judit Sümeghy de Lovász et Szentmargita was János Nepomuk Farkas de Boldogfa (1774–1847), jurist, landowner and vice-ispán of the county of Zala, who married the Hungarian noble lady Angéla Cecilia Skublics Besenyő et Velike (1775–1839). Their oldest son was Imre Farkas de Boldogfa (1811–1876), jurist, landowner and chief magistrate of the district of Zalaegerszeg. He married very late to Alojzia Horváth with which he had three children. One of the sons of Imre Farkas de Boldogfa and Alojzia Horváth was József Farkas de Boldogfa (1857–1951), jurist, landowner and politician. József Farkas de Boldogfa was elected as representative in the Hungarian Parliament for 4 terms: 1896–1901, 1901–1905, 1905–1906, and 1906–1910. József Farkas de Boldogfa was very active in the Hungarian politics since the 1890s, working along with count Aladár Zichy, and count Nándor Zichy within the newly created Hungarian Katolikus Néppárt (Catholic People's Party). He served as his only representative in Zala county and he was one of his greatest supporters.

József Farkas de Boldogfa married the noble lady Rozália Sümeghy de Lovász et Szentmargitha (1857–1924), who gave birth to three sons. One of them was Tibor Farkas de Boldogfa (1883–1940), who finished his general studies of school and high-school with particular teachers and in the Theresianum in Vienna. Later Tibor studied law in Wien and in Budapest, where he obtained his PhD degree and passed his lawyer exam in 1910. Then he traveled to England and studied law at Cambridge University for 3 years. He also taught law in the London School of Economics. During World War I, Tibor Farkas fought in the front as a Hussar Captain. After the end of the war, he became one of the most energetic defenders of the Monarchy and of the House of Habsburg in Zala county and Hungary itself. Tibor had a close friendship with the Marquis György Pallavicini, the Count Antal Sigray and Count János Zichy, who were the most relevant legitimist politicians between the two World Wars in Hungary. He was elected two times as a representative in the Hungarian Parliament: 1922–1926, and 1931–1935. He strongly criticized the government of prime minister count István Bethlen and the high cult of regent Miklós Horthy, considering that these demonstrations of honor and respect actually belonged to the Hungarian King, who was not sitting in the throne for that time. Tibor Farkas also was against all Nazi politics; his only goal was to reestablish continuity and see the Habsburgs in the Hungarian throne, and ensure the healthy development and growing of Hungarian agriculturists' way of life. The youngest son of József Farkas and Rozália Sümeghy was Dénes Farkas de Boldogfa (1884–1973), landowner, politician, member of the Hungarian Parliament, who took part of the Hungarian Revolution of 1956.

=== Ferenc's branch ===
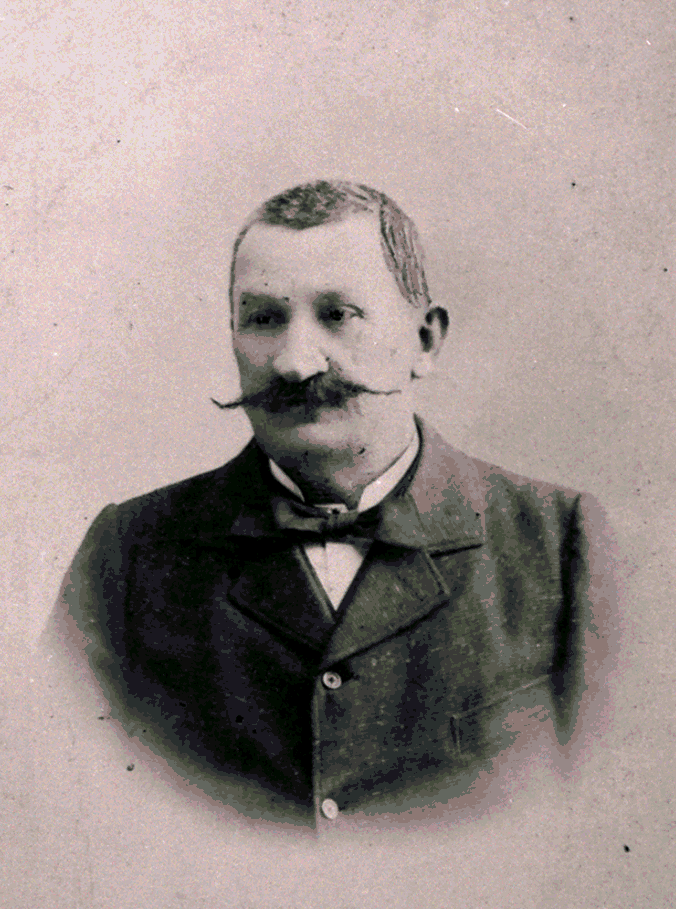
Ferenc Farkas de Boldogfa (1838–1908), landowner, Zala county auditor and monetary comptroller of the county

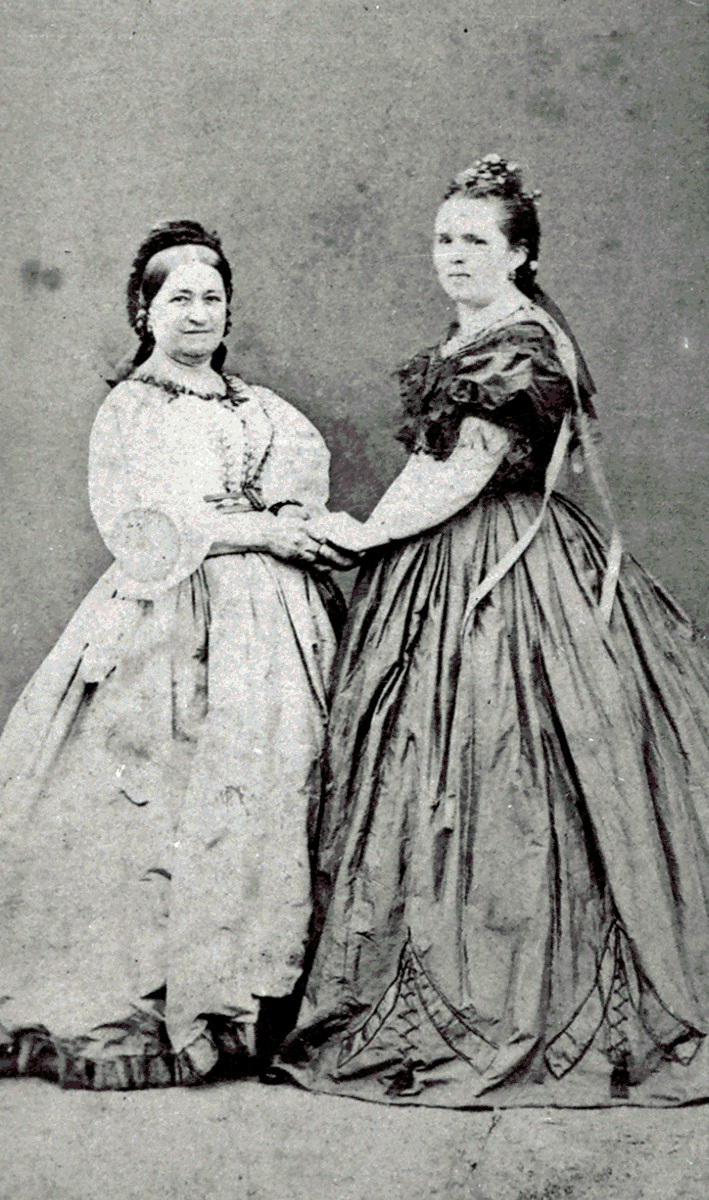
Zsófia Marton de Nemesnép (1842–1900) (right), wife of Ferenc Farkas de Boldogfa (1838–1908), and her mother Rozália Szluha de Verbó (1816–1883) (left), widow of József Marton de Nemesnép (1797–1858)

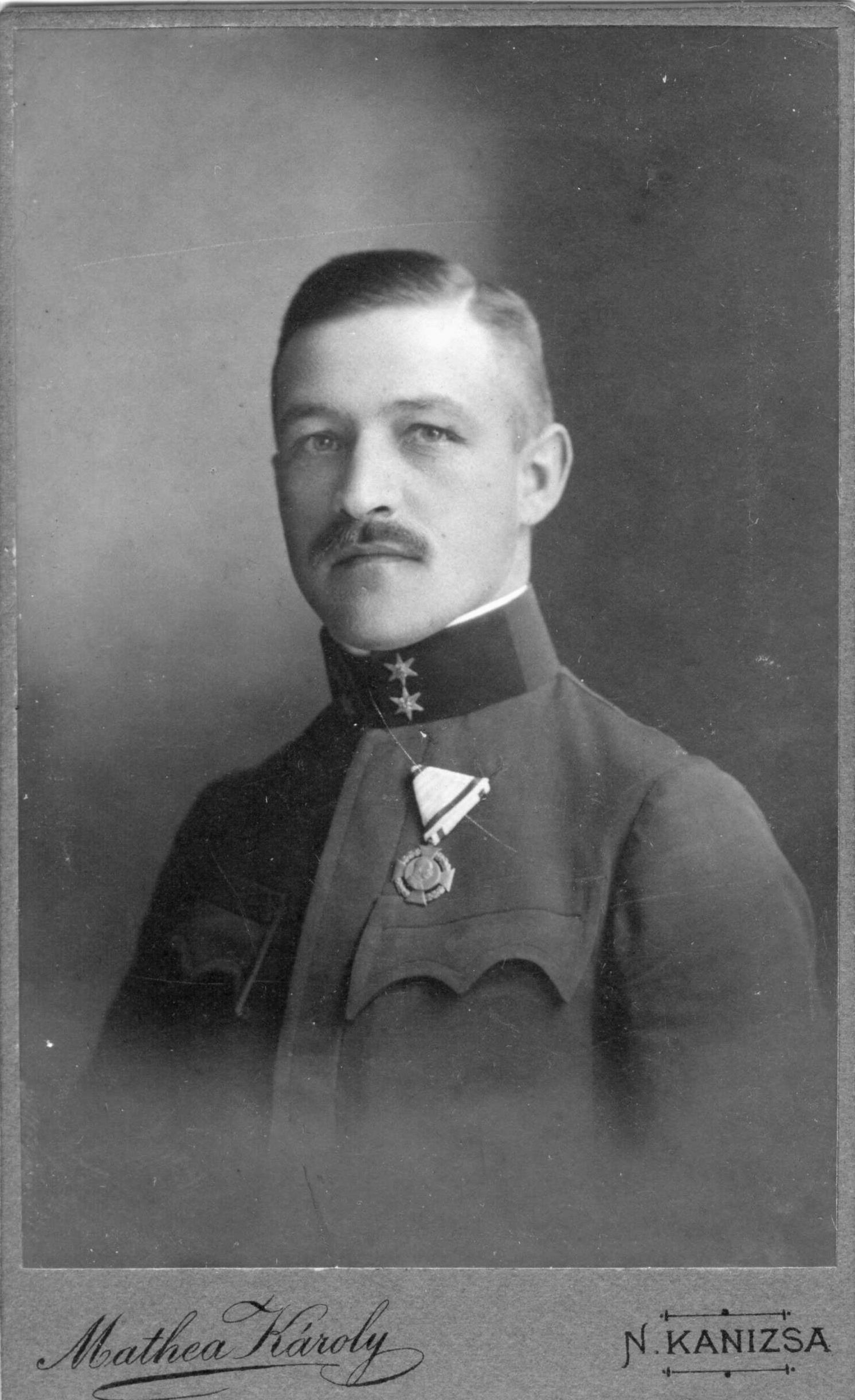
Vitéz Sándor Farkas de Boldogfa (1880– 1946), colonel of the Kingdom of Hungary, captain of the Order of Vitéz of the county of Zala. He was knight of the Order of the Iron Crown

One of the children of János Farkas de Boldogfa and Judit Sümeghy de Lovász et Szentmargita was Ferenc Farkas de Boldogfa (1779–1844), landowner, jurist, judge. He married at a very late age and had five children with Borbála Joó (1811–1881). Their eldest son was Ferenc Farkas de Boldogfa (1838–1908), landowner, Zala county auditor and monetary comptroller of the county. Ferenc Farkas de Boldogfa took an active role in Zala county's society. He was one of the first local supporters of the introduction of fire-fighting and he even assisted personally on several occasions to put out fires. On 2 December 1883 he was elected vice auditor of Zala county. He was one of the first members of the agricultural circle of Zala when it was founded in 1887. On 5 October 1890 he was appointed as honorary auditor of Zala county. On 29 December 1901 Ferenc Farkas de Boldogfa was elected as a juryman of the county. On 2 December 1904 he was appointed as the monetary comptroller of Zala county by the Kingdom's minister of finance. Ferenc Farkas also was a great supporter of the political Party of Independence and '48, and had great respect for Lajos Kossuth. His wife was the noble lady Zsófia Marton de Nemesnép (1842–1900), whose father was József Marton de Nemesnép (1797–1858), landowner in Andráshida, and vice chief magistrate of the district of Zalalövő (alszolgabíró).

Four children were born from the marriage of Ferenc Farkas de Boldogfa and Zsófia Marton de Nemesnép. The oldest one was Dr. István Farkas de Boldogfa (1875–1921) who finished his studies of law on 25 June 1901 in the Franz Joseph University of Cluj-Napoca (Hungarian: Kolozsvár). He was elected supreme chief magistrate of district of Sümeg in 1911 and held that office until 1919. István Farkas de Boldogfa had two wives: the first one was the noble lady Erzsébet Persay de Persa (1885–1913), daughter of Gyula Persay de Persa (1855–1924), pharmacist, landowner, director of the Savings Bank of Nova, and Erzsébet Kiss de Nemeskér (1867–1888). István Farkas' second wife was the noblewoman Johanna Horváth de Pósfa (1883–1919), daughter of János Horváth de Pósfa (1839–1923), director of the engine factory of the company Hungarian State Railways, Knight of Order of Franz Joseph, and Irma Forintos de Forintosháza (1860–1916). From his first marriage three children were born; among them was Endre Farkas de Boldogfa (1908–1994), Major of the General Staff of the Hungarian Armies during World War II. He was Head of the National Mobility Department at the Ministry of Public Supply during the war.

In 1942, Endre Farkas de Boldogfa married the wealthy Roman Catholic Gobelin tapestry artist Klára Lenz (1924–2013), member of the high Bourgeoisie of Budapest. After the marriage Endre Farkas de Boldogfa became landlord at Tiszadob owning an estate of 1000 hectares. Both Endre and Klára later emigrated to Venezuela after the World War II. Klára Lenz's father was József Lenz (1897–1965), a wealthy Hungarian landowner, tradesman of exotic fruits, Hussar captain of the Royal Hungarian Army. József Lenz was the owner of 12 urban palaces in Budapest and built up and donated the only Roman Catholic church of Nyékládháza in 1943; for this charitable gesture the Pope Pius XII decorated József Lenz with the "Pro Ecclesia et Pontifice". Klára Lenz's mother was Klara Topits (1901–1993), daughter of the member of the high Bourgeoisie of Budapest, Alajos József Topits (1855–1926), owner and director of the pasta factory "Son of Joseph Topits" (Topits József fia) located in Budapest (which was the first pasta factory of the Kingdom); Alajos Topits was also Knight of the Order of Franz Joseph, and member of the Industrial Council of Hungary from 1893.

The youngest son of Ferenc Farkas de Boldogfa and Zsófia Marton de Nemsnép was Vitéz Sándor Farkas de Boldogfa (1880 –1946), a colonel of the Kingdom of Hungary. He was appointed as General Captain of the Order of Vitéz of the county of Zala in 1935. He occupied the office until 1939, when he resigned because of serious health problems. He was a close friend of the Count Béla Teleki de Szék (1896–1969), who was the lord-lieutenant of Zala county (zalai főispán). Sándor Farkas de Boldogfa was also knight of the Order of the Austrian Iron Crown. On 22 September 1920 Sándor Farkas de Boldogfa married the noble lady Katalin Csomasz de Adorjánháza (1897–1964), who played also an important social role during the World War II in the county of Zala, as she was the president of the Hungarian Red Cross of the county, and other organizations as well. The couple had two sons: Lóránd and Tamás.

== Notable members ==
- Ferenc Farkas de Boldogfa (1713–1770), jurist, landowner, vice-ispán (alispán) of the county of Zala.
- János Farkas de Boldogfa (1741–1788), jurist, lawyer, landowner, Prothonotary of the county of Zala.
- Ferenc Farkas de Boldogfa (1742–1807) Jesuit priest, parish priest of Nemesapáti, poet, master canon of the Diocese of Veszprém.
- József Farkas de Boldogfa (1752–1809) Piarist priest, rector of the Piarist convent of Kolozsvár.
- János Nepomuk Farkas de Boldogfa (1774–1847), jurist, landowner, vice-ispán of the county of Zala.
- Imre Farkas de Boldogfa (1811–1876), jurist, landowner, chief magistrate (főszolgabíró) of the district of Zalaegerszeg.
- Ferenc Farkas de Boldogfa (1838–1908), economist, landowner, Zala county auditor and monetary comptroller of the county.
- József Farkas de Boldogfa (1857–1951), jurist, landowner, politician, Member of the Hungarian Parliament.
- Dr. István Farkas de Boldogfa (1875–1921), jurist, supreme chief magistrate of district of Sümeg in the county of Zala.
- Vitéz Sándor Farkas de Boldogfa (1880–1946), colonel of the Kingdom of Hungary, captain of the Order of Vitéz of the county of Zala. He was knight of the Austrian Order of the Iron Crown
- Kálmán Farkas de Boldogfa (1880–1944), landowner, supreme chief magistrate of the district of Zalaszentgrót in the county of Zala.
- Dr. Tibor Farkas de Boldogfa (1883–1940), jurist, landowner, politician, member of the Hungarian Parliament, Hussar Captain. He was a respected Hungarian legitimist politician.
- Dénes Farkas de Boldogfa (1884–1973), landowner, politician, member of the Hungarian Parliament.
- Sándor Boldogfai Farkas (1907–1970), Hungarian sculptor, medalist.
- Endre Farkas de Boldogfa (1908–1994), Major of the General Staff of the Hungarian Armies during World War II, a prominent member of the Venezuelan-Hungarian community. His wife was Klára Lenz (1924–2013), a Hungarian Gobelin tapestry artist.

== Main alliances ==
- Baranyay de Baranyavár
- Baranyay de Kurtakesz
- Bertha de Felsőőr
- Csákány de Léczfalva
- Csány de Csány
- Csillagh de Csáford
- Csomasz de Adorjánháza
- Dóczy de Muzsaj
- Dulánszky de Doliánszk
- Egressy de Boszörcsök
- Forintos de Forintosháza
- Gaál de Gyula
- Hajgató de Boldogfa
- Hertelendy de Hertelend
- Horváth de Pósfa
- Jagasics de Lovász
- Mátay de Máta
- Marton de Nemesnép
- Móricz de Técső
- Miklós de Dálnok
- Nagy de Szotyor
- Pálffy de Pálfiszegh
- Persay de Persa
- Péter de Ságod
- Rosty de Barkóc
- Sartory de Derzs et Besztercebánya
- Sidy de Sid
- Sümeghy de Lovász et Szentmargitha
- Skublics de Besenyő et Velike
- Svastics de Bocsár
- Szladovits de Szladeovic
- Strausz de Strauszenbergh
- Szűcs de Szentjános
- Tóth de Tóthfalu
- Tuboly de Tubolyszegh
- Udvardy de Udvard et Básth
- Viosz de Nemesvita
