= István Farkas de Boldogfa =

Hungarian nobleman

dr. István Farkas de Boldogfa
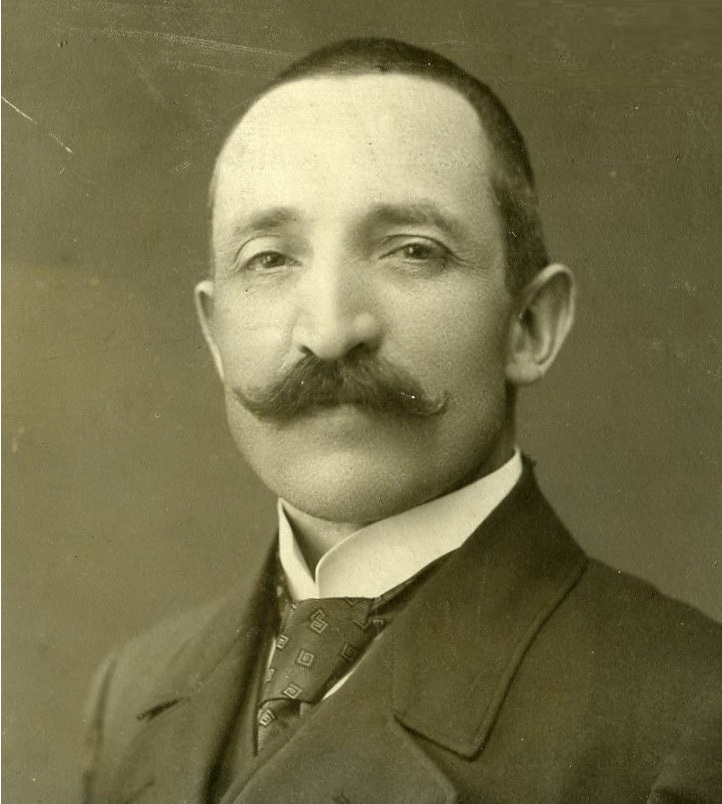

jurist, supreme chief magistrate of district of Sümeg

Personal details
- Born: July 11, 1875 Zalaboldogfa, county of Zala
- Died: January 6, 1921 (aged 45) Budapest
- Profession: Jurist

Dr. István Farkas de Boldogfa (July 11, 1875 – January 6, 1921) was a Hungarian nobleman, jurist of the Kingdom of Hungary, supreme chief magistrate of district of Sümeg (Hungarian: főszolgabíró) in the county of Zala.

== Life ==
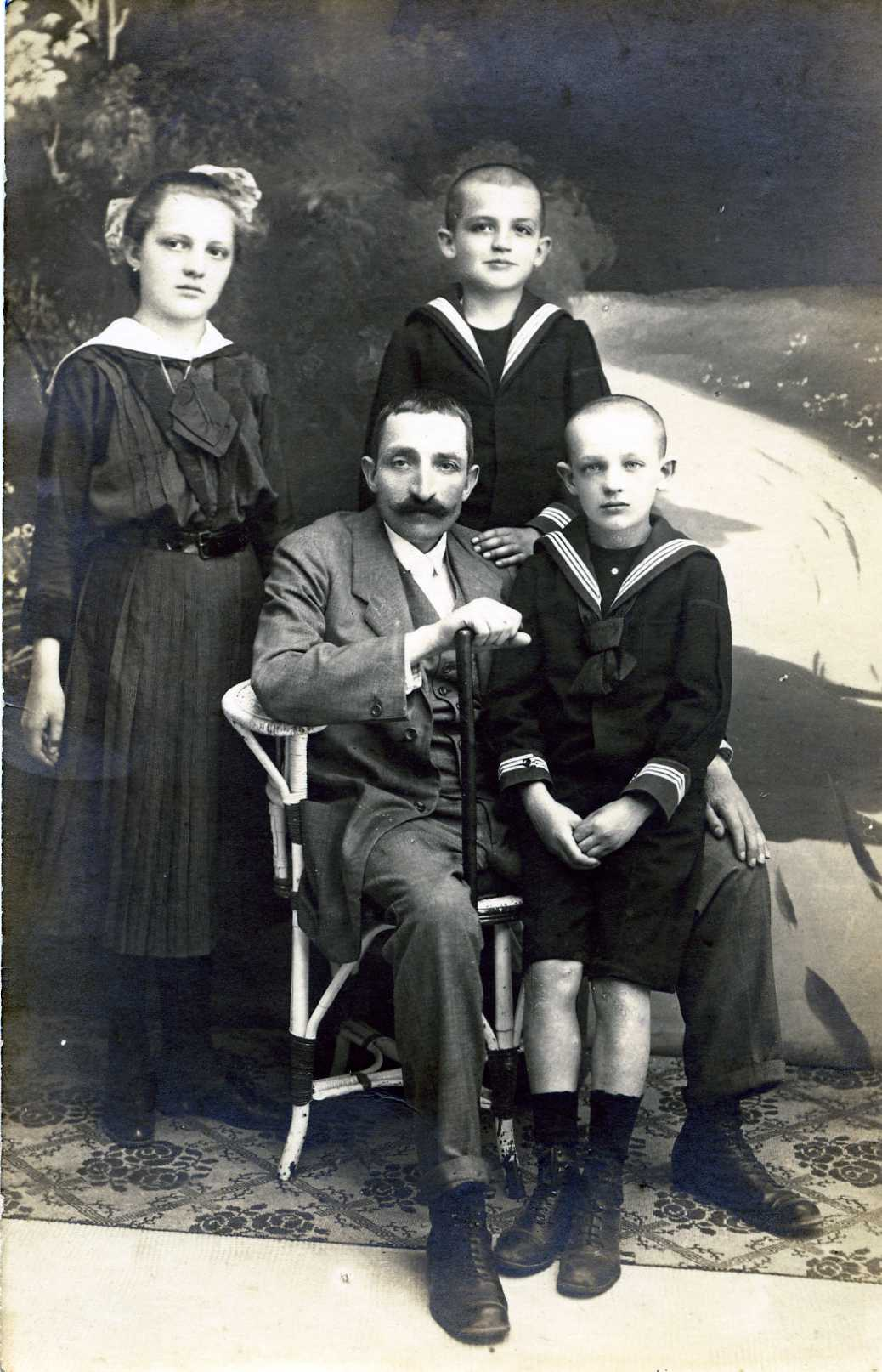
Dr. István Farkas de Boldogfa and his three children from his first marriage in 1914, shortly after the death of his first wife

Born in Zalaboldogfa in the county of Zala, in the former Kingdom of Hungary, István Imre (English: Stephen Emeric), descended from the ancient Roman Catholic Hungarian noble family Farkas de Boldogfa (in Hungarian: boldogfai Farkas család). He was son of Ferenc Farkas de Boldogfa (1838–1908), landowner, Zala county auditor and monetary comptroller of the county, and the noble lady Zsófia Marton de Nemesnép (1842–1900). His paternal grandparents were Ferenc Farkas de Boldogfa (1779–1844), judge, landowner, and Borbála Joó (1817–1881). His maternal grandparents were the Hungarian nobleman József Marton de Nemesnép (1797–1858), deputy-noble judge (Hungarian: alszolgabíró), jurist, landowner in Zala county, and Rozália Szluha de Verbó (1816–1883). His great grandfather was János Farkas de Boldogfa (1741–1788), jurist, lawyer, landowner, Prothonotary of the county of Zala. István's brother was vitéz Sándor Farkas de Boldogfa (1880–1946), colonel of the Kingdom of Hungary, captain of the Order of Vitéz of the county of Zala, knight of the Order of the Iron Crown. Their second cousin was József Farkas de Boldogfa (1857–1951), landowner, politician, Member of the Hungarian Parliament.

István Farkas de Boldogfa finished his studies of law on June 25, 1901, in the Franz Joseph University of Cluj-Napoca (Hungarian: Kolozsvár). On December 8 he was appointed honorary chief magistrate of district in the Zala County. On December 16 he became the substitute chief magistrate of district of Tapolca. He occupied the same office during the following 10 years but in different districts within Zala, for example Alsólendva, and Nova, until he was elected supreme chief magistrate of district of Sümeg (Hungarian: főszolgabíró) in 1911. István ran the investigation, controlling and ceasing of the Epidemic of Dysentery that took many lives in the district of Sümeg in 1911. He had a strong hand controlling the cleanness of the public establishments and areas of the city and the district, what gain him a good name and respect among the locals.

He organized a charity ball on February 1, 1912, to obtain funds for creating the sculpture of the Hungarian Martyr of the Hungarian Revolution of 1848 named László Csány, who was from Zala county. In the same year, he founded a Farmer Circle in Sümeg, what served for helping improve in the smallest agricultors' techniques in Zala. During the First World War, in 1917, the great alimentary crisis allowed several merchants a sellers to increase the prices of the food and products on the local markets. Controlling this situation, he put order regulating the prices. During the War after his services as the administrator of the District of Sümeg, he received the War Cross for Civil Merits and also a diploma of merit from the Hungarian Red cross.

During the Hungarian Soviet Republic of 1919, he was attacked by a riot that broke into his residence in Sümeg and severely beat him. After this he renounced to his office and then died a year later in 1921 in the Saint John Hospital of Budapest.

== Marriages and children ==
István Farkas de Boldogfa had two wives. He married his first wife in February 11, 1903, in Nova; she was the noble lady Erzsébet Persay de Persa (1885–1913), daughter of Gyula Persay de Persa (1855–1924), pharmacist, landowner, director of the Savings Bank of Nova, and Erzsébet Kiss de Nemeskér (1867–1888). Her paternal grandparents were János Persay de Persa (1813–1870), landowner in Áporka, and Terézia Szalay de Tornócz (1819–1857); her maternal grandparents were the nobleman István Kiss de Nemeskér (1833–1884), pharmacist, pharmacy owner in Nemesvid and Marcali, and Alojzia Schandl (1837–1915). From his first marriage with Erzsébet Persay de Persa three children were born; among them was Endre Farkas de Boldogfa (1908–1994), Major of the General Staff of the Hungarian Armies during World War II, who married the daughter of a member from a wealthy Hungarian family of the Budapest's Bourgeoisie, the Gobelin tapestry artist Klára Lenz (1924–2013).

István Farkas' second wife was the noble lady Johanna Horváth de Pósfa (1883–1919), daughter of János Horváth de Pósfa (1839–1923), director of the engine factory of the company Hungarian State Railways, Knight of Order of Franz Joseph, and Irma Forintos de Forintosháza (1860–1916), whom he married in July 25, 1914, in Mihályfa. Her paternal grandparents were György Horváth de Pósfa (1801–1872), lawyer, landowner and the noble lady Emília Fleischhacker (1813–1863). Her maternal grandparents were Kálmán Forintos de Forintosháza (1834–1903), deputy-noble judge (Hungarian: alszolgabíró), landowner, and the noble lady Johanna Schöen von Liebingen (1838–1921). From the second marriage with Johanna Horváth de Pósfa only one boy reached the adulthood: István Sándor Farkas (1918–1975).

== Bibliography ==
- Szluha Márton (2011). Vas vármegye nemes családjai. I. kötet. Heraldika kiadó
