= József Farkas (politician) =

József Farkas de Boldogfa
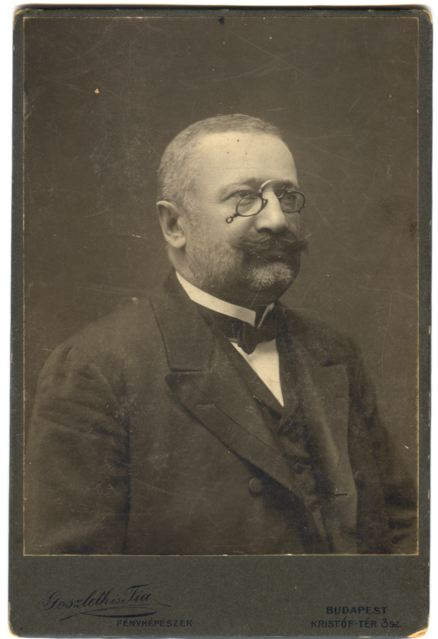

Member of the Hungarian Parliament

Personal details
- Born: 28 January 1857 Bagod, county of Zala
- Died: 17 October 1951 (aged 94) Söjtör, county of Zala
- Profession: Politician, member of the hungarian parliament (1896–1901), (1901–1905), (1905–1906), and (1906–1910).

József Farkas de Boldogfa (28 January 1857 – 17 October 1951) was a Hungarian nobleman, jurist, landowner, politician, Member of the Hungarian Parliament.

== Biography ==
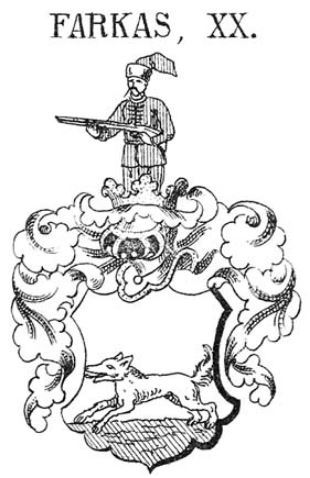
Coat of arms of the noble family Farkas de Boldogfa

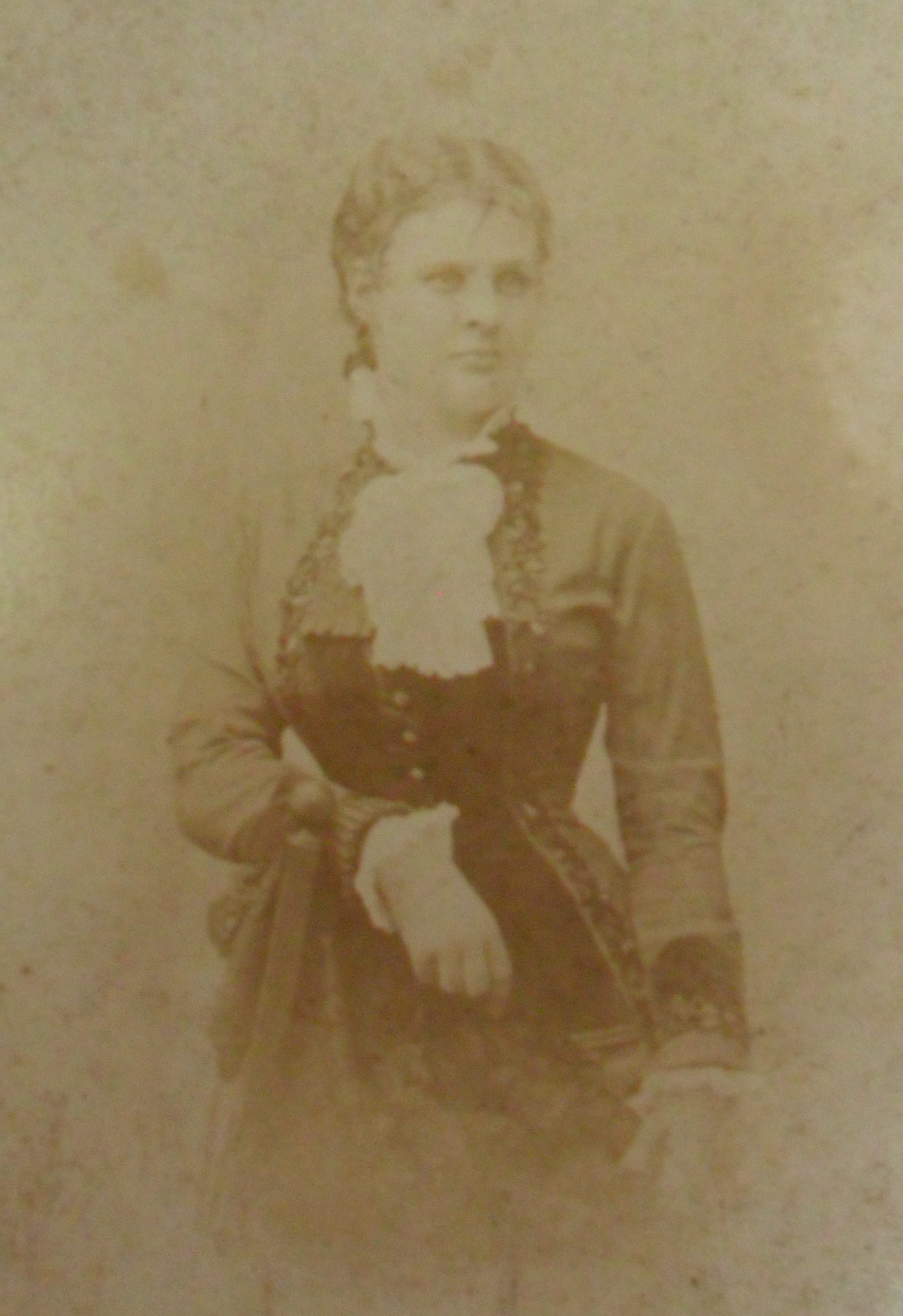
Rozália Sümeghy de Lovász et Szentmargitha (1857–1924), wife of József Farkas de Boldogfa.

Born in Bagod in the county of Zala, located in south-western region of the Kingdom of Hungary, József, was member of the ancient Roman Catholic Hungarian noble family Farkas de Boldogfa (in Hungarian: boldogfai Farkas család). He was son of Imre Farkas de Boldogfa (1811–1876), jurist, landowner, chief magistrate of the district of Zalaegerszeg (Hungarian: főszolgabíró), and Alojzia Horváth (1831–1919). His grandfather was János Nepomuk Farkas de Boldogfa (1774–1847), jurist, landowner, vice-ispán of the county of Zala (Hungarian: alispán of Zala). József Farkas de Boldogfa had two brothers: Gábor Farkas de Boldogfa (1863–1925), a landowner who never married, and Imre Farkas de Boldogfa (1860–1895), a landowner, who married Mária Viosz de Nemesvita and had one single daughter. The cousin of József Farkas de Boldogfa's father was Ferenc Farkas de Boldogfa (1838–1908), economyst, landowner, Zala county's auditor and monetary comptroller. Ferenc Farkas de Boldogfa's children, and József's second cousins were vitéz Sándor Farkas de Boldogfa (1880–1946), colonel, captain of the Order of Vitéz of the county of Zala, knight of the Order of the Iron Crown, and dr. István Farkas de Boldogfa (1875–1921), jurist, supreme chief magistrate of district of Sümeg in the county of Zala.

He attended highschool in Zalaegerszeg, Kőszeg and Sopron in Hungary. He learnt law in Budapest. He became of the representative of Zalaegerszeg in the Hungarian Parliament.

József Farkas de Boldogfa was very active in the Hungarian politics since the 1890s, working along with count Aladár Zichy, and count Nándor Zichy within the newly created Hungarian Katolikus Néppárt (Catholic People's Party). At the period of being a representative, he took over the handling of the major of the family in Zala County. He was a member of the Committee of Administration in Zala County. At the voting there was no other competitor for the position, because Imre Veszter of the Liberal Party cancelled his nomination. He was elected as representative in the Hungarian Parliament for 4 terms: 1896–1901, 1901–1905, 1905–1906, and 1906–1910.

József Farkas de Boldogfa was person of deep catholic and monarchist convictions, although he was a very tolerant and also responsible Parliament Representative: On 12 December 1901 József Farkas de Boldogfa led a delegation to Budapest to meet personally Baron Gyula Wlassics de Zalánkemén (1852–1937) Minister of Religion and Education with the purpose of asking his support for building a Synagogue on Zalaegerszeg, relying on the fact that the minister, as a Zalaegerszeg native, is well aware of the situation of the local Jews' community. A couple of years after these negotiations the Synagogue of Zalaegerszeg was finished in 1904.

On 1909, Count Pál Batthyány de Németújvár resigned to his office as the lord-lieutenant of Zala county (Hungarian: zalai főispán) and József Farkas de Boldogfa was suggested by the local nobility to be elected as the successor. Considering the delicate political situation of that time, József Farkas decided to reject the proposal.

After the World War I, King Charles IV of Hungary was not allowed to continue on the throne and the admiral Miklós Horthy de Nagybánya was elected as regent of the Kingdom. József retreated totally from the political and social life, as he felt that new regime was totally illegitimate. Considering his long service to the Administration of the County of Zala, in 1929 the prestigious membership of the County Commission was donated to him, but as a protest he openly rejected it. "I would act against my conscience to support the government system that had put the Hungarian King down in Budaörs, that acted against my crowned king and who had elected the past with such demigilant moral independence. " Then he added: "For years I had not been in touch with the current government system beyond proudly paying my taxes and I have not even dreamed of the intention to take part in any role during the current era.

== Marriage and children ==
He married on 22 February 1879 in Söjtör to Rozália Sümeghy de Lovász et Szentmargitha (1857–1924), daughter of the Hungarian nobleman Ferenc Sümeghy de Lovász et Szentmargitha (1819–1869), jurist, landowner, politician, member of the Hungarian Parliament, and Magdolna Séllyey de Séllye (1822–1901). Ferenc Sümeghy was a very good friend of Ferenc Deák. The grandparents of Magdolna Séllyey were József Sümeghy de Lovász et Szentmargitha (1757–1832), royal counsilor, alispán of Zala county, landowner and Rozália Málits (1791–1851). József Farkas de Boldogfa and Rozália Sümeghy had three sons: Kálmán, Tibor and Dénes Farkas.

His son Tibor Farkas de Boldogfa was a Hungarian legitimist politician, Member of the Parliament after the World War I. The youngest son of József, Dénes Farkas de Boldogfa also became a representative, after the finishing of World War II.

== Bibliography ==
- keptar.oszk.hu
- Halis István . Zalavármegyei évkönyv a millenniumra. 281.p.
- Sturm Albert. Országgyűlési Almanach 1897–1901. 1897-Budapest
- Zala megye archontológiája 1338–2000. Szerkesztő: Molnár András. Zalaegerszeg, 2000. Zalai Gyűjtemén. 267.p.
