= Ferenc Farkas de Boldogfa =

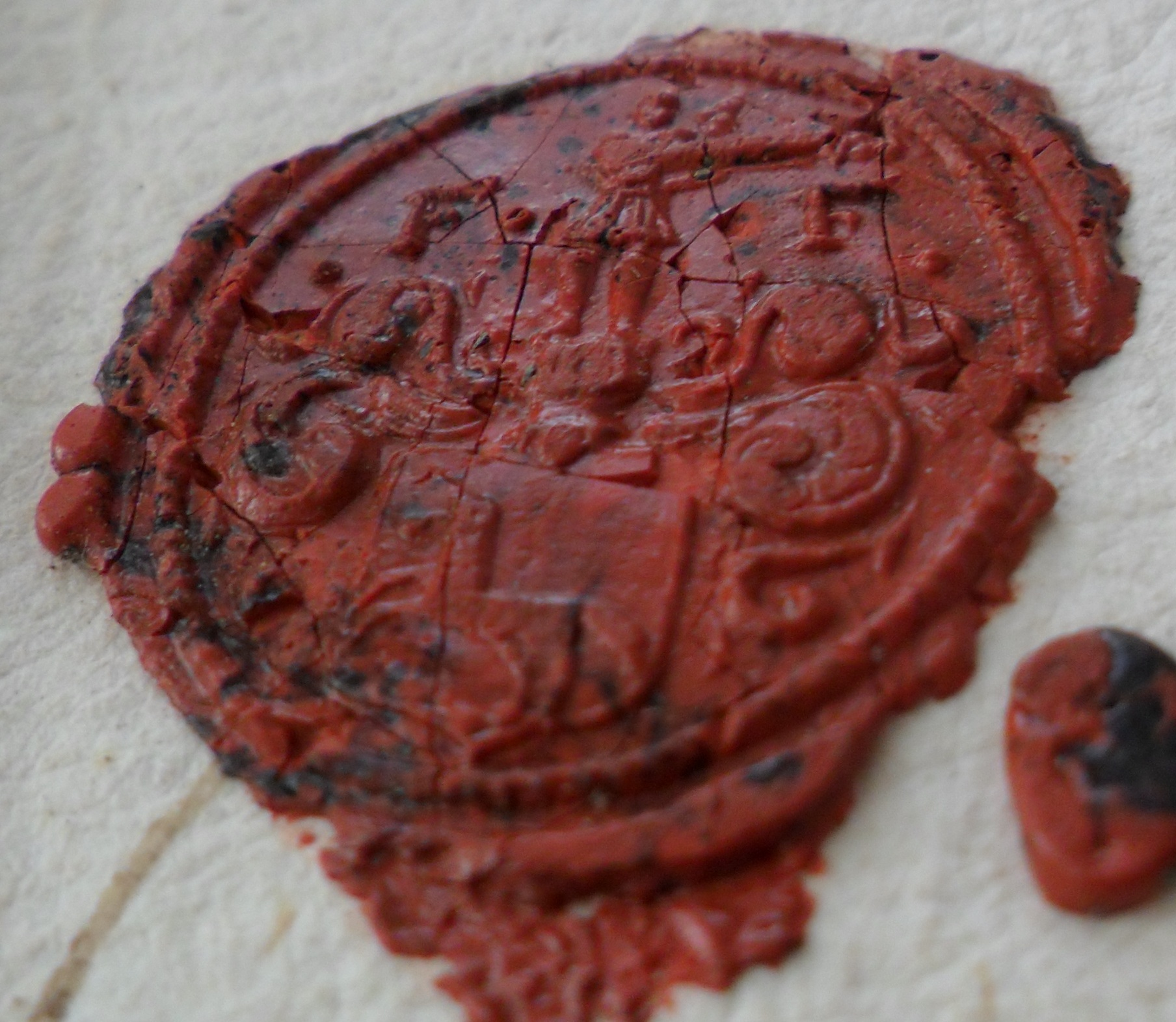

vice-ispán of the county of Zala (alispán of Zala)

Personal details
- Born: 22 September 1713 Zalaboldogfa, county of Zala
- Died: 22 February 1770 (aged 56) Zélpuszta, county of Zala
- Profession: jurist

Ferenc Farkas de Boldogfa (22 September 1713 – 22 February 1770) was a Hungarian nobleman, jurist, landowner, and vice-ispán of the county of Zala (alispán of Zala) between 1761 and 1769.

== Biography ==
Coat of arms of the Hungarian noble family Farkas de Boldogfa

Born in Zalaboldogfa in the county of Zala, in the former Kingdom of Hungary, Ferenc (in English: Francis), was a member of the ancient Roman Catholic Hungarian noble family Farkas de Boldogfa (in Hungarian: boldogfai Farkas család). His father was János Farkas de Boldogfa (†1724), jurist, landowner, chief magistrate of the district (főszolgabíró) of Zalaegerszeg, jurist, landowner; his mother was the noble lady Dorottya Sidy de Sid (1693-1775), daughter of Mihály Sidy de Sid (fl. 1672–1711), who was the vice-captain of the castle of Egervár in the county of Zala during the Turkish invasions in the decade of 1690's, and of Mária Terjék de Szenterzsébet (fl. 1692), who hailed from an ancient Hungarian family of Zala. His paternal grandparents were Mihály Farkas de Alsóeőr (fl. 1656-1664), soldier, landowner, and Éva Péter de Ságod. Ferenc Farkas descended from the Zichy, the Rudnay, and the Maholányi families from his maternal grandmother's side.

After finishing his studies of law, Ferenc Farkas de Boldogfa started working in the administration of county of Zala, as the substitute of chief magistrate of the district of Zalaegerszeg between 1738 and 1747. After the War of the Austrian Succession began, in 1741 the Hungarian nobility assisted in fight Maria Theresia of Austria: Ferenc Farkas helped in the coordination of the Hungarian noblemen's organization within the county of Zala for this occasion. Later he was elected as the supreme chief magistrate of the same district, and occupied this office between 1747 and 1756. Then he was elected as the deputy county head of Zala (vice-ispán / alispán of Zala): he was at the office from 1761 until 1769. This office was the second most important in the administration and ruling of the Hungarian county system. During Empress Maria Theresa's reign in 1765 there were sanctioned several laws for regulate the serfdom. During this time many peasant revolts occurred in the Kingdom of Hungary. Ferenc Farkas de Boldogfa was who coordinated the military defenses and successfully achieved to reestablish the local security whin the county of Zala.

As usual at his time, the catholic Ferenc Farkas donated ecclesiastical buildings. He built a private Roman Catholic family burial chapel in his lands on Zélpuszta, county of Zala, and rebuilt and expanded the church in his hometown of Zalaboldogfa.

Within the untitled nobility of the county of Zala, Ferenc Farkas de Boldogfa, was one of the wealthiest landowners during Maria Theresa's era, having through all his lands in total 70 families of serfs.

== Marriage and children ==
The coat of arms of the Hungarian noble family Rosty de Barkócz

In 1739 he married the illustrious noble lady Anna Mária Rosty de Barkócz (1722-1784), daughter of László Rosty de Barkócz (fl. 1710-1730), chief magistrate (Hungarian: főszolgabíró) of the Vas county, landowner and Mária Csapody de Zalalövő (fl. 1710-1714). Her paternal grandparents were István Rosty de Barkócz (fl. 1691–†1718), administrator of the lands (Latin: bonorum prefectus) of the counts Batthyány, landowner, and Regina Jobbágyi de Vasjobbágy (fl. 1691–1694). Her maternal grandparents were István Csapody de Zalalövő (fl. 1663–1702), captain of the fortress of Zalalövő, landowner and Zsófia Perneszy de Osztopán (fl. 1651–1702), member of the ancient Hungarian noble family Perneszy de Osztopán. Zsófia Perneszy was the daughter of II. Stephen Perneszy (†c.1651), captain of the fortress of Zalalövő, landowner, and Susanna Rauch de Nyék (fl. 1657). Among the ancestors of Anna Rosty were the noble families Both de Bajna, Pogány de Cséb, Bánffy de Alsólendva, Rauch de Nyék, Paksy de Pákos, Török de Enying and Batthyány de Németújvár.

Through this marriage Ferenc Farkas de Boldogfa acquired several lands that were inherited from the extinct family Perneszy de Osztopán. Ferenc Farkas de Boldogfa's brother in law was Ferenc Rosty de Barkócz (1718–1790), royal counselor of Queen Maria Theresa, vice-ispán of the Vas county, and a wealthy landowner. From Ferenc Farkas and Anna Rosty's marriage 13 children were born: one of them was Ferenc Farkas de Boldogfa (1742-1803), Jesuit priest, parish priest of Nemesapáti, poet, master canon of the Diocese of Veszprém. However, the son that had most relevant carrier was János Farkas de Boldogfa (1741-1788), jurist, lawyer, landowner, Prothonotary of the county of Zala, which is the ancestor of the family's two branches that exist until the present time.

== Bibliography ==
- ZML. XII. Farkas család. 7. doboz. 285. pallium.
- Szluha Márton (2012) Vas vármegye nemes családjai II kötet. Heraldika kiadó. 401. o.
