= Imre Farkas de Boldogfa =

Hungarian jurist (1811–1876)

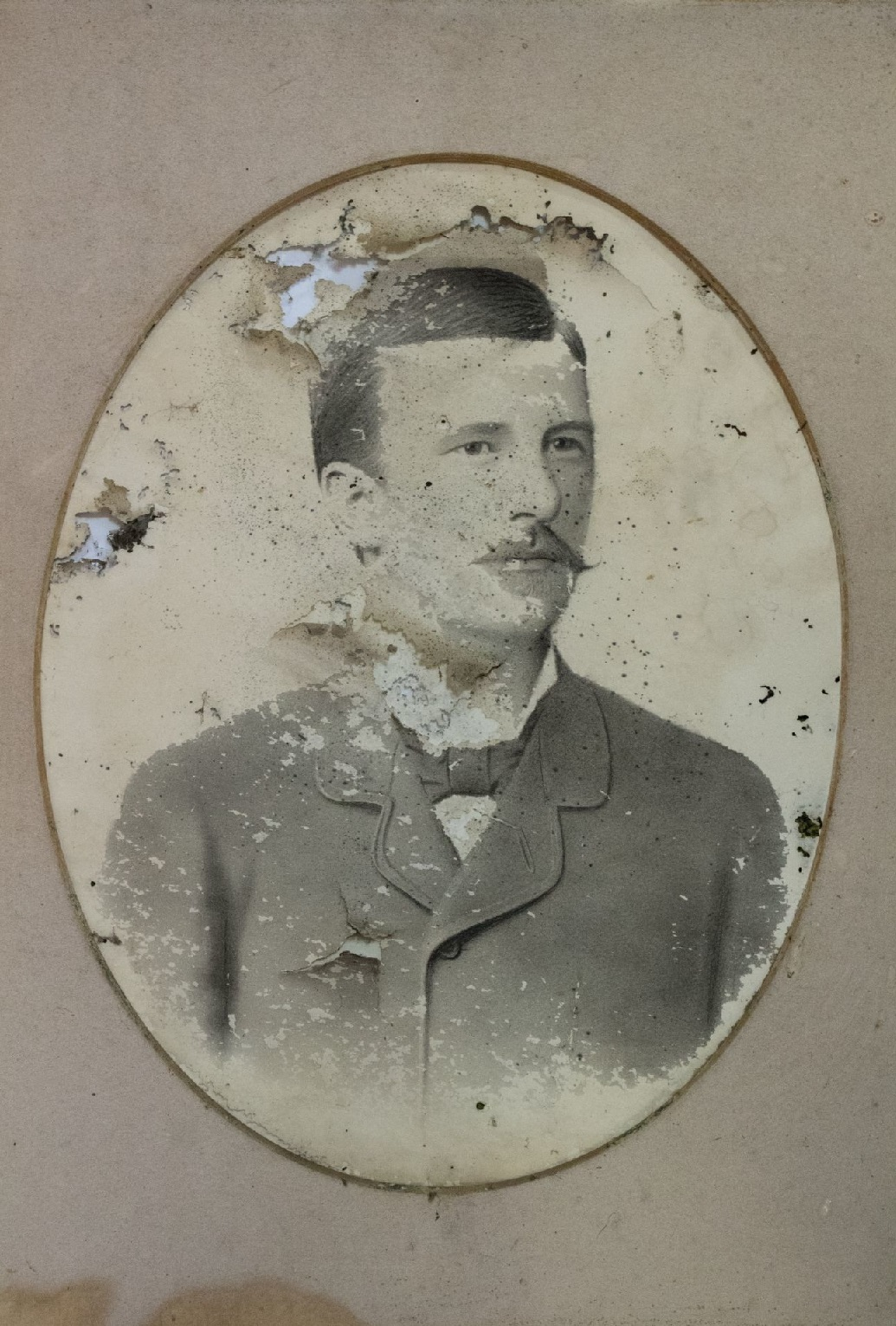

chief magistrate of the district of Zalaegerszeg (főszolgabíró)

Personal details
- Born: 16 November 1811 Zalaboldogfa, county of Zala
- Died: 25 May 1876 (aged 64) Bagod, county of Zala
- Profession: jurist

Imre Farkas de Boldogfa (16 November 1811 – 25 May 1876), jurist, landowner, chief magistrate of the district of Zalaegerszeg (főszolgabíró).

== Biography ==
Coat of arms of the family Farkas de Boldogfa

Imre (in English: Emmerich), was born in the family states of Zalaboldogfa in the county of Zala, in the former Kingdom of Hungary, as member of the ancient Roman Catholic Hungarian noble family Farkas de Boldogfa (in Hungarian: boldogfai Farkas család). He was the son of János Nepomuk Farkas de Boldogfa (1774–1847), jurist, landowner, vice-ispán of the county of Zala (alispán of Zala), and the Hungarian noble lady Angéla Skublics Besenyő et Velike (1775–1839). His paternal grandparents were János Farkas de Boldogfa (1741-1788), jurist, lawyer, landowner, Prothonotary of the county of Zala, president of the Supreme court of Zala County (Latin: "Inclyti Sedis Iudiciaria Comitatus Szaladiensis Praeses") and Judit Sümeghy de Lovász et Szentmargitha (1754-1820). His maternal grandparents were János Skublics Besenyő et Velike (1738–1808), judge, landowner, and Erzsébet Csapody de Zalalövő (1739–1781). His first cousin was Ferenc Farkas de Boldogfa (1838–1908), Zala county auditor, monetary comptroller of the county, administrative committee member of Zala county, economist, landowner.

Imre studied law and after finishing he started his work at the Zala county: between 22 September 1834 and 28 September 1840 he served as the substitute chief magistrate of the district of Zalaegerszeg (alszolgabíró). Later between 10 June 1844 and 31 October 1849 he served as the chief magistrate of the district of Zalaegerszeg (főszolgabíró). He took part of the political life of Zala county during the decade of the 1840's: in 1847 he was present in the list of the county's nobility that supported Ferenc Deák's plea of the nobility to voluntarily pay taxes (for that time one of the privileges of the nobility was the tax exemption). When the Hungarian Revolution of 1848 started he assisted organizing the Hungarian soldier armies in Zala county. As the chief magistrate of the district of Zalaegerszeg he was the responsible to contain any riots and keep security and order in the city during these times and also assisted obtaining materials for the construction of weapons for the fights. On 15 November 1848 he gathered several people and went to Letenye, as the woodbridge was destroyed by the floods. They immediately rebuilt it assisting the Hungarian troops to access the south areas of the county.

On 31 December of 1848 the Austrian armies led by the Baron Johan Buits successfully occupied the city of Zalaegerszeg, forcing Lajos Csillagh de Csáford, president of the revolutionary committee and alispán of Zala to escape to Zalaapáti. Imre Farkas de Boldogfa was commissioned to negotiate the surrendering of the independent Hungarian revolutionaries that fought the Austrian armies for almost a year. The negotiations were successful and no one was arrested or punished. Imre Farkas de Boldogfa kept his office as chief magistrate of the district of Zalaegerszeg but now under the name of Imperial and Royal Supreme Judge of Zalaegerszeg between November 1850 and 2 December 1850. After this he retired to his state of Bagod to supervise its agricultural progress, away from the politics.

== Marriage and children ==
He married Alojzia Horváth (1831-1919), who gave birth to him three sons: József Farkas de Boldogfa (1857–1951), landowner, politician, Member of the Hungarian Parliament, Imre Farkas de Boldogfa (1860–1895), landowner, and Gábor Farkas de Boldogfa (1863–1925), landowner.
