= Bertha family =

Hungarian noble family

Bertha de Felsőőr felsőőri Bertha család Bertha de Felső-Eőr
- Noble family
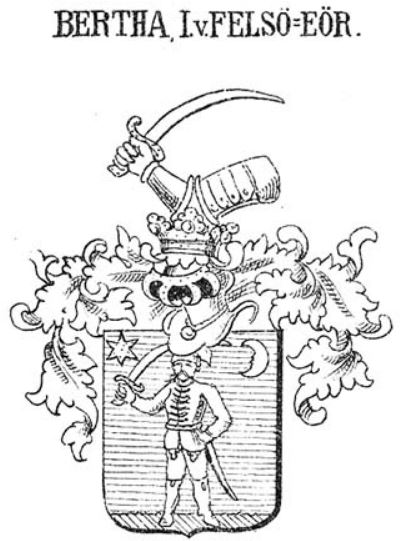
- Coat of arms of the Bertha de Felsőőr
- Country: Kingdom of Hungary
- Current region: Hungary, Austria
- Origin: Oberwart
- Founded: July 1, 1327; 699 years ago
- Connected families: kisbarnaki Farkas, lovászi és szentmargithai Sümeghy, Bezerédy, guári és felsőszelestei Guáry, dukai és szentgyörgyvölgyi Széll, chernelházi Chernel, Farkas de Boldogfa, szarvaskendi és óvári Sibrik, kehidai Deák, péchújfalusi Péchy, szendrői Gőcze, lőkösházi Tavaszy

The Bertha de Felsőőr family (or Felső-Eőr in the Middle Ages) is a still existing Hungarian noble family from Vas county, who moved to Sopron and Zala counties also. The family received noble title in exchange for his service as a border guard at Oberwart (Felsőőr). The family's nobility was confirmed on July 1, 1327, by Charles I. The first documented family name version (felső-eőri Bertha) was on January 18, 1582, by Rudolf II in Pressburg, when the family members were Márton, Mihály and Ferenc Bertha.

== Blazon ==
In a blue field, a warrior with a drawn sword, a star shining above him, and an armored arm also flashing a sword above his helmet.

— Iván Nagy, Hungarian families, Volume II, Pest, 1858

== Notable family members ==
- Ignác Bertha (1780-1847), vice-ispán of the county of Vas (alispán of Vas), landowner
  - Antal Bertha (1808-1874), Prothonotary of the county of Vas, emissary of the county of Vas, landowner
    - György Bertha (1841-1905), emissary of the county of Vas, supreme chief magistrate of the district of Pornói (főszolgabíró) in the county of Vas.
- Sándor Bertha (1796-1877), royal officer, ministerial adviser
  - Sándor Bertha (1843-1912), composer, pianist, writer
- János Bertha, principal of the Szombathely manor
- János Tádé Bertha (1757-1837), swore chief magistrate of county of Vas
- Julianna Bertha (1817-1873) - József Széll (1801-1871), ispán-regent of Vas county
  - Kálmán Széll, Prime Minister of Hungary
- Mária Emilia Bertha (1820-1890) - Ferdinánd Chernel (1815-1891), vice-ispán of Vas county
- Klára Bertha (1748-1772) - Antal Sibrik (1737-1797), vice-ispán of Győr
  - Erzsébet Sibrik (1768-1803) - Ferenc Deák (1761–1808), jurist, landowner, chief magistrate of the district (főszolgabíró) of Kapornak
    - Ferenc Deák Hungarian statesman, Minister of Justice

== Sources ==
- Márton Szluha, Vas vármegye nemes családjai, I. volume, 167–169. p., Heraldika Publisher, 2011
- Szluha Márton, Vas vármegye nemes családjai, II. volume, 25. p., Heraldika Publisher, 2012
- Iván Nagy, Magyarország családai, 34-35. p., Pest: István Friebeisz, 1858
- Márton Kovács, A felsőőri magyar népsziget, Budapest, 1942
- dr. Ede Reiszig, Vasvármegye nemes családjai
- Imre Soós, Ősi sopronmegyei nemzetségek, Sopron, 1967
