= Sándor Farkas de Boldogfa =

vitéz Sándor Farkas de Boldogfa
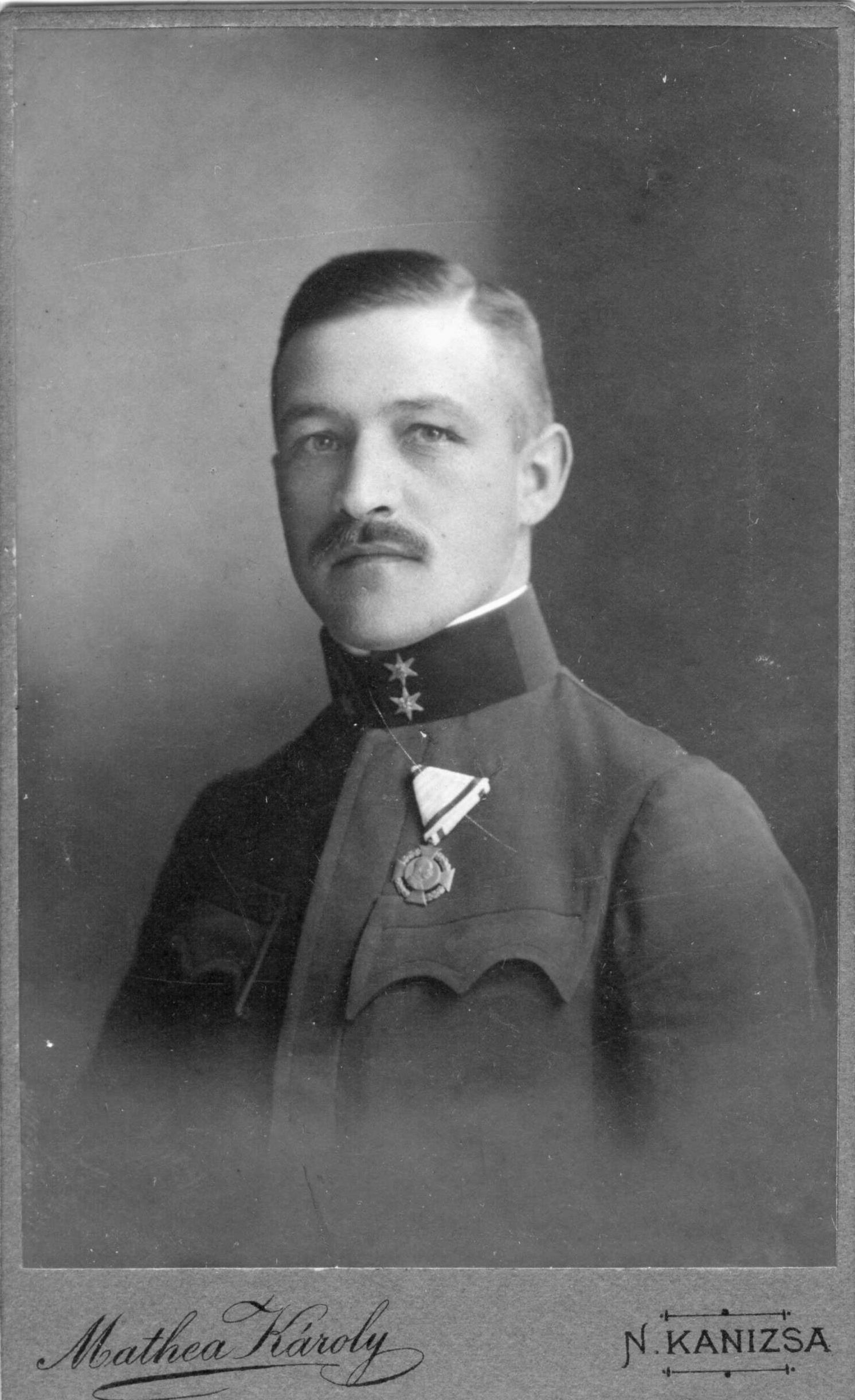

Colonel of the Kingdom of Hungary

Personal details
- Born: 16 September 1880 Andráshida, county of Zala
- Died: 11 January 1946 (aged 65) Zalaegerszeg, county of Zala
- Profession: colonel

Vitéz Sándor Farkas de Boldogfa (16 September 1880 – 11 January 1946) was a Hungarian nobleman, colonel of the Kingdom of Hungary, captain of the Order of Vitéz of the county of Zala. He was knight of the Order of the Austrian Iron Crown.

== Life ==
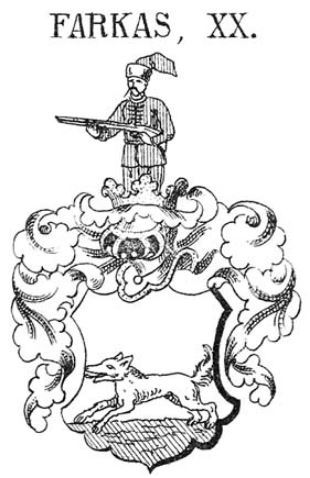
Coat of arms of the noble family Farkas de Boldogfa

Born in Andráshida, county of Zala, in the former Kingdom of Hungary, Sándor József, was a member of the ancient Roman Catholic Hungarian noble family Farkas de Boldogfa (in Hungarian: boldogfai Farkas család) that originally hailed from the land of Zalaboldogfa. He was son of Ferenc Farkas de Boldogfa (1838–1908), landowner, Zala county auditor and monetary comptroller of the county, and Zsófia Marton de Nemesnép (1842–1900). His paternal grandparents were Ferenc Farkas de Boldogfa (1779-1844), judge, landowner, and Borbála Joó (1817-1881). His maternal grandparents were the Hungarian nobleman József Marton de Nemesnép (1797-1858), deputy-noble judge (Hungarian: alszolgabíró), jurist, landowner in Zala county, and Rozália Szluha de Verbó (1816-1883). His great grandfather was János Farkas de Boldogfa (1741-1788), jurist, lawyer, landowner, Prothonotary of the county of Zala. Sándor's brother was dr. István Farkas de Boldogfa (1875–1921), jurist, supreme chief magistrate of the district of Sümeg (Hungarian: főszolgabíró) in county of Zala. Their second cousin was József Farkas de Boldogfa (1857–1951), landowner, politician, Member of the Hungarian Parliament.

He finished his highschool in Sopron and then decided to study for a military career. He finished the military school in Székesfehérvár in 1903. In 1905 he finished the equestrian course in Pécs. In 1914 he was the company commander when they fought in the Polish front at Kostkowra and showed great wisdom and behaved as a fearless officer. Between 1914 and 1919 he was the lieutenant of the 20th infantry regiment of Nagykanizsa. After World War I, he had received about 6 honors including the Signum Laudis, the Karl Troop Cross, Military Merit Cross, the Militär-Jubiläumskreuz, and was knight of the Order of the Iron Crown, and member of the Order of Vitéz.

On 22 September 1920 he married the noble lady Katalin Csomasz de Adorjánháza (1897–1964), who played also an important social role during the World War II in the local society, as she was the president of the Hungarian Red Cross of the county of Zala, and other organizations as well. She gave birth two boys to him: Lóránd and Tamás.

He officially retired in 1935 as a 55 years old Senior military officer, and then he was appointed as captain of the Order of Vitéz of the county of Zala. He occupied the office until 1939, when he resigned because of serious health problems. He was a close friend of the Count Béla Teleki de Szék (1896–1969), who was the lord-lieutenant of Zala county (Hungarian: zalai főispán).

== Bibliography ==
- Hungarian Military Archives. HM 1942 4 oszt Farkas Sándor, and IUH kit jau 1005/ 8139/ 23041 / 23041 / 29540 / 40391
