= János Farkas de Boldogfa =

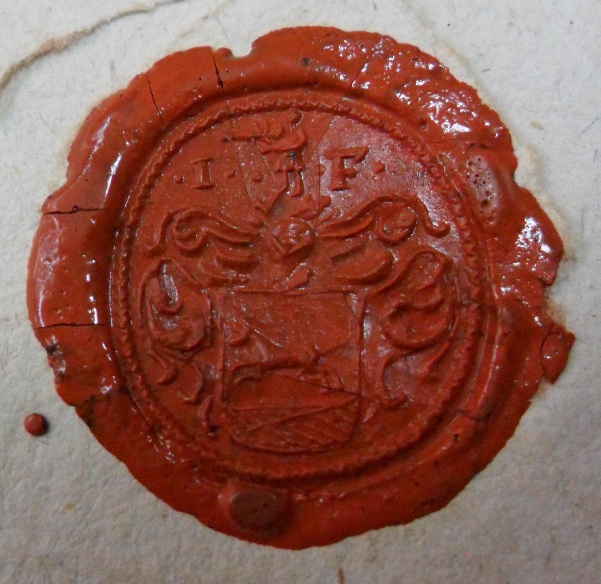

Prothonotary of the county of Zala

Personal details
- Born: 17 November 1741 Zalaboldogfa, county of Zala
- Died: 12 November 1788 (aged 46) Zalaegerszeg, county of Zala
- Profession: jurist

János Farkas de Boldogfa (17 November 1741 – 12 November 1788) was a Hungarian jurist, lawyer, landowner, Prothonotary of the county of Zala, president of the Supreme court of Zala County (Latin: "Inclyti Sedis Iudiciaria Comitatus Szaladiensis Praeses").

== Biography ==
Coat of arms of the noble family Farkas de Boldogfa

János (in English: John), was born in the family states of Zalaboldogfa in the county of Zala, in the former Kingdom of Hungary, as member of the ancient Roman Catholic Hungarian noble family Farkas de Boldogfa (in Hungarian: boldogfai Farkas család). His father was Ferenc Farkas de Boldogfa (1713–1770), jurist, landowner, vice-ispán of the county of Zala (Hungarian: alispán of Zala), and his mother was the noble lady Anna Mária Rosty de Barkócz (1722–1784). who hailed from the illustrious and ancient noble Perneszy family. His brother was Ferenc Farkas de Boldogfa (1742–1807) Jesuit priest, parish priest of Nemesapáti, poet, master canon of the Diocese of Veszprém.

After finishing his studies of law, János Farkas de Boldogfa started working in the administration of county of Zala, when he was 30 years old in 1771, as the substitute notary of the county of Zala. In 1773 he became the Prothonotary of the county of Zala, which was the third most important office in the administration of the Hungarian county system, which he occupied until 1786. In 1783 he worked as substitute of the vice-ispán of the county of Zala (Hungarian: alispán of Zala), the second most important office of the county. At the same time in 1783 he was a notary at the Royal Council of Regency (Latin:: "consilium regium locumtenentiale Hungaricum"). During the reign of Joseph II, Holy Roman Emperor from 1787 to 1788 he was the president of the Supreme court of Zala County (Latin: "Inclyti Sedis Iudiciaria Comitatus Szaladiensis Praeses").

== Marriage and children ==
In April 26th 1772 he married the noble lady Judith Sümeghy de Lovász et Szentmargitha (1754–1820), daughter of the nobleman Ferenc Sümeghy, a landowner on Zala county and Marianna Póka de Pókafalva (1728–1797). Her paternal grandparents were Mihály Sümeghy (fl. 1716−1727), Prothonotary of Zala county, landowner and lady Judit Foky (fl. 1700−1723); her maternal grandparents were Gábor Póka de Pókafalva (fl. 1728−1752) captain of the royal army, landowner and lady Klára Bertalan de Szenttamás. The brother in law of János Farkas de Boldogfa was József Sümeghy de Lovász et Szentmargita (1757–1832), royal counselor of Francis II, Holy Roman Emperor, vice-ispán of the county of Zala, and a wealthy landowner. Among the ancestors of Judit Sümeghy were the noble families Meszlény de Meszlén, Nádasdy de Nádasd, Lengyel de Lengyeltóth, and Zichy. From the marriage of János Farkas and Judit Sümeghy 7 children were born, but only two reached important social, political and administrative status: János Nepomuk Farkas de Boldogfa (1774–1847), jurist, landowner, vice-ispán of the county of Zala (Hungarian: alispán of Zala), and Ferenc Farkas de Boldogfa (1779–1844), judge, landowner. From these two sons descend the family's two branches that still exists until the present time. One of his grandsons, through his child János was Imre Farkas de Boldogfa (1811–1876), jurist, landowner, chief magistrate of the district of Zalaegerszeg (Hungarian: főszolgabíró). Other grandson was Ferenc Farkas de Boldogfa (1838–1908), economist, landowner, Zala county auditor and monetary comptroller of the county, who descended from his son Ferenc.

== Bibliography ==
- ZML. XIII. 10 Farkas család iratai. 1836 . 4. doboz. 186. pallium.
- Fónagy Zoltán. (2013). A Nemesi Birtokviszonyok az Úrbérendezés Korában. Adattár I. MTA. Budapest. 651.o.
