= Áporka =

- Village
- Seal

- Location within Hungary
- Coordinates: 47°14′N 19°01′E
- Country: Hungary
- Region: Central Hungary
- County: Pest County
- Sub region: Ráckevei

Area
  - Total: 17.47 km^{2} (6.75 sq mi)

Population (1 January 2008)
  - Total: 1,142
  - Density: 65.36/km^{2} (169.3/sq mi)
- Time zone: UTC+1 (CET)
  - Summer (DST): UTC+2 (CEST)
- Postal code: 2338
- Area code: +36 24
- KSH code: 10108
- Website: www.aporka.hu

Áporka is a village in Pest county, Hungary.

== Twin towns - twin cities ==
- Visaginas – Lithuania
