= Perneszy family =

House of Perneszy
- Country: Kingdom of Hungary
- Founded: 1206
- Founder: I. Budur

The Perneszy de Osztopán family was an important and prestigious Hungarian noble family which gave many relevant personalities. Its members were high members of the nobility of the Kingdom of Hungary since the 13th century.

== History ==
=== History of the family during the Medieval Times ===
The Perneszy family's first known member is I. Budur (Bwdwr), a nobleman who lived in 1206. His grandson, Ladislas de Osztopán, son of another (II.) Budur, had several offspring. One of his sons was I. Peter de Osztopán, who was the father of master I. Pető de Osztopán alias Perneszy de Osztpán who lived in 1354 in the Hungarian Somogy County. This I. Pető Perneszy married Katich Egudi, daughter of master John Egudi János, and increased his land possessions. I. Pető and Katich Egudi's grandson, Paul Perneszy de Osztopán, son of II. Peter Perneszy, became one of the most relevant members of the Perneszy family. Master Paul Perneszy was the landlord of the states in Kapós and in Pernesz, located in the valley Kis-Koppány: in total he possessed 22 states. Paul Perneszy became in 1444 vice-ispán of Somogy county, and was a personal assistant of the magnate Ladislaus Garai, who was the Palatine of Hungary. Between 1447 and 1460, Paul Perneszy became the vice-Palatine of Hungary, which was the third most important office in the Kingdom for that time. June 5 of 1439, he received a coat of arms donation from King Albert of Hungary. During his life, master Paul Perneszy received many new states donations in Somogy county including: Mérő, Torvaj, Szenna, Szomajom, Kalocsafalva, Kiskára and Bárd. After a time, he became the personal assistant of Nicolas Újlaki, and Paul was the vice-ban of Croatia and Slavonia in 1464, until 1470 when he died. Paul Perneszy had a wife, Ursula Zápolya (Szapolyai), member of the aristocratic Zápolya family, who was the cousin Stephen Zápolya, Palatine of the Kingdom of Hungary between 1492 and 1499. As no documentation remained that named the mother of Paul's children, it cannot be known if Ursula Zápolya was in fact just a younger second wife, or the real mother of the children.

Paul Perneszy had several sons: one of them was Sigismund Perneszy, counselor of Nicolas Újlaki, and also vice-ispán of Somogy county. His wife was Barbara Kolos de Néma, daughter of Ladislas Kolos de Néma. Sigismund Perneszy founded a branch of the family that eventually died out about a century later. The other son of Paul Perneszy was Emmerich Perneszy de Osztopán, captain of the castle of Babócsa, in 1504. His wife was Helena Török de Enying, daughter of Ambrus Török de Enying and Helena Anthymus de Thapson. Helena Török de Enying was the aunt of Baron Bálint Török de Enying (1502–1551) who was Ban of Nándorfehérvár (Belgrade), and between 1527 and 1542 the Lord of Csesznek. Emmerich Perneszy had two sons: Nicolas Perneszy, who was vice-ispán of Somogy county between 1516 and 1519, and in 1521 count-administrator of the salt mines of Máramaros. His wife was Catherine Zakmáry, who gave him only a daughter, Eufrosina Perneszy, wife of Josef Chömötey. The other son of Emmerich Perneszy and Helena Török de Enying was I. Stephen Perneszy de Osztopán, who married Magdolna Gerzsenói, daughter of George Gerzsenói, captain of the castle of Ugod.

=== History during the Turkish Wars ===
The son of I. Stephen Perneszy and Magdolna Gerzsenói was Andrew Perneszy of Osztopán (†c.1590), a wealthy landlord, captain of the castle of Felsőlendva, and vice-ispán of the counties of Tolna and Baranya and also Zala and Vas counties. He married Katalin Brodaricus de Polyana, daughter of Matthias Brodaricus de Polyana and Sara Pogány de Cséb. Her uncle was Stephanus Brodericus (1480–1539) bishop of Pécs, diplomat and the chancellor of the Kingdom of Hungary. Andrew Perneszy inherited several states in the county of Zala through his marriage, which originally were property of the ancient family Pogány de Cséb. Catherine Brodarics had a sister, Clara Brodarics, who also married a Perneszy. Clara Brodarics became wife of Wolfgang Perneszy, who was the son of Francis Perneszy and grandson of Sigismund Perneszy and Barbara Kolos de Néma. The prestigious Andrew Perneszy was the personal counselor of count Ferenc Batthyány, ispán of Zala. later he became the personal counselor of count Julius Salm von Neuburg, owner of the huge state of Felsőlendva. During this time, in 1579 the Andrew Perneszy followed the orders of the count and dismantled the clandestine printing house of the Lutheran bishop Péter Bornemisza. He had a son, John Perneszy de Osztopán, who in 1581 was captain of Nagykanizsa, and between 1596 and 1601, was the vice-ispán of the county of Zala. After that he was the ambassador of Zala county in the Kingdom's nobility assembly in several occasions. His wife was Catherine Paksy de Pákos, daughter of Jacob Paksy de Pákos and Margareth Both de Bajna, who hailed from the ancient and prestigious Hungarian noble Both family. Through his wife, and the Both de Bajna family, his children descended from the family Batthyany de Németújvár, as Margareth Both's grandmother was Agnes Batthyany, wife of Francis Both de Bajna, and daughter of Balthasar Batthyany and Helen von Greben. John Perneszy, was also captain of the castle of Zalalövő, which was a property of the family inherited from Pogány de Cséb the ancestors. Sara Pogány's grandmother was Barbara Osl de Herbotya, wife of Emmerich Pogány de Cséb, and descendant of the ancient Hungarian clan of Osl.

John Perneszy and Catherine Paksy had one son, Francis Perneszy, personal counselor of count Francisc Batthyány and later of his son Adam Batthyany. Francis Perneszy was the vice-ispán of Zala county between 1623 and 1648, and also was the ambassador of Zala county in the Kingdom's nobility assembly. He married twice: his first wife was Sofia Szombathelyi, daughter of Georg Szombathelyi, vice-ispán of Moson county, and his second wife was Ursula Bakolcha. All his children, John, II. Stephen, and Barbara, were born from his first wife. As his father, grandfather and great-grandfather, John Perneszy was also captain of the castle of Zalalövő. He married Christina Káldy de Felsőkáld, and after his death, his younger brother, II. Stephen Perneszy inherited all the states and titles property of the family. II. Stephen Perneszy (†c.1651), captain of the fortress of Zalalövő, landowner, married Susanna Rauch de Nyék (fl. 1657), daughter of the nobleman Daniel Rauch de Nyék (fl. 1613–1663), landowner and Anna Justina von Fürnberg (fl. 1657).

=== The end of the Perneszy family ===
From the marriage of II. Stephen Perneszy and Susanna Rauch one boy and three girls were born: Francis Perneszy Ferenc, who was captain of the castle of Zalalövő between 1675 and 1683. After his death, this title as captain of the castle of Zalalövő and several of his states were inherited by Stephen Csapody de Zalalövő, husband of his sister Sofia Perneszy de Osztopán. Through this marriage almost all the former states of the Perneszy family in Zala, Vas and Somogy counties were inherited by the families Rosty de Barkócz, Csapody de Zalalövő, Gyömörey de Gyömöre et Teölvár, count Jankovich de Pribér Vuchin et Dunaszekcső, Thassy de Miske et Monostor, Perczel de Bonyhád, and Farkas de Boldogfa. The other two daughters of II. Stephen Perneszy and Susanna Rauch were, Anna Julianna Perneszy, first wife of Gregory Tallián de Vizek, and then she married Francis Babócsay, captain of Veszprém, and the third one was Justina Perneszy, who married Michael Vukovich. The wealthy and ancient Perneszy de Osztopán family then died out in the beginning 18th century.

== Main alliances ==
- Apafi family
- Babócsay family
- Bakolcha de Nagyváth family
- Bethlen de Bethlen family
- Brodarics de Polyana family
- Csányi family
- Csapody de Zalalövő family
- Csömöthey de Csömöthe
- Gerzsenói de Gerzsenó
- Hásshágyi de Hásshágy family
- Káldy de Felsőkáld family
- Kolos de Néma family
- Móritz de Vadászüllés family
- Niczky de Niczk
- Paksy de Pákos family
- Rajky de Felsőrajk
- Rauch de Nyék family
- Szombathelyi de Szombathely family
- Tallián de Vizek family
- Török de Enying family
- Vigyázó de Bojár
- Vukovich family
- Zápolya family
- Zichy family

== See also ==
- Nobility and royalty of the Kingdom of Hungary
- Hungarian heraldry
- Austria-Hungary
