= Ferenc Farkas (Zala county auditor) =

Hungarian nobleman

Ferenc Farkas de Boldogfa
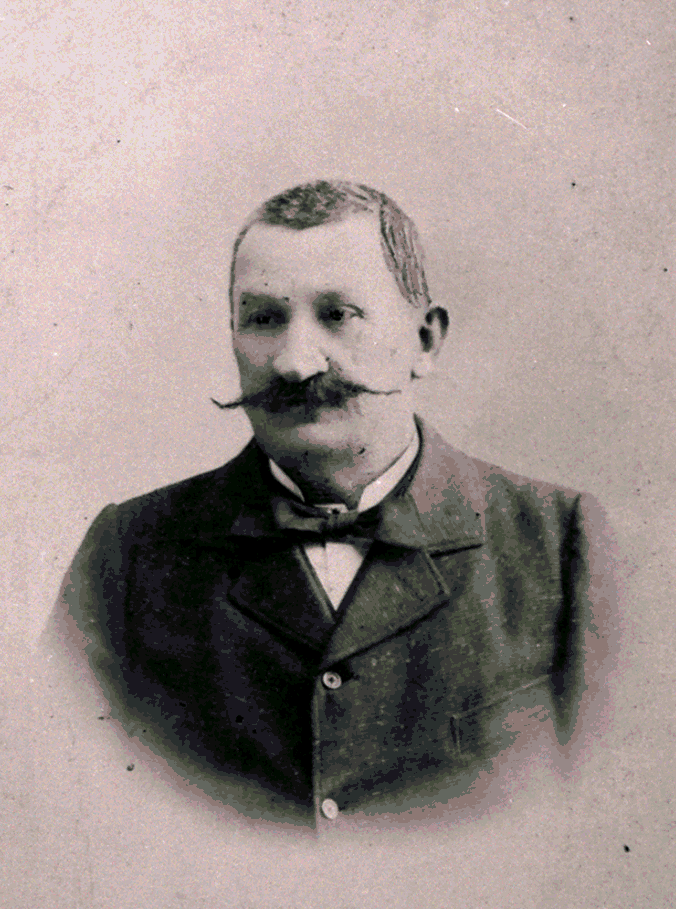

Zala county auditor, monetary comptroller of the county

Personal details
- Born: 15 September 1838 Zalaboldogfa, county of Zala
- Died: 20 January 1908 (aged 69) Zalaegerszeg, county of Zala
- Profession: Economist, landlord.

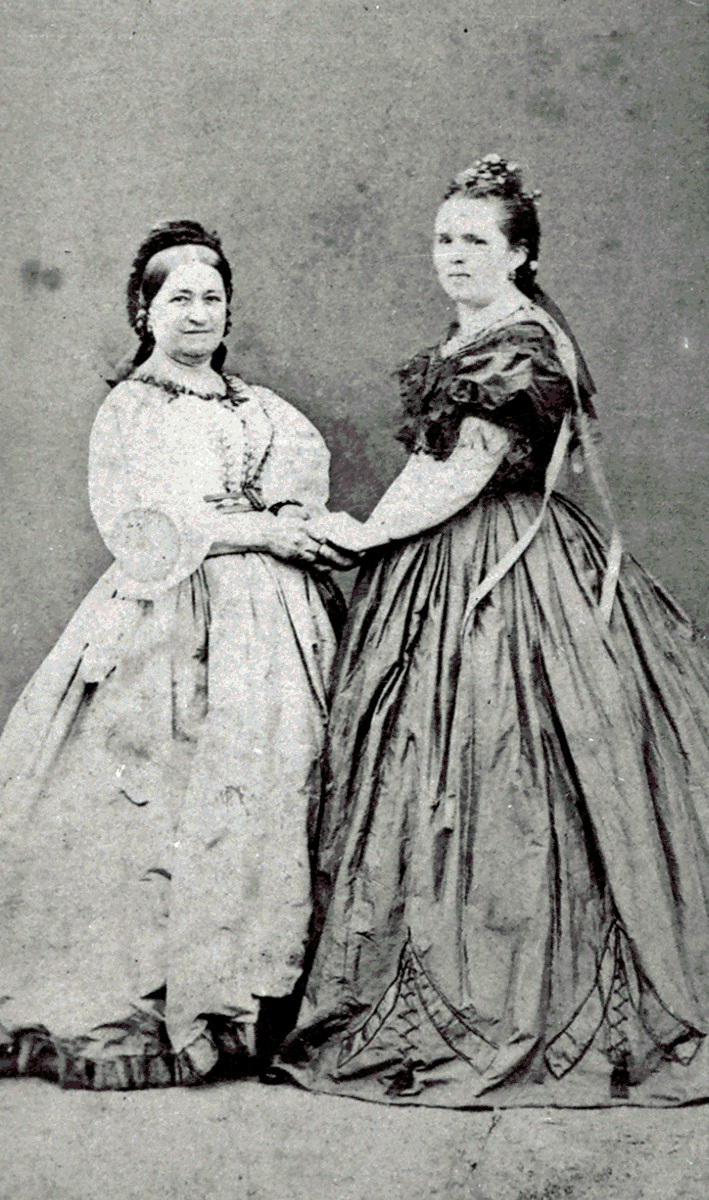
Zsófia Marton de Nemesnép (1842–1900) (right), wife of Ferenc Farkas de Boldogfa (1838–1908), and her mother Rozália Szluha de Verbó (1816-1883) (left), widow of József Marton de Nemesnép (1797-1858)

Ferenc Farkas de Boldogfa (15 September 1838 – 20 January 1908) was a Hungarian nobleman, Zala county auditor, monetary comptroller of the county, administrative committee member of Zala county, economist, landowner.

== Life ==
Ferenc (in English: Francis) was born in the family states at the town of Zalaboldogfa located in the county of Zala, in the former Kingdom of Hungary, he descended from the ancient Roman Catholic Hungarian noble family Farkas de Boldogfa (in Hungarian: boldogfai Farkas család). He was son of Ferenc Farkas de Boldogfa (1779–1844), landowner, judge, and Borbála Joó (1811–1881). His paternal grandparents were János Farkas de Boldogfa (1741-1788), jurist, lawyer, landowner, Prothonotary of the county of Zala, president of the Supreme court of Zala County (Latin: "Inclyti Sedis Iudiciaria Comitatus Szaladiensis Praeses") and Judit Sümeghy de Lovász et Szentmargitha (1754-1820). His first cousin was Imre Farkas de Boldogfa (1811–1876), jurist, landowner, chief magistrate of the district of Zalaegerszeg (Hungarian: főszolgabíró), who was the father of József Farkas de Boldogfa (1857–1951), landowner, politician, Member of the Hungarian Parliament.

Ferenc lost his father when he was only 6 years old. After finishing his studies he administrated his state in Boldogfa, where he lived with his mother. He was raised according to the thoughts and ideas of the Hungarian Revolution of 1848, as his father was a good friend of Ferenc Deák, and his godfather was Lajos Csillagh de Csáford, the vice-ispán of Zala county during the uprising of 1848. He became the keeper of the Skublics Library of the county and he was elected administrative committee member of Zala county.

Farkas Ferenc took an active role in Zala county's society. He was one of the first supporters of the fire-fighting introduction and he even assisted personally in several occasions to extinguish fire. On 2 December 1883 he was elected vice auditor of Zala county. He was one of the first members of the agricultural circle of Zala when it was founded in 1887. On 5 October 1890 he was appointed as honorary auditor of Zala county. On 29 December 1901 Ferenc Farkas de Boldogfa was elected as a juryman of the county. On 2 December 1904 he was appointed by the Kingdom's minister of finance was the monetary comptroller of Zala county. Ferenc Farkas also was a great supporter of the political Party of Independence and '48, and had great respect for Lajos Kossuth.

In January 1908 he became ill with a serious stomach disorder, although doctors reckoned he would soon recover. However, while in Zalaegerszeg on the night of 20 January 1908, his condition worsened; he suffered a stroke and died a few moments later. At his funeral Count Pál Batthyány de Németújvár (1860-1934), főispán of Zala and Lajos Árvay de Iszkáz, vice-ispán of Zala were present, together with all the most prominent dignitaries of the county next to his family.

== Marriage and children ==
On 7 February 1872 in Andráshida he married the widow of his best friend the Hungarian noble lady Zsófia Marton de Nemesnép (1842-1900), who lost her husband Lajos Viosz de Nemesvita (1836-1869). Zsófia Marton was the daughter of the Hungarian nobleman József Marton de Nemesnép (1797-1858), deputy-noble judge (Hungarian: alszolgabíró), jurist, landowner in Zala county, and Rozália Szluha de Verbó (1816-1883). Her paternal grandparents were György Marton de Nemesnép (1767-1843), deputy-noble judge (Hungarian: alszolgabíró), jurist, landowner in Zala county, and lady Rozália Patay de Petrikeresztúr (1779-1845). Among her ancestors were the noble families Csány, Eördögh de Pölöskefő, Polány de Hidvég, and Hásshágy. For example, one of her ancestors was Bernát Csányi (fl. 1549–1581), Vice-ispán of Zala county. Zsófia Marton de Nemesnép gave birth to Ferenc Farkas de Boldogfa three boys and one girl, two relevant ones were: István Farkas de Boldogfa, jurist, chief magistrate of the district of Sümeg (Hungarian: főszolgabíró), and vitéz Sándor Farkas de Boldogfa, colonel of the Kingdom of Hungary, captain of the Order of Vitéz of the county of Zala, knight of the Order of the Austrian Iron Crown.
