= Szentgyörgyvölgy =

- Location of Szentgyörgyvölgy
- Coordinates: 46.7262°N 16.4087°E
- Country: Hungary
- County: Zala

Area
  - Total: 29.58 km^{2} (11.42 sq mi)

Population (2001)
  - Total: 485
  - Density: 16.4/km^{2} (42.5/sq mi)
- Time zone: UTC+1 (CET)
  - Summer (DST): UTC+2 (CEST)
- Postal code: 8975

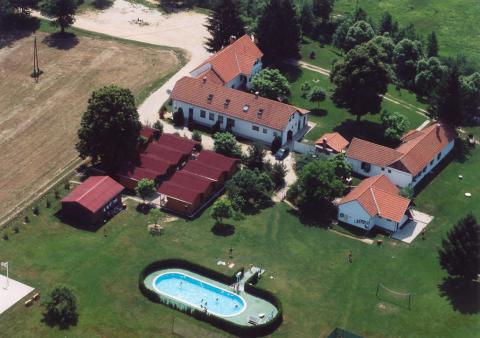
Aerial view of Szentgyörgyvölgy

Szentgyörgyvölgy is a village in Zala County, Hungary. It has a Reform Church built in 1517. It lies on the Slovenian border. It currently has a population of around 500 people. It has a Catholic church. There is one bed and breakfast, called Molnárporta after the owner. Close towns include: Csesztreg, Szílvágy, Porszombat and is one hour away from the capital of Zala county, Zalaegerszeg.
