= Farkas =

Farkas ("Wolf" in Hungarian) is a Hungarian surname and a given name. In Czech and Slovak languages it is rendered as Farkaš.

== Notable persons with the surname ==
- Alexander S. Farkas, former executive of Alexander's, an American department store founded by his father
- Andrea Farkas, Hungarian handball goalkeeper
- Andrew Farkas (writer), American writer
- Andrew Farkas (businessman), American banker and real estate investor
- Andy Farkas, American football player
- Balázs Farkas, multiple people
- Bendegúz Farkas (born 2004), Hungarian footballer
- Bertalan Farkas, the first Hungarian cosmonaut and the first Esperantist in space
- Brian Farkas, former member of North Carolina House of Representatives
- Daniel Farkas, businessman and Hungarian–Jewish immigrant in Chile
- David Farkas, American actor, lead singer of Farkas
- Dénes Farkas, Dénes Farkas de Boldogfa (1884–1973), landowner, politician, member of the Hungarian Parliament
- Edit Éva Farkas, Hungarian lichenologist and mycologist
- Evelyn Farkas, American intelligence analyst
- Ferenc Farkas de Boldogfa (1713–1770), jurist, landowner, vice-ispán of the county of Zala (alispán of Zala)
- Ferenc Farkas, Hungarian composer
- Gavril Farkas (born 1973), Hungarian-Romanian-German mathematician
- Gejza Farkaš (born 1949), Slovak football manager and footballer
- Györgyi Farkas, birth name of Györgyi Zsivoczky-Farkas, Hungarian track and field athlete
- Gyula Farkas, multiple people
- Jeromy Farkas, Canadian politician
- Julia Farkas (born 2005), Hungarian rhythmic gymnast
- József Farkas, multiple people
- Karl Farkas, Austrian actor
- Katalin Farkas (born 1970), Hungarian philosopher
- Katalin Farkas (soprano) (born 1954), Hungarian opera singer
- Kisbarnaki Ferenc Farkas, Ferenc Farkas de Kisbarnak (1892–1980), Hungarian nobleman, World War II General and Chief Scout
- Ladislaus Farkas (1904–1948), Israeli chemist, of Austro-Hungarian origin
- Leonardo Farkas, Chilean iron mining businessman and philanthropist of Hungarian origin
- Mihály Farkas (1904–1965), Hungarian Jewish Communist politician
- Örs Farkas (born 1988), Hungarian politician
- Philip Farkas, American symphony horn player
- Roko Farkaš (born 2005), Croatian multi-event athlete
- Sam Farkas (1917–2006), American bookmaker
- Sándor Farkas, Hungarian parliamentarian
- Sándor Farkas (boxer), Hungarian boxer
- Sándor Farkas de Boldogfa (1880–1946), colonel of the Kingdom of Hungary
- Shimon Farkas, cantor, singer, and performer born in Hungary, and living in Australia
- Tibor Farkas de Boldogfa (1883–1940), jurist, Hungarian nobleman, landowner, politician, member of the Hungarian Parliament, Hussar Captain
- Zoltán Farkas, multiple people

== Notable persons with the given name ==
- Farkas Bejc, Hungarian prelate in the 13th century
- Farkas Bethlen, Hungarian noble and chronicler in the Principality of Transylvania
- Farkas Bolyai (1775–1856), or Wolfgang Bolyai, Hungarian mathematician
- Farkas Gatal, Hungarian noble in the 12th century
- Farkas Molnár (1897–1945) Hungarian architect, painter, essayist, and graphic artist
- Farkas Kempelen (1734–1804), or Wolfgang von Kempelen, Hungarian author and inventor

== Fictional characters ==
- Gordon Farkas, a character in the 1990 Australian film, The Big Steal
- Farkas, one of the werewolf characters players encounter in The Elder Scrolls V: Skyrim along with his brother, Vilkas (wolf in Lithuanian)
- Scut Farkus (variation of Farkas), the bully in the 1983 film A Christmas Story
- Farkas "Bulk" Bulkmeier, comic relief in Power Rangers
- Marcus A. Farkas, recurring character in FUBAR (TV series)
