= Gyula Farkas (natural scientist) =

Hungarian mathematician and physicist (1847–1930)

Gyula Farkas de Kisbarnak
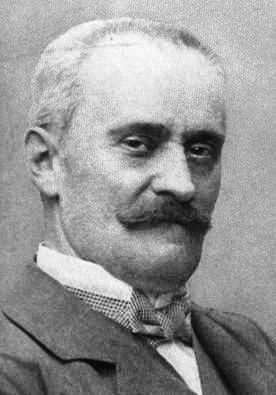
- Born: March 28, 1847; Sárosd, Kingdom of Hungary, Austrian Empire
- Died: December 26, 1930 (aged 83); Pestszentlőrinc
- Education: Royal University of Pest
- Known for: Farkas' lemma
- Scientific career
- Fields: Mathematics; Physics

Gyula Farkas de Kisbarnak (Hungarian: kisbarnaki Farkas Gyula [ˈfɒrkɒʃ ˈɟulɒ]; March 28, 1847 – December 27, 1930) was a Hungarian mathematician and physicist.

== Biography ==
Farkas was born on March 28, 1847, in Sárosd, Hungary. He was the eldest of seven children in a Roman Catholic Hungarian noble family Farkas de Kisbarnak, which can trace back their origins to the first half of the 17th century. His father was Farkas Ferenc de Kisbarnak (1820–1882), administrator of the states of Réde, property of the county Esterházys; his mother was Cecília Hoffmann (1826–1907). His paternal grandparents were János Farkas de Kisbarnak (1769–1822), state administrator of Súr (property of the Counts Zichys) and Anna Fiber. His maternal grandparents were István Hoffmann, states cashier and Rozália Vitmáier. His nephew was vitéz Ferenc Farkas de Kisbarnak Chief Scout of the Hungarian Boy Scouts, commanding officer of the Royal Ludovica Military Academy, Captain General of the Order of Vitéz. His other nephew was Gyula Farkas de Kisbarnak (1894–1958), literary historian, Finno-Ugric linguist, professor of the University of Göttingen.

His family moved around a lot, but Farkas attended the gymnasium at Győr (Raab), where he was encouraged towards physics by Ányos Jedlik. He then initially studied law and music at Pest but found that neither subject was suitable for him. Farkas worked as a private tutor before returning to the university to study physics and chemistry. While teaching in a secondary school at Székesfehérvár (Stuhlweissenburg), he read his paper at the Hungarian Academy of Science which was subjected to the critique of Loránd Eötvös. From teaching in secondary school, he then worked as a tutor for Count Géza Batthyany's children. While working for the count, Farkas had the opportunity to conduct research in mathematics and physics using a specially designed physics laboratory. Farkas alter became a principal of the normal school at Pápa. He obtained his high school teacher’s diploma in 1876. In 1880, Farkas moved to Budapest where he acquired a Ph.D. in mathematics and became a privat-docent of mathematics at the University of Budapest due to his publication record.

In 1886, Farkas was nominated for a professorship of mathematical physics at Franz Joseph University of Kolozsvár (Klausenburg). A year later he obtained it as an extraordinarius (professor without tenure) and became an ordinarius professor of physics in 1888. His scientific reputation grew both in Hungary and abroad. In 1893, Farkas represented the university at the Galilei anniversary celebration in Padova, where he received a doctor honoris causa from the University of Padova. He wrote A virtuális sebességek elve Galileinél after the Galilei celebrations. Farkas also served as dean and rector of the same university and worked there up to 1915, when he retired from his position at the university due to deteriorating eyesight. Farkas retired to Budapest but continued to work and publish until 1926.

Farkas had remarried after the death of his first wife. He lived alone after the death of his second wife in 1915. He moved in with relatives a few months before his death on December 26 or December 27, 1930, in Pestszentlőrinc.

He made a contribution to linear algebra with Farkas' lemma, which is named after him for his derivation of it. In 1894, Farkas gave a mathematical formulation to the mechanical principle of Fourier and developed a theory of linear inequalities to derive the necessary condition for the equilibrium of a mechanical system. This was an extension of Lagrange’s work on the mechanical principle of Courtivron which used equality constraints. Farkas’ work introduced inequality constraints and showed that Lagrange’s theory was a special case. If the forces in a system are conservative, finding the necessary condition for equilibrium is equivalent to minimizing the potential subject to constraints. This led to his formulation of the necessary condition of optimality of nonlinear programming in an analytical mechanical framework.

Farkas was elected a corresponding member of the Hungarian Academy of Sciences in 1898 and a full member in 1914. Farkas was highly respected for his noble personal qualities and talent in organization. He had significant contributions to applied mathematics, mechanical equilibrium, thermodynamics, and electrodynamics. His habilitation was about complex functions and quaternions. Farkas gave conditions for the solvability of Schröder's functional equation in 1884. His results in hydrodynamics and thermodynamics were discussed in the second volume of the Woldemar Voigt's ‘Mathematische Physik’, published in 1896. His physics papers were mathematically rigorous and at the same level as other contemporary papers on physics. His best-known mathematical paper was ‘Theorie der einfachen Ungleichungen’ published in 1901 where he proved his inequality theorem. Farkas was among the first to have a modern approach to entropy and derived the Carnot-Clausius principle mathematically fourteen years before Carathéodory. He was the first in Hungary to have lectures on the special theory of relativity.

== Literary works ==
His principal writings are embodied in the reports of the Academy of Science of Paris (1878–1884)

- the "Archiv der Mathematik und Physik"
- the "Journal des Mathematiques"

His separately published works are:

- "Die diatonische Dur-Scale wissenschaftlich begründet", Pest, 1870
- "Természettan elemei" (Elements of Physics), Székesfehérvár, 1872
