= Scouting and Guiding in Slovakia =

The Scout and Guide movement in Slovakia is served by

- Slovenský skauting, member of the World Association of Girl Guides and Girl Scouts and of the World Organization of the Scout Movement
- Czech and Slovak Scouts Abroad is a combined Scouts-in-Exile organization, which serves the Slovak community outside of the country
- Szlovákiái Magyar Cserkészszövetség, ethnic Hungarian Scouts in Slovakia linked to Magyar Cserkészszövetség
- Združenie Katolíckych Vodkýň a Skautov Európy na Slovensku (ZKVSES), contacts with Union Internationale des Guides et Scouts d′Europe

== Slovak Scouting in exile ==
Emblem of Czech and Slovak Scouts Abroad, which incorporates the Flag of Czechoslovakia, the Trefoil as a symbol for Girl Guides, the traditional badges of Junák and Slovenský skauting

The Czechoslovak government-in-exile officially restored Junák, and Czech and Slovak Scout groups were founded in exile, especially in the North of England and the South of Scotland. Rover Crews were founded in the Czechoslovak Armed Units in the United Kingdom and elsewhere.

In 1948, Scouting was banned again in Czechoslovakia. Czech and Slovak refugees again founded Czech and Slovak Scout groups in exile. Junák-in-Exile was formed as a National Scout Organisation-in-Exile for Czechoslovak Scouting. From 1948 to 1950 they were members of the Displaced Persons Scout Division of the Boy Scouts International Bureau.

After the end of Prague Spring in 1968 thousands of refugees left their homeland and many Scouts were among them. So the existing Junák units in many countries were enlarged and new Scout groups were founded in many countries. The Czech and Slovak Scouts-in-Exile in Switzerland founded in cooperation with the Scouts of Switzerland new Junák units. Junák was also active in countries such as Austria, Germany, Luxembourg and the Netherlands.

After the Rebirth of Scouting in Czechoslovakia, the Exile movement was disbanded and its members became members of Junák or of the N.S.O.s of their countries of residence. The Emblem shown on the left is the badge of Czech and Slovak Scouting Abroad; before 1989, this Emblem was in use with the text: Czech and Slovak Scouting Exile.

== International Scouting units in Slovakia ==
In addition, there are Girl Scouts of the USA Overseas in Bratislava, serviced by way of USAGSO headquarters in New York City.
