= Scouting and Guiding in Hungary =

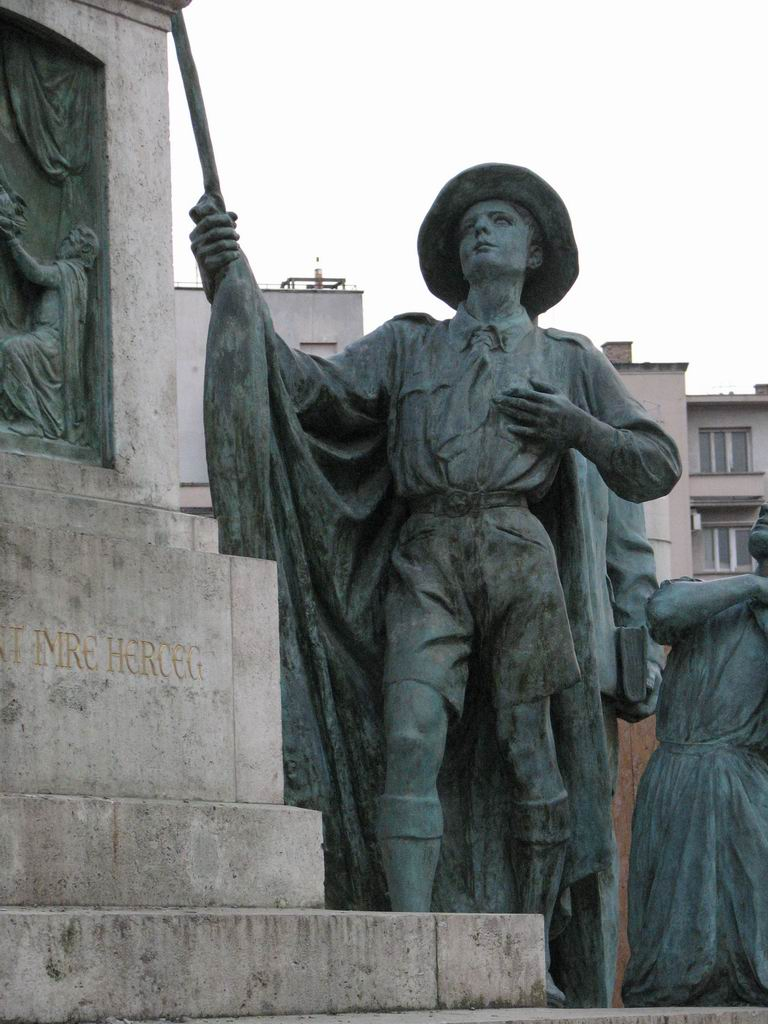
Scout statue, as a part of the Prince St. Emeric monument, Budapest

The Scout and Guide movement in Hungary is served by

- Magyar Cserkészlány Szövetség, member of the World Association of Girl Guides and Girl Scouts
- Magyar Cserkészszövetség, member of the World Organization of the Scout Movement
- Magyarországi Európai Cserkészek, candidate for membership within the Union Internationale des Guides et Scouts d'Europe
- Magyar Öregcserkész Klub, member of the International Scout and Guide Fellowship

== International Forum of Hungarian Scouting ==
The International Forum of Hungarian Scouting is a union of Hungarian Scouting organizations in Hungary as well as abroad. Its members are:

- Magyar Cserkészlány Szövetség
- Magyar Cserkészszövetség
- Külföldi Magyar Cserkészszövetség (Hungarian Scout Association in Exteris), a Scouts-in-Exile organization.
- five minority organizations in the adjacent countries:
  - Croatia: Horvátországi Magyar Cserkészszövetség (HZMCSSZ)
  - Romania: Romániai Magyar Cserkészszövetség (RMCSSZ)
  - Vojvodina (Serbia): Vajdasági Magyar Cserkészszövetség (VMCSSZ)
  - Slovakia: Szlovákiai Magyar Cserkészszövetség (SZMCSSZ)
  - Ukraine: Kárpátaljai Magyar Cserkészszövetség (KáMCSSZ)

== International Scouting units in Hungary ==
In addition, there are USA Girl Scouts Overseas in Budapest, serviced by way of USAGSO headquarters in New York City; as well as Cub Scouts and Boy Scouts linked to the Horizon District of the Transatlantic Council of the Boy Scouts of America, which supports units in west-and-central Europe, the Near East and North Africa.
