= Gyula Farkas =

Gyula Farkas, Farkas Gyula, or Julius Farkas may refer to:

- Gyula Farkas (linguist) (1894–1958), Hungarian literary historian, Finno-Ugric linguist (Finno-Ugrist)
- Gyula Farkas (natural scientist) (1847–1930), Hungarian mathematician and physicist
- Gyula Farkas (actor) (1905–1963), Hungarian actor
