= Farkaš =

Farkaš (Slovak feminine: Farkašová) is the rendering of the Hungarian surname Farkas in some Slavic languages. Notable people with the surname include:

- Aleksandar Farkaš (born 1976), Serbian politician
- Carmen Farkašová, birth name of Hana Hegerová (1931–2021), Slovak singer and actress
- Daniel Farkaš (born 1993), Serbian footballer
- Etela Farkašová (born 1943), Slovak philosopher and writer
- Gizela Farkaš (born 1942), Serbian middle-distance runner
- Henrieta Farkašová (born 1986), Slovak alpine skier
- Kristína Tormová, née Farkašová (born 1982), Slovak actress, singer, writer and artist
- Ljudevit Farkaš, birth name of Ljudevit Vukotinović (1813–1893), Croatian politician, writer and naturalist
- Michal Farkaš (born 1985), Slovak football player and coach
- Pavol Farkaš (born 1985), Slovak footballer
- Vincent Farkaš (born 1993), Slovak canoeist
