= Dénes Farkas =

Hungarian politician (1884–1973)

Dénes Farkas de Boldogfa

Member of the Hungarian Parliament

Personal details
- Born: 1 October 1884 Felsőbagod, county of Zala
- Died: 11 August 1973 (aged 88) Budapest,
- Profession: Politician, member of the hungarian parliament (1947–1949)

Dénes Farkas de Boldogfa (1 October 1884 –11 August 1973) Hungarian nobleman, landowner, politician, member of the Hungarian Parliament.

== Biography ==
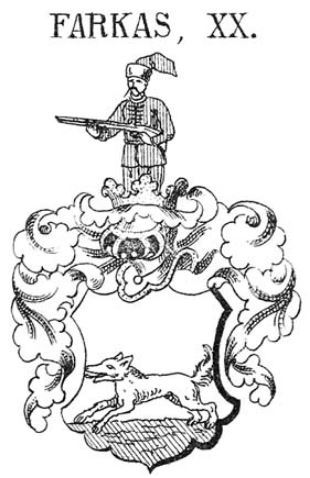
Coat of arms of the Hungarian noble family Farkas de Boldogfa

Dénes Farkas de Boldogfa was born in Felsőbagod in the county of Zala, Kingdom of Hungary, as the member of the ancient Roman Catholic Hungarian noble family Farkas de Boldogfa (in Hungarian: boldogfai Farkas család). His father was József Farkas de Boldogfa (1857–1951) landowner, politician, Member of the Hungarian Parliament, and his mother was Rozália Sümeghy de Lovász et Szentmargitha (1857–1924). His father József Farkas de Boldogfa was very active in the Hungarian politics since the 1890s, working along with count Aladár Zichy, and count Nándor Zichy within the newly created Hungarian Katolikus Néppárt (Catholic People's Party). Dénes Farkas de Boldogfa's paternal grandparents were Imre Farkas de Boldogfa (1811–1876), jurist, landowner, chief magistrate of the district of Zalaegerszeg (Hungarian: főszolgabíró), and Alojzia Horváth (1831–1919). His maternal grandparents were Ferenc Sümeghy de Lovász et Szentmargitha (1819–1869), jurist, landowner, politician, member of the Hungarian Parliament (who was a very good friend of Ferenc Deák), and Magdolna Séllyey de Séllye (1822–1901). Dénes' had two older brothers: Tibor Farkas de Boldogfa (1883–1940), landowner, politician, also member of the Hungarian Parliament, and Kálmán Farkas de Boldogfa (1880–1944), landowner, supreme chief magistrate of the district of Zalaszentgrót (Hungarian: főszolgabíró) in the county of Zala.

After high school, he graduated from the Hungarian Academy of Agriculture and soon he administrated his lands in Söjtör and leased the property of the Szombathely priesthood farm in Mezőörs. On 1912 he married the noble lady Mária Stefánia Szűcs de Szentjános (1891–1956), who gave birth a girl and a boy to Dénes. During his farming years in Söjtör he dealt with horses with great passion. In 1916, he bought Grignan, winner of the St. Stephen's Prize of 1905. After his mother's death, Dénes inherited an estate from the Sümeghy family in Söjtör.

Dénes was a politician mainly through his father József Farkas de Boldogfa, who was also a member of the Parliament in the colors of the Catholic People's Party, and was first involved in organizations with agricultural interests. Dénes joined the Independent Smallholders Party in the 1930s, where he played an active role. His writings and articles were mainly published in several newspapers.

Following the Arrow Cross coup (19 October 1944), he retired to his estate in Söjtör. After the war, in 1946 he was the executive chairman of the Smallholders' Party in Zala County, and a year later in 1947, he was co-chairman. In the meantime, until 10 August 1947, he was the responsible publisher of the Independent Zala newspaper. At the 1945 National Parliamentary election, the party started on the Zala county list but did not win a mandate. In 1947 he withdrew from the FKGP and joined the Democratic People's Party in protest of the left-wing movement, which was later included in the parliamentary election on 31 August 1947.

In the meantime, after a land reform, he owned 60 hectares of land, which he was forced to offer to the Alsófakos State Farm in 1949. After his term of office expired (1949) he completely retired from public life. Despite this, the new system deprived it of all his possessions and deployed it on the edge of Söjtör. From there he moved to Budapest with his daughter. He participated in the Hungarian Revolution of 1956l. As the oldest member of the former representatives of the Democratic People's Party, on 1 November 1956, he issued a call to Kossuth Radio to reorganize the DNP. Dénes encouraged the former DNP organizations in the countryside and the capital to organize peacefully and calmly. Prior to this, the Prime Minister, Imre Nagy, was informed by letter on 30 October (Sándor Keresztes, Vid Mihelics, Kálmán Imre Székely and his signature) about the party's transformation. After the fall of the revolution, he was prosecuted by the newly formed Revolutionary Worker-Peasant Government, where he was sentenced to two years in prison. During the retaliation, he was interned in 1957 and had to serve three months of his sentence in the Marianostrian Prison. After his release, he completely retired from politics and moved back to Budapest with his daughter.

He died on 11 August 1973, In Budapest.

== Marriage and children ==
On 27 October 1912, in Magyargencs he married the noble lady Mária Stefánia Szűcs de Szentjános (1891–1956), daughter of István Szűcs de Szentjános (1862–1925) Hussar lieutenant-colonel (in hungarian: huszár alezredes), landowner and Mária Radó de Szentmárton (1868–1945). Her paternal grandparents were István Szűcs de Szentjános (1827–1890), landowner and Vilma Szily de Nagyszigeth (1831–1920); her maternal grandparents were Ignác Radó de Szentmárton (1807–1877), landowner, supreme chief magistrate in Vas County (Hungarian: főszolgabíró) and Cecília Ajkay de Ajka (1821–1885). Dénes Farkas de Boldogfa and Mária Stefánia Szűcs de Szentjános had a girl and a boy to Dénes.
