= Miklós Hasznos =

Hungarian politician (1931–2014)

Member of the National Assembly
- In office 2 May 1990 – 17 June 1998

Personal details
- Born: 27 May 1931 Pécs, Hungary
- Died: 23 June 2014 (aged 83) Budapest, Hungary
- Party: (K)DNP (1947–1949; 1956; 1989–2004); MDF (1988–1989); Jobbik (2004–2014)
- Profession: politician

Miklós Hasznos (27 May 1931 – 23 June 2014) was a Hungarian politician, Member of Parliament (MP) between 1990 and 1998.

== Biography ==
Hasznos was born into a religious family in Pécs on 27 May 1931 as the son of lawyer Ignác Hasznos (1899–1964) and Mária Osváth (1908–1984). His father was defence attorney for Arrow Cross Party members during World War II, who, as a result, was expelled from the Hungarian Bar Association after the Soviet occupation of Hungary. Miklós Hasznos finished his elementary studies in Pécs, he also joined the Hungarian Scout Association. In 1947, he became a member of the Democratic People's Party (DNP) and involved in campaign activity of the party during the 1947 parliamentary election. In 1948, he organized several protests against the forced nationalization of his secondary school by the Communists. He also participated in the mass demonstrations against the unlawful arrest and imprisonment of Archbishop József Mindszenty. After that he was excluded from all secondary schools in the whole country, just months before graduation. He was able to take his leaving exam only in 1964 in Budapest. After 1949 he worked as an unskilled worker.

During the Hungarian Revolution of 1956, he joined the re-established Democratic People's Party. He again became involved in politics during the end of communism in Hungary, when he helped to organize the Buda branch of the Hungarian Democratic Forum (MDF). However soon, he became a founding member of his old and new party, now the Christian Democratic People's Party (KDNP). From 1989 to 1990, he served as the party's attorney general.

He was elected Member of Parliament from the KDNP's Pest County Regional List. He was a member of the Committee on Municipality, Administration, Homeland Security and Police from 1990 to 1991 and from 1993 to 1994. Between 1991 and 1993, he worked in the Committee on Social, Health and Family Protection. He also presided the Committee on Environment Protection for few months in 1994. He was a member of the Immunity, Incompatibility and Credentials Committee from 1990 to 1994. Hasznos was elected MP from his party's national list during the 1994 parliamentary election. He functioned as Vice Chairman of the Committee on Environment Protection between 1994 and 1997. When his party's parliamentary group was broken due exits and internal conflicts, he became an independent MP on 16 July 1997.

In 2000, he became a board member of the National Association of Political Prisoners (Pofosz). He joined the Jobbik in 2004. He ran as the party's candidate in the 2009 European Parliament election in Hungary, but he has not obtained a mandate. Miklós Hasznos died on 23 June 2014, aged 83.
