= Pax Ting =

I Pax Ting
- Badge
- Location: Gödöllő
- Country: Hungary
- Date: 1939
- Attendance: 5.800 Guides

Pax Ting was the first Girl Guide and Girl Scout World Camp held after the formation of the World Association of Girl Guides and Girl Scouts. It was held in Gödöllő, Hungary from July 25 to August 7, 1939, and attended by some 5,800 Girl Guides from around the world.

At the 10th World Conference of Girl Guides which was held in Adelboden, Switzerland, it was decided to hold a world meeting for Girl Guides in 1939, following the example of the World Scout Jamborees. The site was chosen as Gödöllő in Hungary, where in 1933, the 4th World Scout Jamboree had been held. It was suggested calling the camp "Jamborina", but consultations had to be held with the World Organization of the Scout Movement about using this as the official name. Later, on the advice of Olave Baden-Powell the name Pax Ting (meeting of peace) was chosen. It was decided that 120 Girl Guides and 12 leaders from every country could take part. The minimum age for participation was 14 years, and the Girl Guides had to have achieved second class and a camping badge. The leaders had to have a camping diploma. In the year preceding the camp, Hungarian Girl Guides had learned foreign languages so as to enable them act as guides and interpreters. Archduchess Anna of Hungary, Prince Gustaf Adolf and Princess Sybilla of Sweden were also present at Pax Ting. Due to the threat of World War II, which broke out a month later, there were only 5,800 girls from 32 countries present.

A set of four postage stamps was issued to celebrate Pax Ting. The 2f stamp has a hand raised in salute with an olive branch in background. The 6f stamp features the Hungarian Girl Guide insignia, composed of the Shield of Hungary, the Crown of St. Stephen and Lily. The 10f stamp shows the heads of two women and features a dove with olive branch in front of a banner.
