= Külföldi Magyar Cserkészszövetség =

Hungarian scouts-in-exile organization

- Hungarian Scout Association in Exteris
- Country: 11 countries worldwide
- Founded: 1945
- Membership: 4,500
- Affiliation: International Forum of Hungarian Scouting
- Website kmcssz.org

Külföldi Magyar Cserkészszövetség (Hungarian Scout Association in Exteris) is a Scouts-in-Exile organization created for youth of Hungarian descent. Scouting makes it possible for young men and women to learn more about their Hungarian heritage, language and culture. The organization is dedicated to carrying out its obligations at four levels: God, their adopted countries, their fellow man and the Hungarian nation. The Boy Scout and Girl Scout units meet in conjunction with Hungarian weekend schools, which in many instances they also operate.

== History ==
At the end of World War II in 1945 and during subsequent years, Scout groups were organized by Hungarian refugees in Austria and Germany. As a young Scoutmaster during 1945, Gábor Bodnár (b. 1920) worked with several Scout friends to organize troops in refugee camps in Germany. They were referred to collectively as the Hontalan Sasok or "Homeless Eagles". Bodnár led the Külföldi Magyar Cserkészszövetség from its founding in 1945 until his death in the early 1990s.

These groups from the Displaced Persons camps joined together to form the Pál Teleki Scout Association. After the start of the Cold War and the rise of the Iron Curtain, which closed the borders of Hungary in 1948, the Communist government officially disbanded Scouting within Hungary's borders. To help preserve the traditions of Hungarian Scouting, the Pál Teleki Scout Association changed its name to that of the now-banned national Hungarian Boy Scout association, Magyar Cserkészszövetség.

In the late 1940s and early 1950s, the refugees from World War II and the new Communist regimes in Eastern Europe were unable to return to their native country. Many emigrated to various countries. The first overseas troop was founded in 1950 in Rio de Janeiro, although it has since disbanded. Three troops founded in Caracas, Venezuela, were still active in 2009. Along with Brazil and Venezuela, troops were founded in the United States, Canada, Australia, and other countries. The organization grew from about 1,000 members in the early 1950s to over 6,000 members in the late 1970s.

The Hungarian Scouts-in-Exile were members of the Displaced Persons Scout Division of the Boy Scouts International Bureau, Council of Scout Associations in Exile and founding members of the Associated International Scout and Guide Organizations in 1976.

The Magyar Cserkészszövetség-in Exile helped to restart Scouting in Hungary. Among them was Dr. Béla H. Bánáthy, a long-standing member of the Hungarian Scout Association Abroad. Bánáthy had attended the 4th World Scout Jamboree held at Gödöllő in 1933. He later became personal friends with General Kisbarnaki Ferenc Farkas. General Farkas became Chief Scout of Hungary after Prime Minister Pál Teleki committed suicide on the eve of Hungary's forced entry into World War II. Bánáthy was also Director of Leadership Development of the Magyar Cserkészszövetség for young men 18–24 years old at the Royal Ludovika Akademia during World War II. In 1992 Bánáthy traveled from the United States to Hungary following its renewed freedom to help restart the Hungarian Scout Association.

With the introduction of democracy to Hungary in 1989, Külföldi Magyar Cserkészszövetség returned the Association's original seal to Hungary and to the newly reorganized Hungarian Scout Association. The organization maintains close relationships with the reconstituted Magyar Cserkészszövetség in Hungary, and with independent Hungarian Scout Associations organized in areas of significant Hungarian minority populations in neighboring Slovakia, Croatia, Subcarpathian Ukraine, Romania, and Serbia. These areas had been part of Hungary prior to World War I and the Treaty of Trianon, which carved Hungary up into a much smaller nation. Since the advent of democracy in these countries, Külföldi Magyar Cserkészszövetség has trained almost 500 Scoutmasters and assistant Scoutmasters for these brother associations. The World Organization of the Scout Movement maintains ties and provides support to the reemerging Scouting movements in the countries of their birth.

In 1995 Külföldi Magyar Cserkészszövetség held several 50th-anniversary celebrations, sponsoring Jamborees in Fillmore, New York, Germany, and near Melbourne, Australia. The South American troops held a Jamboree late in 1996.

== Structure ==
In 1997, the Külföldi Magyar Cserkészszövetség had about 4,500 Scouts in 70 troops spread among five active districts worldwide: I) Europe, including Austria, Switzerland, Germany, Sweden, and Great Britain; II) South America, specifically Brazil and Argentina; III) The United States and Venezuela; IV) Australia; and V) Canada.

District III contained the largest number of Scouts in four councils: The New York Council has two troops in New York City; two troops in Garfield, New Jersey; two troops in New Brunswick, New Jersey; two troops in Philadelphia (no longer active); one troop in Boston; one troop in Wallingford, Connecticut; and one troop in Washington, D.C. The Cleveland Council has seven troops, four in Cleveland, and one each in Chicago, Buffalo, and Pittsburgh. The California Council has two troops in San Francisco and four troops in Los Angeles. Lastly, the Venezuelan council has three troops in Caracas.

In cities around the world that contain substantial Hungarian populations, a Boy Scout and Girl Guide troop is either closely affiliated with or actually operates the Hungarian weekend schools. The organization has donated more than U.S. $350,000 to support adult leader training in the United States, Austria, Hungary and Slovakia.

== See also ==
- Scouting in displaced persons camps
