= Gragger (surname) =

Gragger is a surname. Notable people with the surname include:

- Anton Fritz Gragger (born c. 1920s), Austrian chess player
- Matthias Gragger (born 2001), Austrian footballer
- Róbert Gragger (1887–1926), literary historian and philologist of Hungarian descent

== See also ==
- Grager, a Purim noisemaking device
