= Order of Vitéz =

Hungarian order of merit

- Badge of the Order

Awarded by Regent Miklós Horthy
- Type: State Order (formerly); House Order (currently)
- Established: 20 August 1920 – 23 February 1945 (National Order)
- Awarded for: Civil and Military Merit
- Captain General: József Károly von Habsburg (ICOC)

Statistics
- First induction: 1920
- Last induction: 1944 (officially)

The Order of Vitéz (Hungarian: Vitézi Rend; frequently spelled in English as 'Vitez') is a Hungarian order of merit which was founded in 1920. It was awarded as a state honor from 1920 to 1944.

During World War II, many members of the Hungarian government and military were members of the Order; as such, members were involved in both contributing to the Holocaust as well as leading efforts against it. The United States Department of State lists the Order of Vitéz as having been "under the direction of the Nazi Government of Germany", like the French Police under Vichy France.

The Order of Vitéz has several successors; one, the Order of Vitéz under Captain General vitéz József Károly von Habsburg, is recognised by the International Commission on Orders of Chivalry as an "Institution of Chivalric Character"; and so has become, de facto, comparable to a house order of the Palatinal branch of the House of Habsburg (Palatine of Hungary).

== Name ==
The Hungarian word Vitéz is of medieval Slavic origin and means "valiant", "gallant soldier" or "knight".

The Vitézi Rend (Order of the Valiant) should not be confused with the 17th-century Vitézlő Rend (Fighting Estate), which refers to a rebellion of former peasants and craftsmen whose homes had been destroyed by the Ottoman Empire. These men took up arms and formed an estate within society that received charters, rights and privileges over the centuries, mainly from the princes of Transylvania, but which were eventually recognised by the Habsburg kings of the Kingdom of Hungary.

== Establishment of the Order ==
Following the peace Treaty of Trianon, which banished the ruling House of Habsburg from Hungary, a constitutional assembly decided to return to the monarchical form of government and replace the incumbent Habsburg regent, Archduke Joseph August of Austria, with Vice-Admiral Miklós Horthy de Nagybánya. It was mainly his idea to help re-build the shattered country by giving land to soldiers who had proven themselves on the battlefield. This way, the poverty brought on by World War I could begin to be alleviated and soldiers could be rewarded.

The Vitéz Order was created by Prime Ministerial Decree number 6650 of 1920 (6650/1920 M.E. in Hungarian usage) and was included as paragraph no. 77 in the Land Reform Act (Law XXXVI of 1920). Membership replaced the titles of nobility; since Horthy was only the regent of the Hungarian Kingdom, he had no rights to make people knights or noblemen.

The title of "Vitéz" was to serve as an award. The "Vitéz" title was official. The legislation gave those qualifying as members of the Order in need a grant of land and/or a house. According to Viktor Karady, "its members served as a strictly Christian gentry".

Admittance into the Order was exclusively on military merit by the number of medals won. It worked on a system depending on rank, where privates or junior NCOs had to prove lesser awards of bravery, while officers and generals had to prove more in World War I.

Members received a badge and were entitled to use the designation Vitéz as a prefix to their names. Admission into the Order also carried with it a land grant of 40 cadastral holds to an officer, eight cadastral holds to other ranks based on need (1 cadastral hold = c. 1.43 acres). The Order of Vitéz became hereditary, and the grants (title, badge and land grant) were to be passed on by the recipient to his eldest son. Horthy was the first to be admitted into the Order and was also its Captain General (Főkapitány). In 1920, Archduke Joseph August of Austria became the first knight of the Order of Vitéz.

== World War II ==
In October 1944, the Government of National Unity was established as a Nazi puppet state. According to the Hungarian historian George Deák, the Order of Vitéz was a "'tainted' but ambiguous symbol" during the war years: antisemitism was a shared sentiment among the order membership, though the Order itself was not explicitly antisemitic. For example, Hungarian Interior Minister László Endre, a noted anti-semite, member of various incarnations of the Hungarian National Socialist Party, and Nazi collaborator during the war, eagerly helped Adolf Eichmann collect and deport more than 400,000 Hungarian Jews between May and July 1944, and was a "proud members of the order" according to Deák. László Ferenczy, a Lieutenant colonel in the Hungarian Gendarme who worked under Endre to first establish the ghettos and later the deportation of the Jews of Hungary in 1944, gathered thousands of Jews at the Obuda brick factory and sent them on a death march towards Hegyeshalom near the Western border to build a line of defense, and indicated in reports that he was aware of what was taking place at Auschwitz. Like Endre, Ferenczy was a "proud member of the order" according to Deák. The majority of the real estate owned by Jews that were deported after the German occupation of Hungary went to organizations supportive of the collaborationist regime, including the Order of Vitéz and some of its members.

However, Hungarian historian Róbert Kerepeszki stresses that there were ruptures in the organization of the Order of Vitéz on the question of Nazism during the war, and many of them died fighting against Arrow Cross Party. The most famous of them was Vilmos Nagy de Nagybaczon, who was awarded the title of Righteous among the Nations for saving Jews. Vitéz Colonel Ferenc Koszorus deployed his troops to stop Jewish deportations, allowing the escape of perhaps as many as 250,000 Jews concentrated in Budapest. Miklós Horthy Jr. was also an anti-fascist "Vitéz" who conducted negotiations with the Allies, and was deported to a concentration camp. Colonel-General Vitéz Gábor Faragho and Colonel-General Vitéz Béla Miklós of Dálnok joined the Soviet forces after the failed attempt of Horthy to make an armistice with the Allies. Lieutenant colonel Vitéz Oszkár Variházy fought against the Nazis during the Siege of Budapest. Lieutenant-General Vitéz Szilárd Bakay was deported to a Nazi concentration camp for his activity during Horthy's armistice attempt on 16 October. Vitéz Lajos Keresztes-Fischer and his brother Vitéz Ferenc Keresztes-Fischer were also deported to concentration camps by the Szálasi-regime, due to their Anglo-Saxon orientation and anti-fascist stance.

After the Nazi coup d'état, the second highest-ranking officer of the Order of Vitéz next to Miklós Horthy, Vitéz Igmándy-Hegyessy Géza suspended the activity of the Order of Vitéz, to demonstrate that the Order would not cooperate with the Arrow Cross Party – he was also deported to a concentration camp.

In fact "a small number of wealthy Jews allied themselves with the Order as well" – though without being members of the Order themselves, as Jews had been officially excluded from being able to join the Order by the 1938 racial laws.

Under the Armistice signed between the Allies and the Provisional National Government of Hungary (hu:Ideiglenes Nemzeti Kormány), which was set up in the liberated part of Hungary from the fall of the Nazis until 1945, the Government undertook "to dissolve immediately all pro-Hitler or other fascist political, military, para-military and other organizations on Hungarian territory conducting propaganda hostile to the United Nations and not to tolerate the existence of such organizations in future." The Order's governing National Council of Vitéz was listed as such an organization by Prime Ministerial Edict no. 1945/529.

Paragraph 1, §(1) of the Statute IV of 1947 regarding the abolition of certain titles and ranks declares annulment of the Hungarian aristocratic and noble ranks, and paragraph 3 §(1) specifically forbids the use of the "Vitéz" title.

The United States Department of State included this Order of Vitéz as an institution "under the direction of the Nazi Government of Germany," along with the ruling Arrow Cross Party and other contemporaneous organizations, such as the French Police under Vichy France.

== The continuity of Vitézi Rend in the postwar era ==
After World War II, veterans' groups, including members of the Vitéz Order appointed by Horthy, began working to re-establish the Order in exile. The Order remained united until the 90s, with the first secession occurring after the End of communism in Hungary and the end of exile. The reasons behind the multiple secessions after the first one, which happened in 1997 under the guidance of Archduke Joseph Árpád of Austria, are (According to the group called "Kárpát-medencei Vitézi Rend") mainly the following: the practice of granting the title to foreigners, the decision to make the office of captain general hereditary and distance from the demands of the Hungarian members of the Order. The Order recognized by the ICOC since 1964 had Joseph Árpád as its head since 1977 to 2017, while the Vitézi Rend under gróf Molnár-Gázso János claims that the archduke was Captain General until 1993 and "Grand master" until 1997, year of the seccession of the two groups. Today, after multiple divisions, there are several groups that claim the title of Vitéz, and the usage of the original badge (''Vitézi Rend'', ''Történelmi Vitézi Rend'', ''Kárpát-medencei Vitézi Rend'', 1956-os ''Vitézi Lovagrend Világszövetsége'', etc.). All of these are legally private associations, as most of the Orders of chivalry of former royal families.

The most notable of these groups is the Vitézi Rend (Order of Vitéz). This was reestablished in 1953, by General vitéz Hugó Sónyi as an order of chivalry according to traditional statutes. In 1977, the Archduke József Árpád (grandson of Archduke József Ágost), became Captain General of the Order until his death in 2017. With his election the Order decided to transmit the dignity of the leadership to his oldest son and that the Captain General must be a member of the Hungarian branch of the House of Habsburg, so the succession of the most important role in the Order was codified and the Order was linked to the Habsburgs. Today the Captain General is Archduke Josef Karl of Habsburg-Lorraine. In this way the Order has become, de facto, comparable to a house order of the Palatinal branch of the House of Habsburg (De jure it remains a semi-independent order). Since 1983, this Vitéz Order has been awarded to individuals who have defended Hungarian national interests and culture. The Captains General of this order have been:

Captains General of the Order since 1920
1	Vitéz (like most of the orders of chivalry of the former royal families), as the public status has been Lost since 1944.Miklós Horthy de Nagybánya (1868–1957)	1920	1956	Vice Admiral; Regent of Hungary (1920–1944)
2	Vitéz Hugó Sónyi (1883–1958)	1956	1958	Commander-in-Chief of the Hungarian Army (1936 -1940)
3	Vitéz Archduke Joseph August (1872–1962)	1959	1962	Homo regius (1918, 1919); President of the Academy of Sciences (1936–1944)
4	Vitéz Ferenc Farkas de Kisbarnak (1892–1980)	1962	1977	Chief Scout of Hungary (1941–1945)
5	Vitéz Joseph Árpád (1933–2017)	1977	2017	Grandson of Joseph August
6	Vitéz Joseph Károly von Habsburg (1960– )	2017		Son of Joseph Árpád

== Notable Members of the Order ==
The Order led by the Hungarian branch of the Habsburgs, recognised by the I.C.O.C., still has some prestige among the nobility, showing as most notable members:

- Leka, Prince of Albania, Crown Prince of Albania.
- Ermias Sahle Selassie, Ethiopian Prince head of the Crown Council of Ethiopia.
- Duarte Pio, Duke of Braganza, Pretender to the Throne of Portugal.
- Emmanuel Bushayija, Titular King of Rwanda.
- Joseph Károly von Habsburg, Head of the Palatine-Branch of the house of Habsburg.
