= Tibor Farkas =

Hungarian politician (1883–1940)

dr. Tibor Farkas de Boldogfa
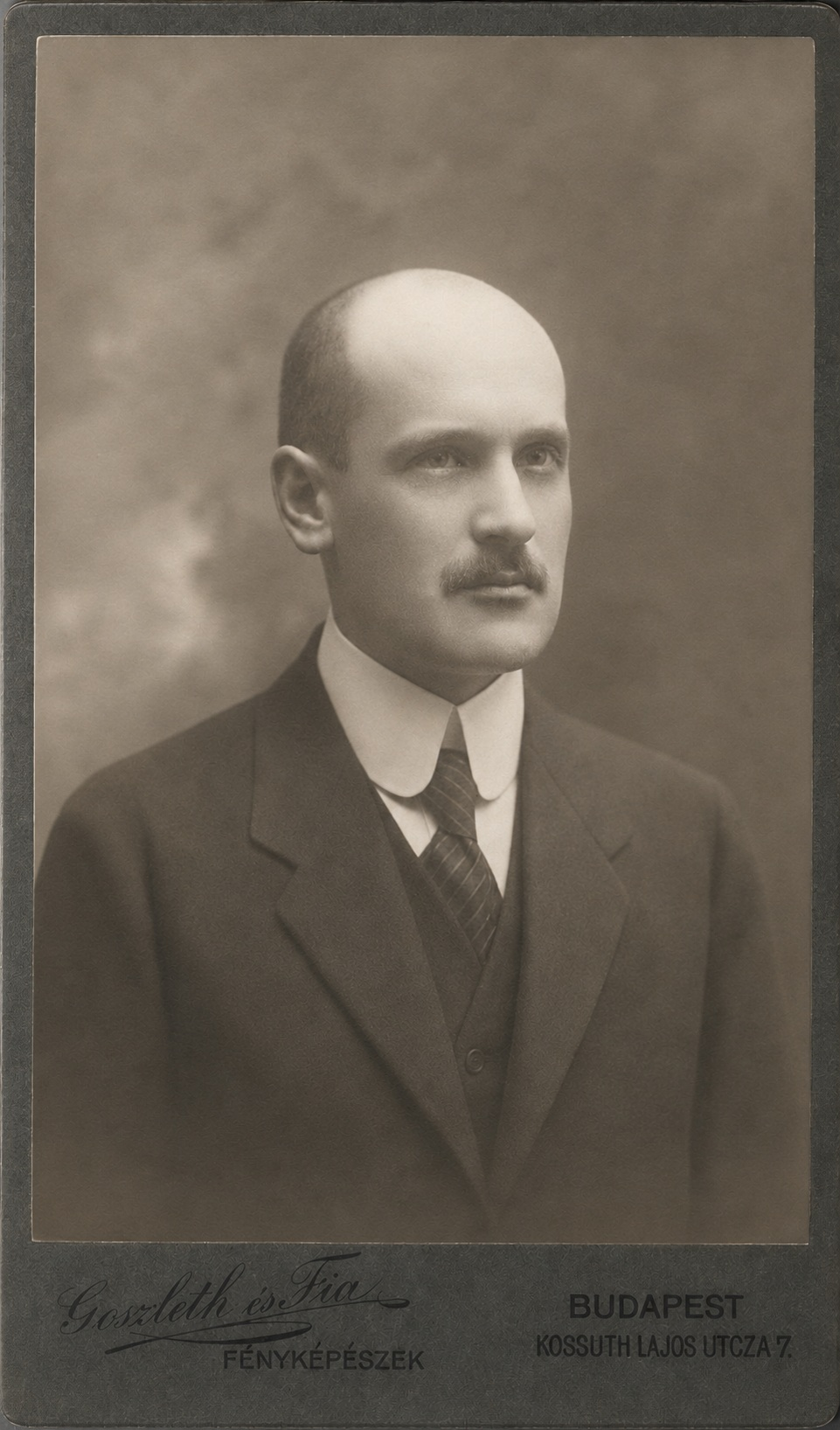

Member of the Hungarian Parliament

Personal details
- Born: 14 April 1883 Felsőbagod, county of Zala
- Died: 26 March 1940 (aged 56) Zalaegerszeg, county of Zala
- Profession: politician, jurist, member of the hungarian parliament (1922–1926) and (1931–1935)

Dr. Tibor Farkas de Boldogfa (14 April 1883 – 26 March 1940) jurist, Hungarian nobleman, landowner, politician, member of the Hungarian Parliament, Hussar Captain. He was a respected Hungarian legitimist politician during the two World Wars period.

== Life ==
Coat of arms of the Hungarian noble family Farkas de Boldogfa

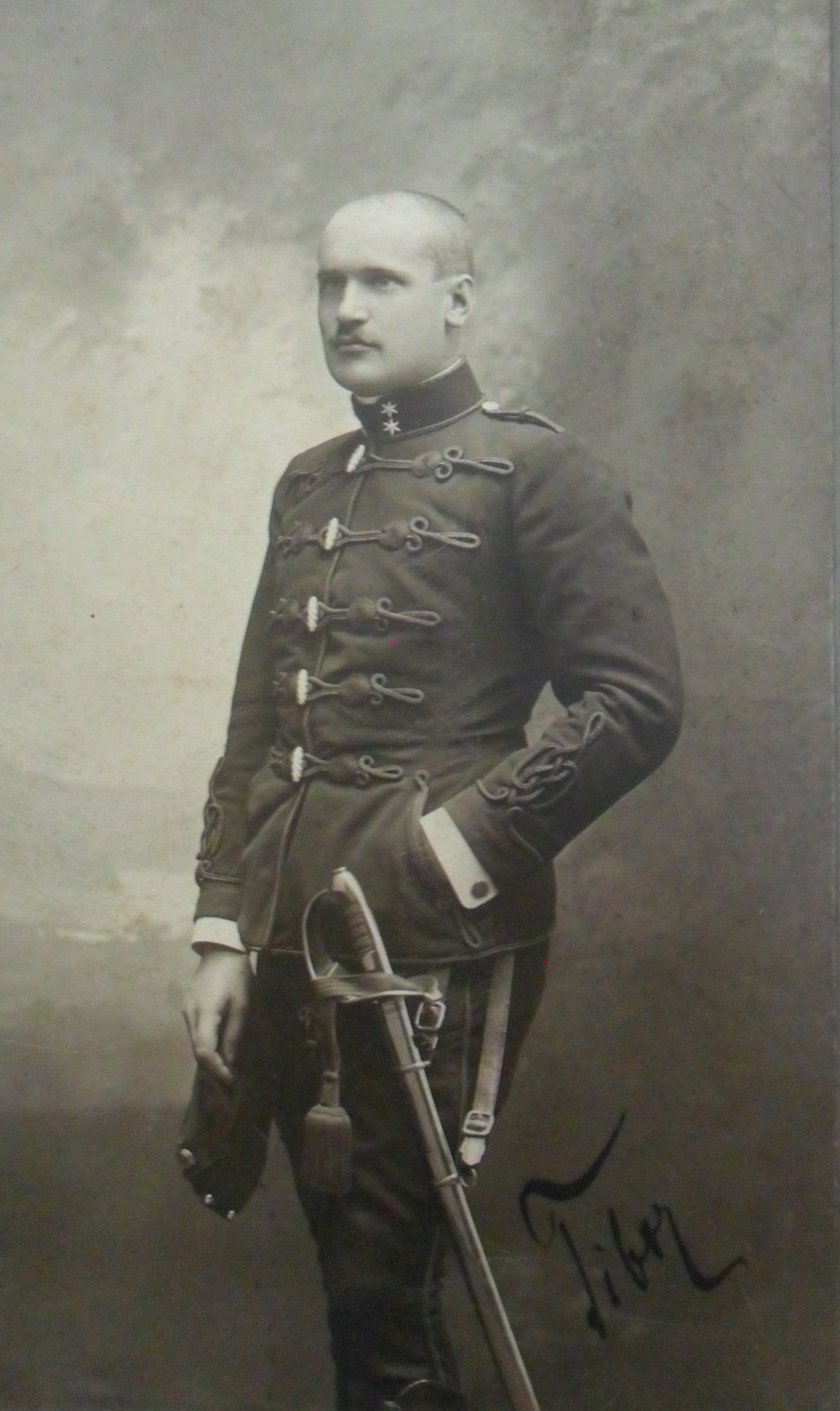
Dr. Tibor Farkas de Boldogfa wearing his Hussar Captain uniform

Tibor József Imre Farkas de Boldogfa was born in Felsőbagod in the county of Zala, Kingdom of Hungary, as the member of the ancient Roman Catholic Hungarian noble family Farkas de Boldogfa (in Hungarian: boldogfai Farkas család). His father was József Farkas de Boldogfa (1857–1951) landowner, politician, Member of the Hungarian Parliament, and his mother was Rozália Sümeghy de Lovász et Szentmargitha (1857–1924). His father József Farkas de Boldogfa was very active in the Hungarian politics since the 1890s, working along with count Aladár Zichy, and count Nándor Zichy within the newly created Hungarian Katolikus Néppárt (Catholic People's Party). Tibor Farkas de Boldogfa's paternal grandparents were Imre Farkas de Boldogfa (1811–1876), jurist, landowner, chief magistrate of the district of Zalaegerszeg (Hungarian: főszolgabíró), and Alojzia Horváth (1831–1919). His maternal grandparents were Ferenc Sümeghy de Lovász et Szentmargitha (1819–1869), jurist, landowner, politician, member of the Hungarian Parliament (who was a very good friend of Ferenc Deák), and Magdolna Séllyey de Séllye (1822–1901). Tibor's younger brother was Dénes Farkas de Boldogfa (1884–1973), landowner, politician, also member of the Hungarian Parliament. In the other hand Tibor's older brother was Kálmán Farkas de Boldogfa (1880–1944), landowner, supreme chief magistrate of the district of Zalaszentgrót (Hungarian: főszolgabíró) in the county of Zala.

Tibor Farkas de Boldogfa finished his general studies of school and high-school with particular teachers and in the Theresianum in Wien. Later he studied law in Wien and at the Faculty of Law of the Eötvös Loránd University where he obtained his PhD degree and approved his lawyer exam in 1910. Then he traveled to England and studied law in the Cambridge University for 3 years. He taught law in the London School of Economics, and traveled actively around England studying the legal part of the industrial sector of that time as well the strikes policies. He moved back to Hungary in 1913, however in February 1914 the Hungarian Minister of Justice sent him back to England for researching further the strike law. The break of the First World War interrupted his researches, and went back to Hungary for serving as a Hussar Captain. He fought in the Italian and in the Russian front and after the War he was invested with the Signum Laudis medal and the Karl Troop Cross.

After the World War I the Treaty of Trianon was implemented and Hungary lost the 70% of its lands. At the same time the King Charles IV of Hungary was not allowed to continue on the Hungarian throne and instead of him the admiral Miklós Horthy de Nagybánya was elected as regent of the Kingdom. Tibor's father, who was over 63 years old for that time, retreated from the politics. Tibor Farkas became one of the most energetic defenders of the Monarchy and of the House of Habsburg in Zala county and in Hungary itself. Tibor had a close friendship with the Marquis György Pallavicini, the Count Antal Sigray and Count János Zichy, who were the most relevant legitimist politicians between the two World Wars in Hungary. He was elected two times as a representative in the Hungarian Parliament: 1922–1926, and 1931–1935. He strongly criticized the government of prime minister count István Bethlen and the high cult to regent Miklós Horthy, considering that these demonstrations of honor and respect actually belonged to the Hungarian King, who was not sitting in the throne for that time. In 1925, at the Zala County general assemble session, the legitimate representative Tibor Farkas de Boldogfa disapproved the celebration of Horthy's birthday and name-day. Tibor emphasized that "all celebrations with splendor must be avoided when the country is a truncated kingdom without a king. If it was a holiday, it would just be a funeral." Tibor Farkas also was against all Nazi politics, considering them anti-Christians, anti-monarchists and absolutely against all ethic and moral; his only goal was to reestablish continuity and see the Habsburgs in the Hungarian throne, and ensure the healthy development and growing of Hungarian agriculturists' way of life. Tibor himself stated that: "I cannot imagine a kingdom without a king, nor can I imagine a golden pengő without gold, nor can I imagine a national unity without the unity of souls".

Tibor Farkas de Boldogfa suffered a sudden appendicitis crisis and was hospitalized in Zalaegerszeg. He died on 26 March 1940.

== Marriage and children ==
He married on 28 December 1929 Judith Pálffy de Pálfiszegh (1909–1993), daughter of the Hungarian nobleman László Pálffy de Pálfiszegh (1872–1946), jurist, landowner, and chief magistrate of the district of Pacsa (Hungarian: főszolgabíró) in Zala county, and Ilona Véssey de Vésse (1882–1956). Judith Pálffy's paternal grandparents were Elek Pálffy de Pálfiszegh (1840–1895), landowner and és Karolin Koltay de Kiskolta (1848–1873); her maternal grandparents László Véssey de Vésse (1852–1897), landowner, and Emília Nedeczky de Nedecze (1859–1944). Pálffy Judith gave birth to two children: Elek and Erzsébet. These two children never had offspring.
