= Ferenc Farkas de Kisbarnak =

Hungarian scout and military officer

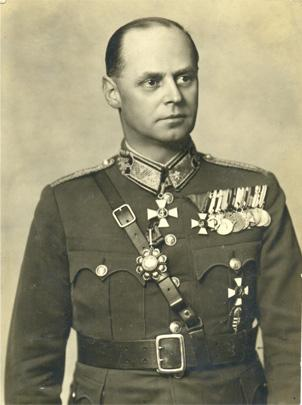
- Born: May 27, 1892; Kismarton, Kingdom of Hungary, Austria-Hungary
- Died: April 14, 1980 (aged 87); Arnstorf, Bavaria, West Germany
- Occupations: General Camp Manager 4th World Jamboree; Chief Scout of Hungarian Scout Movement; Commander, Royal Ludovica Military Academy; General of the Hungarian VI Army Corps, World War II

Ferenc Farkas de Kisbarnak (Hungarian: vitéz kisbarnaki Farkas Ferenc; May 27, 1892 – April 14, 1980) was Chief Scout of the Hungarian Boy Scouts, commanding officer of the Royal Ludovica Military Academy, the country's officer training school, and General of the Hungarian VI Army Corps during World War II. He served under several political regimes including that of Charles IV King of Hungary, Regent Miklós Horthy, Prime Minister Pál Teleki, and Arrow Cross Party leader Ferenc Szálasi. He was the Captain General of the Order of Vitéz between 1962 and 1977. His service through the end of the World War II resulted in controversies within Hungary that followed him until his death.

== Family ==
He was born in the Roman Catholic Hungarian noble family Farkas de Kisbarnak, which can trace back their origins to the first half of the 17th century. His father was Farkas Ferenc de Kisbarnak (1849-1937), captain of the Hungarian Royal army, and notary of Kismarton; his mother was the noble lady Gizella Pottyondy de Potyond et Csáford (1864-1921). His paternal grandfather was Farkas Ferenc de Kisbarnak (1820–1882), administrator of the states of Réde, property of the county Esterházys, and his paternal grandmother was Cecília Hoffmann (1826–1907). His maternal grandparents were Dr. Ágoston Pottyondy de Potyond et Csáford, lawyer, and Mária Grohmann (1840-1918). His paternal uncle was Gyula Farkas de Kisbarnak (1847–1930), Hungarian mathematician and physicist. Vitéz Ferenc Farkas de Kisbarnak's brother was Gyula Farkas de Kisbarnak (1894–1958), literary historian, Finno-Ugric linguist, professor of the University of Göttingen.

== Scouting and Officers Training School ==
In 1933, he was chief organizer and General Camp Manager of the 4th World Scout Jamboree hosted by the Hungarian Boy Scouts at Gödöllő, Hungary, alongside Hungary's Chief Scout and future Prime Minister Pál Teleki. A Catholic, in 1938 Farkas was the chief organizer of a World Eucharistic Congress in Budapest on May 25–29, 1938, at which time he created a lifelong relationship with the Pope and the Vatican.

In the same year he assumed command of the Royal Ludovika Akademia (officer training school) which had been founded in 1872. Among the officers he brought to the Akadémia was 21-year-old Béla Bánáthy, whom Farkas had met as a 14-year-old youth at the 1933 Jamboree. He requested a volunteer to teach leadership at the academy, and Bánáthy was selected. He also asked Bánáthy to organize a Scout Troop for the young men, 19 years and older, which was a common practice within the Hungarian Scout Association at the time. Farkas served as commander of the Royal Ludovika Akadémia through 1943. Banathy served most of the war under Farkas and when it ended, escaped first to Austria and later the United States. He was inspired by his attendance at the 4th World Jamboree where he met Farkas and his Scouting experience teaching leadership at the Ludovika Akadémia. In 1958 he founded the White Stag Leadership Development Program in Monterey, California, which has continually taught leadership to youth since then.

== Chief Scout of Hungary ==
A lifelong supporter of Scouting, Farkas in June 1941 became Chief Scout of Hungary, upon Prime Minister Pál Teleki's suicide and on the eve of Hungary's forced entry into World War II. Under political pressure from the extreme right, the Hungarian Scouting movement became more militaristic and nationalistic between 1941 and 1945. Despite the war, the Hungarian national Scout leadership was able until the end of 1943 to maintain contact with the Boy Scouts International Bureau, the Polish Scout Headquarters in exile, and with Prince Gustav Adolf of Sweden, Chief Scout of Sweden and member of the World Scout Committee. Before the end of World War II, the national Hungarian Scouts were ordered to merge with the extremist right-leaning youth organization Hungarista Örszem, but the merger was never implemented.

Farkas retained the title and role of Chief Scout through World War II. When the Soviet Union occupied the country and forbid organization of Scouting units, he remained Chief Scout of the Hungarian Scout Association in Exteris until his death in 1980.

== Commander of Hungarian Sixth Army Corps ==
In 1943 Farkas assumed command of the Hungarian Sixth Army, which had been garrisoned at Debrecen. During March 1944, Regent Miklós Horthy first set in motion plans for a new Hungarian government loyal to the Allies, but the effort was forestalled after German pressure by Edmund Veesenmayer, Hitler's personal emissary in Hungary. Ferenc Farkas was to have been minister of cultural affairs. In July 1944 he replaced General Károly Beregfy, an Arrow Cross Party member, and under Farkas' the Hungarian VI Army Corps beat back a Red Army attack across the Carpathian mountains, employing brutal methods to keep the Red Army from advancing. He became known as the heroic defender of the Tatár Pass in the Carpathian Mountains.

=== Secret negotiations to surrender ===
As the Soviets advanced on Budapest, the Sixth Army was ordered to Budapest on October 12 where Farkas was briefly named commander of the Pest bridgehead. Regent Miklós Horthy also wanted military units in Budapest commanded by officers he could trust, as he planned to announce an armistice with the Soviet Union as Romania had done, abandoning the lost Axis cause which he had never fully embraced. Germany feared the surrender of Hungary, knowing this would leave their entire southern flank open to Soviet attack.

=== Fall of Regent Horthy ===
Working through his trustworthy General Béla Miklós who was in contact with Soviet forces in eastern Hungary, Regent Horthy attempted to negotiate the end of the war, seeking to surrender to the Soviets while preserving the government's autonomy. The Soviets willingly promised this. But the Germans were aware of Horthy's behind-the-scenes maneuvering and set in place Operation Panzerfaust which would remove him from power and replace his government with forces loyal to the German cause, effectively occupying Hungary. Horthy governed from Castle Hill in central Budapest, an ancient and now well-guarded fortress. At 2:00 p.m. on October 15, 1944, Horthy announced over the radio that Hungary had signed an armistice with the Soviet Union. "It is clear today that Germany has lost the war... Hungary has accordingly concluded a preliminary armistice with Russia, and will cease all hostilities against her."

Failing to receive official orders, the Hungarian army ignored the armistice, surprising the Germans. Given that many Hungarian units were controlled by the German army, it is unclear whether orders, if issued, ever reached most of the line troops. There had also been considerable propaganda about the harsh, punitive treatment of prisoners by the Soviets, and some Hungarian forces had witnessed first-hand the atrocities Soviet perpetrated against civilians. Combined with their loyalty to their country, no matter what government was in charge, they felt it was their duty to fight even when the result was predictable.

Horthy's son Miklós Horthy, Jr. at this father's direction went to a meeting with representatives from the Yugoslavian government to finalize the surrender of Hungary to the Soviets. Upon entering the building, he was attacked and beaten by German soldiers commanded by Waffen SS Major Otto Skorzeny, who had initiated the meeting as a ruse. They kidnapped Miklós at gunpoint, trussed him up in a carpet, and immediately drove him to the airport, where a flight was waiting to take him to Germany and a concentration camp. Skorzeny then brazenly led a convoy of Germany troops and four Tiger II tanks to the Vienna Gates of Castle Hill. Seeking to avoid unneeded bloodshed, and knowing his forces could not resist the superior German troops, the Regent ordered his soldiers to not resist. Only one unit did not get the order, and the Germans quickly and with minimal bloodshed captured Castle Hill. Only seven soldiers were killed and 26 men were wounded. Horthy was arrested by Waffen SS Brigadeführer Edmund Veesenmayer and held overnight in SS offices. Faced with an overt threat to his son's life, and having already been effectively removed from power, under coercion and as a prisoner of war, he abrogated the armistice, deposed Premier Géza Lakatos' government, and named the leader of the fanatical Arrow Cross Party, Ferenc Szálasi, as Prime Minister.

Horthy was placed on a private train to Germany three days later. Skorzeny told Horthy that he would be a "guest of honor" in a secure Bavarian castle. Skorzeny personally escorted Horthy to his captivity, where he was held until the war ended.

== Service at end of war ==
In the final months of the war, Farkas presided over the trial of fellow Lieutenant General Lajos Veres von Dalnoki (former commander of the Hungarian Second Army) and Captain Kálmán Hardy (aide-de-camp to Horthy), who were charged by the Arrow Cross government with treason for having attempted to arrange a cease-fire or switching allegiance during the last days of the war. He sentenced both to death, though neither was executed.

After Ferenc Szálasi assumed power, Farkas was not dismissed despite his previous loyalty to Horthy, and he swore an oath to the new Prime Minister. Károly Beregfy, newly appointed on October 17, 1944, by the Arrow Cross government as Minister of War and Commander in Chief of the Hungarian Army, named Farkas as Government Commissioner for Evacuation, promoted him to General, and put him in charge of securing national treasures.

He was later accused of sending to Austria about USD$3 billion in national treasures, "including the crown jewels, priceless gold treasures and the collection of national seals." The crown jewels were in fact captured in Mattsee, Austria on May 4, 1945, by the U.S. 86th Infantry Division. The jewels were then transported to Western Europe and eventually given to the United States Army for safekeeping from the Soviet Union. For much of the Cold War, it was held at the United States Bullion Depository (Fort Knox, Kentucky) alongside the bulk of America's gold reserves and other priceless historical items. U.S. President Jimmy Carter ordered extensive historical research to verify the crown as genuine, and it was returned to the Hungarian people on January 6, 1978. None of the charges against Farkas relating to the expropriation of Hungarian treasures and seals was substantiated.

Facing the imminent fall of the government and the nation, the Hungarian Defense Ministry named Farkas as the leader of a four-man committee which was charged with representing the Hungarian Army with the Allies after the war's end. General officers of the Hungarian Army who returned to Hungary under Communist rule were likely to be arrested and become Prisoners of War again, and face charges and possible execution. Farkas drove across Austria and France to General George S. Patton's headquarters. Farkas was placed in a prisoner of war camp in Foucarville, near Sainte-Mère-Église, Normandy, which housed 40,000 prisoners, including 218 generals and 6 admirals.

== Post World War II activities ==
=== U.S. Army liaison ===
In October 1946, 26 other Hungarian Army generals in the Foucarville POW camp wrote a letter to the American military, requesting that Farkas be released. In January 1947 he became the U.S. liaison to Hungarian prisoners of war and assisted in resolving their displaced person status and living arrangements. He remained in Germany becoming the highest-ranking Hungarian officer to settle in a country controlled by the Allies.

His war-time role in the Army, especially after the Arrow Cross Party assumed command, became very controversial within Hungary. Because of his actions in the camps against the Arrow Cross Party and Szálasi's government, the Provisional Hungarian Government of 1945, led by the Soviet forces in Debrecen, reduced his former Army rank to a private.

=== Pál Teleki Scout Association ===
While in the displaced persons camp, he founded the Pál Teleki Scout Association, which in 1948 was renamed the Hungarian Scout Association in Exile, and after the fall of the Iron Curtain, the Hungarian Scout Association Abroad. He was named Training Camp Chief and later Chief Commissioner (Hungarian: Bodnar Gabor). He also led adult leader training for Hungarian Scout leaders in exile in several locations within Germany during the late 1940s, and later at numerous locations abroad. He recommended Béla H. Bánáthy, a Hungarian Scout leader and one of his former officers with whom he had maintained a relationship, for a position as a Hungarian language instructor at the U.S. government's new Army Language School. During 1952, Farkas visited the United States and met with adult leaders at a training camp for Hungarian Scouts in Exile held in Buffalo, New York. He remained the Hungarian Chief Scout until his death in 1980.

=== Anti-Soviet activities ===
He was founder of a Hungarian veteran's organization for veterans in exile, the Magyar Harcosok Bajtársi Közössége Központja (World Federation of Hungarian Veterans). He suggested creating a fraternal organization to honor the officers, non-commissioned officers, and enlisted men who served in the Hungarian armed forces and were now in exile. He suggested to Béla Almay, a former Lieutenant Colonel on the Hungarian General Staff, that he organize an association for Hungarian veterans, which became the Collegiate Society of Hungarian Veterans.

Farkas also attempted with the support of former members of the Hungarian government who had escaped to the west before the war to establish a Hungarian government in exile, but was frustrated in his efforts by American Occupation Forces in Germany who forbid it. The veteran's organization retained as one of its purposes support for the restoration of a democratic government in Hungary.

During 1947, the Americans and French permitted him to found the Anti-Bolshevik Hungarian Liberation Movement in Landshut, Germany. The movement initially called for a violent revolution in Hungary against Soviet control. It arranged for a member in exile to return to Hungary illegally and assess the situation and support for overthrow of the Communist government. What it learned was discouraging and the only hope the group held out for liberation of Hungary was Western help, which was not forthcoming. By 1950, Farkas was a leader of the reactionary, right-wing Anti-Bolshevik Bloc of Nations (ABN) which openly advocated the destruction of the Soviet Union and its fifth columnists. During the 1950 convention of the ABN, Farkas made an early prediction that the USSR would dissolve due to the pressures of its internal non-Russian nationalities.

== Conviction, death, and restoration ==
When World War II ended and for several years afterward, the Communist government organized and encouraged the arrest and execution of those they blamed for the deprivations the war visited upon the Hungarian population. These arrests and prosecutions were in many instances politically motivated and the legal process was later found to lack the minimum requirements for legal action.

Farkas was convicted in absentia by the Budapest High Court of the Hungarian Communist government on March 30, 1950, and was stripped of his rank and sentenced to life imprisonment. He visited the United States and Canada during 1955 and met with Hungarian Scouts in exile. In 1962, he was named General Captain (Hungarian: Fõkapitány) of The Knightly Order of Vitéz, a role in which he continued to serve through 1977. He also continued his involvement with Scouting both locally and internationally, serving as Chief Scout of Hungary for the Hungarian Scout Association Abroad. He died in Arnstorf, Germany on April 14, 1980.

In late 1998, the Hungarian Republic Supreme Court found serious legal and procedural errors in his original 1950 trial and on December 7, 1998, rescinded the sentence, nullifying its results. On September 15, 2006, the Hungarian Defence Ministry's Rehabilitation Committee fully reinstated his military rank and overturned his conviction posthumously.

Honorary titles
Preceded by Archduke Joseph August	Captain General of the Order of Vitéz; 1962–1977	Succeeded by Archduke Joseph Árpád
