= Sárosd =

Village in Fejér County, Hungary

- Large village
- Flag Coat of arms

- Location of Fejér county in Hungary

- Location of Sárosd
- Coordinates: 47.04153°N 18.64890°E
- Country: Hungary
- County: Fejér
- District: Székesfehérvár

Area
  - Total: 48.12 km^{2} (18.58 sq mi)

Population (2004)
  - Total: 3,462
  - Density: 71.94/km^{2} (186.3/sq mi)
- Time zone: UTC+1 (CET)
  - Summer (DST): UTC+2 (CEST)
- Postal code: 2433
- Area code: (+36) 25

Sárosd is a large village in Fejér county, Hungary.

== People ==
- Gyula Farkas (mathematician), famous for Farkas' lemma
