= Hugó Sónyi =

Hungarian military officer

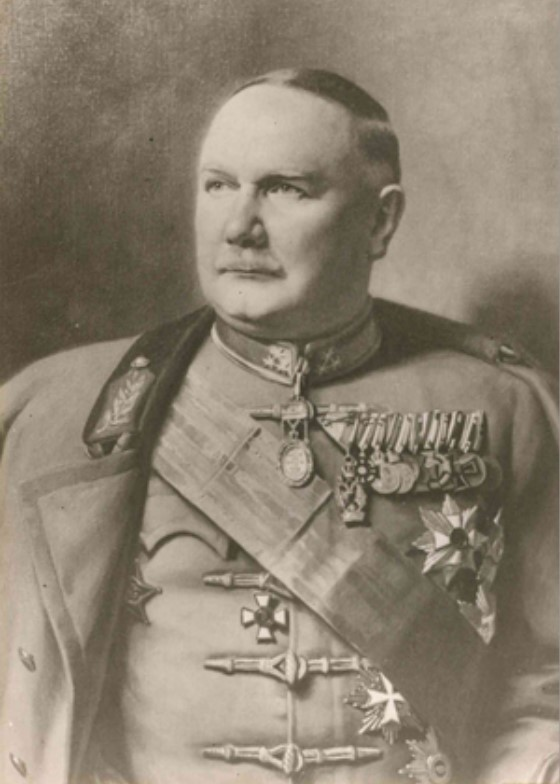
General Hugó Sónyi ca 1940

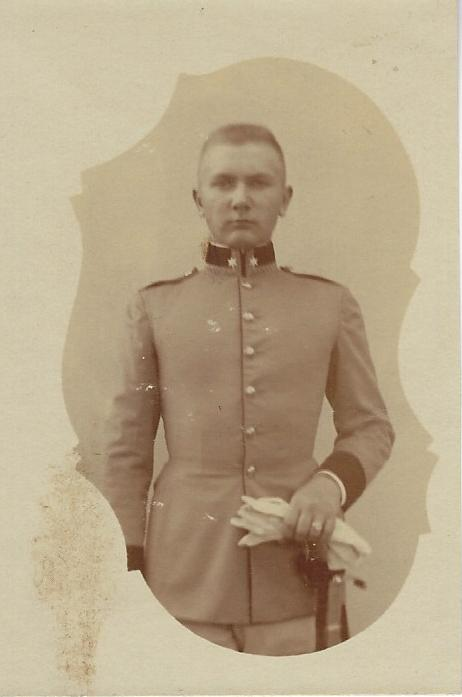
Hugó Sónyi Vienna 1902

Hugó Sónyi (Wölkersdorf 2 March, 1883 - 7 June, 1958 Ratingen, West Germany) was a Hungarian military officer and politician who served as the Commander-in-Chief of the Royal Hungarian Army. He was a member of the House of Magnates, and the Captain General of the Hungarian Order of Vitéz.

== Biography ==
Hugó Sónyi was born on March 2, 1883, in Wölkersdorf. His original name was Solarcz; he changed his name in 1934 to Sónyi

=== Education and military service ===
Hugó began his military studies in 1897 at the Prodi Military School in Budapest. He graduated in 1900 and then began his service in Imperial and Royal 4th Bosnian Regiment. In 1906 he attended the Imperial and Royal Military Academy in Vienna and graduated in 1909. He subsequently joined World War I as a member of the Corps' General Staff and served first on the Serbian and Italian battlefields, and then later in Albania and Macedonia.

During the Hungarian Soviet Republic, he was commander of the 29th Brigade in the victorious campaign against the Czechs. After the revolutions and the reorganization of the army, he was appointed to the Ministry of Defense where he headed the presidential department between 1925 and 1929. On November 1, 1927, he was promoted to the rank of General. From November 1, 1929, through May 1, 1933, he was the infantry commander of the 1st Joint Brigade, and later the head of administration and commander of the city of Budapest. On May 1, 1934, he was appointed commander of the 7th Joint Brigade.

From September 1936 to March 1940 he was the commander-in-chief of the Royal Hungarian Army.

From 1935 to 1939 Hugó Sónyi held a seat in the House of Magnates, and was given the title of Royal Privy Councilor on October 22, 1938.

== Honors ==
- Knight Grand Cross Order of St. Sylvester (1 May, 1939)
- Captain General, Order of Vitéz

== In Exile ==
- He left for West Germany in 1944
- He died in Ratingen, West Germany on June 7, 1958.
