= Slovenský skauting =

National Scout and Guide organization of Slovakia

- Scouting Slovakia
- Country: Slovakia
- Founded: 1919/1992
- Membership: 7600 (2019)
- Chief Scout: Peter Linek
- President: Juraj Lizák
- Affiliation: World Organization of the Scout Movement, World Association of Girl Guides and Girl Scouts
- Website scouting.sk

Slovenský skauting (Scouting Slovakia), is the primary national Scouting and Guiding organization of Slovakia. Currently has around 7000 members. With 3,157 Scouts (as of 2011) and about 3,000 Guides (as of 2004). Slovenský Skauting is the largest youth organization in Slovakia and a member of both the World Organization of the Scout Movement and the World Association of Girl Guides and Girl Scouts.

== History ==
The first Scout troop in the area that comprises Slovakia, while under the Austro-Hungarian Empire, was founded in 1912. Scouting in Slovakia started in connection with Hungarian Scouting as Slovakia was, at the time, economically and socially linked more closely with the Hungarian parts of the Empire.

From the start, Scouting in Czechoslovakia was open to boys and girls working in separate units. Groups of Girl Scouts began to form between 1918 and 1922 in various towns. In 1919 the Association of the Scouts and Guides of the Republic of Czechoslovakia was founded, and the association became a founder member of WAGGGS in 1928. Girl Scouting grew and progressed until 1939.

As part of the fledgling Czechoslovakia, Slovakia was a Founding Member of WOSM from 1922 to 1948, with an interstice in which Scouting ceased to exist as a result of Nazi German occupation in 1940, when the government banned Scouting. After World War II and the 1944 national uprising, Scouting reemerged and was recognized by the state of Czechoslovakia. During the later period of Soviet dominance, like the neighboring Czech Republic and Hungary, Scouting went underground to reemerge under more suitable conditions.

After the November 1989 Velvet Revolution, Scouting was one of the first organisations to re-emerge from working underground. By the close of 1989, the number of Scouts in Czechoslovakia was 80,000. On February 1, 1990, the Federation of Czech and Slovak Scouting was officially registered, paving the way for its re-admittance to the World Organization during the World Scout Conference in Paris in July 1990, re-recognised by the major world Scouting organisations. Slovak Scouting returned as part of federated Scouting in Czechoslovakia from 1990 to 1992. Upon Czechoslovakia's dissolution on December 31, 1992, Slovenský Skauting and Cesky Junák were required to apply for membership of the World Organization as the national member organizations of the Republic of Slovakia and the Czech Republic, respectively. Slovakia was welcomed as a member of the World Organization of the Scout Movement in its own right since 1997.

Since Czechoslovakia split in two, Slovenský Skauting has started independent development, working hard to train its leaders and to update its youth programme. Several training courses have taken place over the last decade, and a Strategic Planning Seminar is being organized with the support of the European Scout Office. Despite being a landlocked nation, Slovenský Skauting maintains a section of Sea Scouts.

Roma Scout badge

Since 2000 there has been a special program for Scouting in the Romani community.

There are also troops for children with special needs.

The Slovak noun for a single Scout is Skaut.

== Program and ideals ==
Slovak Sea Scouting badge

=== Program sections ===
- Cubs/Brownies - ages 7 to 10
- Scouts/Guides - ages 11 to 14
- Rangers - ages 15 to 18
- Rovers - ages 19 to 24
- Adult in scouting - ages 25 and more

=== Scout mottoes ===
The Cub Scout/Brownie Motto is Be Better. The Guide/Scout Motto is Buď Pripravený, translating as Be Prepared in Slovak. The Rover Motto is Serve.

=== Scout oath ===
Brownies/Cub Scouts:

With the help of God, I promise to do my best.
To help other people, to make a good turn everyday
To keep the Brownie/Cub Scout Law.

Guides/Boy Scouts:

On my honour, I promise to do my best,
To do my duty to God and to my country,
To help other people at all times
And to keep the Guide/Scout Law.

=== Scout law ===
Brownies/Cub Scout Law:

- A Brownie/Cub says the truth
- A Brownie/Cub helps others.
- A Brownie/Cub listens.
- A Brownie/Cub is a friend.
- A Brownie/Cub takes care of nature.

Guide/Boy Scout Law:

- A Scout's honour is to be trusted.
- A Scout is loyal.
- A Scout is to be useful and to help others.
- A Scout is a friend of all people of goodwill and a brother/sister to every other Scout.
- A Scout is courteous.
- A Scout protects nature and all valuable creations of people.
- A Scout obeys his/her parents, principals and leaders.
- A Scout is cheerful and considerate
- A Scout is thrifty.
- A Scout is clean in thought, word and deed.

As Native American symbology and mythology has been popular in Central Europe since the 1880s, the highest rank is the Three Feathers of Eagle in Slovak (Tri orlie perá). This rank consists of 3 quests:

1. 24 hours silence
2. 24 hours hunger
3. 24 hours solitude without being seen, but watching what is happening in the camp

Usually this rank is done in Scout camp during the summer.

== Sources ==
- distilled from Eurofax 65, February 1998. Eurofax is the monthly newsletter of the European Region of the World Organization of the Scout Movement (WOSM). It is produced by the European Scout Office and is distributed to all member associations in the European Scout Region and the Europe Region WAGGGS, and others.
- The Scout Oath and Law was translated to English by Jozef Baláž, Assistant International Commissioner, Slovakia
