= Magyar Cserkészlány Szövetség =

- Association of Hungarian Girl Guides
- Country: Hungary
- Founded: 1921/1989
- Affiliation: World Association of Girl Guides and Girl Scouts
- Website web.archive.org/web/20070319082937/http://www.cserkeszlanyok.hu:80/

Girl Guides in Hungary are served by the Association of Hungarian Girl Guides (Hungarian: Magyar Cserkészlány Szövetség), with 512 members as of 2003. Founded in 1919, the girls-only organization became a full member of the World Association of Girl Guides and Girl Scouts in 1928, and an associate member again in 1993. It regained full membership in 2008.

== History ==
The first Guide group in Hungary was set up in 1919. The National Association of Hungarian Girl Guides was founded in 1921 and received as a member of the International Council, the forerunner of WAGGGS, in 1922. In 1928, the Hungarian Girl Guide association acted as hostess to the fifth International Conference of Guiding when the WAGGGS was founded. In 1939, the first Girl Guide and Girl Scout World Camp, Pax Ting, was held in Hungary, and attended by some 4000 Guides from around the world. During World War II the movement was involved in relief work in hospitals and helping refugees. With the siege of the capital, the association's activities were suspended. Guiding activities resumed after the war, but in 1948 the government banned all youth organizations, and the association was forced to cease functioning for the next 40 years. The first attempts to reorganize the movement started in 1988 as a response to political change in Hungary. In 1989, the Association of Hungarian Girl Guides was relaunched. A central committee concentrated on training potential leaders. In 1996 there were 20 troops, mostly working in schools.

== Program and ideals ==
The Guide Motto is Jó Munkát. The Magyar noun for a single Guide is Cserkész.

=== Guide Promise ===
Fogadom, hogy híven teljesítem kötelességeimet, amelyekkel Istennek, hazámnak és embertársaimnak tartozom. Minden tőlem telhetőt megteszek, hogy másoknak segitsek. Ismerem a cserkésztörvényt, és azt mindenkor megtartom.
I promise that I will do the duties I owe to God, my motherland, and my fellow beings. I will do my best to help others. I know the Girl Guide Laws and I will always comply with them.

=== Guide Law ===
1. A cserkészlány egyeneslelkű, és feltétlenül igazat mond.
  The Girl Guide is honest and always tells the truth.
2. A cserkészlány híven teljesíti kötelességeit.
  The Girl Guide performs her duties faithfully.
3. A cserkészlány ahol tud, segít.
  The Girl Guide helps where she can.
4. A cserkészlány minden cserkészt testvérének tekint.
  The Girl Guide considers every Scout/Guide her brother or sister.
5. A cserkészlány gyöngéd másokkal, szigorú önmagával szemben.
  The Girl Guide is tender with others but strict with herself.
6. A cserkészlány szereti a természetet, jó az állatokhoz, kíméli a növényeket.
  The Girl Guide loves nature, she is good to animals, and spares plants.
7. A cserkészlány vezetőivel tevékenyen és készségesen működik együtt.
  The Girl Guide cooperates with her leaders briskly and willingly.
8. A cserkészlány vidám és meggondolt.
  The Girl Guide is joyful and prudent.
9. A cserkészlány takarékos.
  The Girl Guide is frugal.
10. A cserkészlány testben és lélekben tiszta.
  The Girl Guide is clean in body and soul.

== See also ==
- Magyar Cserkészszövetség
