= Hungarian Scout Association in Slovakia =

Szlovákiai Magyar Cserkészszövetség
- Headquarters: Dunajská Streda, Slovakia
- Country: Slovakia
- Founded: 11 March 1991
- Executive manager: Szilárd Csémi
- Website; Website of the Hungarian Scout Association in Slovakia

The Hungarian Scout Association in Slovakia (Hungarian: Szlovákiai Magyar Cserkészszövetség, SZMCS) is the Scouting organization of Hungarians in Slovakia. Currently, there are about 50 Scout groups with around 1,500 active Scouts.

== History ==
In Upper Hungary (mostly the territory of present-day Slovakia), the first Scout group was formed in Komárom/Komárno in 1913, the members of which already participated in one of the first major events of Hungarian Scouting, the raft tour on the River Vág (Hungarian: Vág, Slovak: Vah). After the Treaty of Trianon, the Hungarian Scout groups that found themselves in Czechoslovakia were hard run. Czechoslovak authorities did not allow the formation of their own Hungarian Scout association. After 1926, they were allowed to be members of the Czechoslovak Scout Association. This arrangement did not support them, but their functioning was legalized.

The teams operated within the framework of the Hungarian Scout Association on the territories re-attached to Hungary by the First Vienna Award.

On March 11, 1990, the Hungarian Scout Association in Slovakia was formed, and was officially approved by the Slovak Ministry of the Interior on April 6, 1990.
