= Imre Hideghéthy =

Hungarian politician

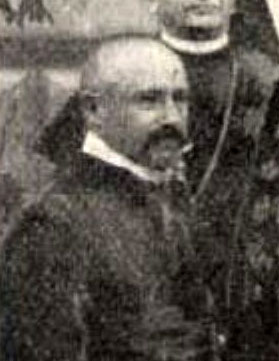

Minister of Croatian Affairs of Hungary
- In office 16 January 1916 – 15 June 1917
- Preceded by: István Tisza
- Succeeded by: Aladár Zichy

Personal details
- Born: 1 September 1860 Bogdanovci, Croatia-Slavonia, Austrian Empire
- Died: 19 October 1920 (aged 60) Budapest, Kingdom of Hungary
- Party: Croatian National Party
- Profession: politician

Imre Hideghéthy (1 September 1860 – 19 October 1920) was a Hungarian politician who served as Minister without portfolio of Croatian Affairs between 1916 and 1917.

Political offices
Preceded by István Tisza	Minister of Croatian Affairs; 1916–1917	Succeeded by Aladár Zichy
