= Jacob Katz =

Jewish historian and educator

- יעקב כ"ץ
- Born: 15 November 1904; Magyargencs, Hungary
- Died: 20 May 1998 (aged 93); Israel
- Awards: Israel Prize (1980); Honorary member of the American Academy of Arts and Sciences

Academic background
- Education: University of Frankfurt

Academic work
- Discipline: History
- Sub-discipline: Jewish history; Sociology of Jewish communities
- Institutions: Hebrew University of Jerusalem
- Notable works: Exclusiveness and Tolerance; Tradition and Crisis; Out of the Ghetto

Jacob Katz (Hebrew: יעקב כ"ץ) (born 15 November 1904 in Magyargencs, Hungary, died 20 May 1998 in Israel) was an acclaimed Jewish historian and educator.

Katz described "traditional society" and deployed sociological methods in his study of Jewish communities, with special attention to changes in halakhah (Jewish law) and Orthodoxy. He pioneered the modern study of Orthodoxy and its formation in reaction to Reform Judaism.

In his youth he pursued both religious and secular studies, receiving rabbinic ordination and a doctorate in social history.

== Biography ==
Jacob Katz was born in Magyargencs (Moyorganch) in western Hungary. The village was not large enough for a Jewish school so he spent his early years at a Protestant school in a nearby village. At the age of 12, he left to study in Celldomolk. Afternoon hours were devoted to Jewish studies in the Talmud-Torah of the community. During this period he lived with a host family and returned home every few weeks for Sabbaths and holidays.

At age 16, he moved to Gyor where he studied at a yeshiva. He then studied for about two years at the yeshiva in the Satoralya-Uihey community. In 1925, he moved to the Yeshiva of Pressburg (Bratislava) founded by Hatam Sofer and headed by his descendants. After two and a half years, he became interested in the work of Friedrich Schiller, Theodore Herzl and Ahad Ha'am.

In 1927, Katz wrote his first article for an Orthodox newspaper in Budapest, Zsido Ujsag, to protest against a local rabbi who warned Hungarian Jews stay away from Zionist or quasi-Zionist activities. The article was reprinted in the Zionist newspaper of Hungary Zsido Szemle, which praised him for understanding of the needs of the times better than the leaders of Orthodoxy. Katz was asked to write for the paper. Katz expressed admiration for Rabbi Meir Berlin (Bar-Ilan), Nahum Sokolov and Ze'ev Jabotinsky, who regarded building up Israel as the primary task of the generation.

In the spring of 1928, he moved to Yeshivat Adat Yeshuron in Frankfurt, which was headed by Rabbi Yosef Breuer, and applied to study at the University of Frankfurt. In the spring of 1934, he submitted his doctoral thesis on the assimilation of German Jews. He earned a living giving private lessons in Judaism/Talmud to members of Rabbi Breuer's family and others. It was then that he met his future wife Gerti-Bina nee Birnbaum, whom he married in Jerusalem in 1936. Before immigrating to Mandatory Palestine, he spent a year in London to improve his English.

In Tel Aviv, he worked as a tutor and accepted a teaching position at Moriya school. In 1945-1950, he served as a teacher and director of Talpiot, a teachers training college.

He was married to Bina for 62 years, until his death at age 93. The couple had three sons, David, Chanan and Uriel. At the time of his death he had 11 grandchildren.

== Academic career ==
In 1945 Katz presented his article "Marriage and Sexual Relations at the close of the Middle Ages" at a conference of historians. The article was published that year in the Hebrew journal Zion. Katz published in the fields of education, psychology and pedagogy, but his main interest was history. Ben-Zion Dinur encouraged him to continue his research despite the absence of an academic post. in 1947, Katz was invited to the first International Congress of Jewish studies in Jerusalem. in 1949, he began to teach at the Hebrew University in a low level position.

He went on to become specialist in Jewish-gentile relations, the Haskalah, anti-Semitism, and the Holocaust. His work provided much of the basis for scholarly analyses of anti-Semitism.

== Awards and recognition ==
Katz was recognized as "one of this century's greatest and most influential historians of the Jews." In 1974 he became an honorary member of the American Academy of Arts and Sciences.

In 1980, Katz was awarded the Israel Prize, for "history of the Jewish people.

== Published works ==
- Tradition and Crisis: Jewish Society at the End of the Middle Ages
- From Prejudice to Destruction: Anti-Semitism, 1700-1933
- Exclusiveness and Tolerance: Studies in Jewish-Gentile Relations in Medieval and Modern Times
- The Darker Side of Genius
- Out of the Ghetto: The Social Background of Jewish Emancipation, 1770-1870
- The "Shabbes Goy"
- Divine Law in Human Hands: Case Studies in Halakhic Flexibility
- A House Divided: Orthodoxy and Schism in Nineteenth-Century Central European Jewry

== See also ==
- List of Israel Prize recipients
