= Gyula Farkas (linguist) =

Farkas Gyula de Kisbarnak, or Julius von Farkas de Kisbarnak (Hungarian: kisbarnaki Farkas Gyula (27 September 1894, in Kismarton/Eisenstadt, Sopron megye – 12 July 1958, in Göttingen) was a Hungarian literary historian and Finno-Ugric linguist.

== Biography ==
He was born into the Roman Catholic Transdanubian Hungarian noble family Farkas de Kisbarnak. His father was Ferenc Farkas de Kisbarnak (1849–1937), captain of the Hungarian Royal army, notary of Kismarton and his mother was Gizella Pottyondy de Potyond und Csáford (1864–1921). His paternal grandfather was Farkas Ferenc de Kisbarnak (1820–1882), administrator of the states of Réde, property of the county Esterházys, and his paternal grandmother was Cecília Hoffmann (1826–1907). His maternal grandparents were dr. Ágoston Pottyondy de Potyond et Csáford, lawyer, and Mária Grohmann (1840–1918). His paternal uncle was Gyula Farkas de Kisbarnak (1847–1930), Hungarian mathematician and physicist. His brother was Ferenc Farkas de Kisbarnak, General of the Hungarian VI Army Corps during World War II.

In the 1920s Gyula was a coworker of Róbert Gragger (1887–1926) at the Hungarian Institute of the Friedrich-Wilhelms-Universität in Berlin. During World War II he was head of the German-Hungarian Society. He founded the Finno-Ugric seminar at the University of Göttingen in 1947.

He wrote over nineteen books dealing with various aspects of Hungarian literature and language, including titles published in German and Hungarian.

== Literary works ==
- Die Entwicklung der ungarischen Literatur, 1934
- Der ungarische Vormärz Petöfis Zeitalter. 1943 (held in 13 US libraries)
- Geschichte der ungarischen Literaturwissenschaft, 1944
