= Aleksandar Farkaš =

Serbian politician

- Born: May 7, 1976 (age 49)
- Occupation: Politician

Aleksandar Farkaš (Serbian Cyrillic: Александар Фаркаш; born 07.05.1976) is a politician in Serbia. He has served in the Assembly of Vojvodina since 2016 as a member of the Serbian Progressive Party.

== Private career ==
Farkaš holds a Bachelor of Laws degree and lives in Zrenjanin. He is not to be confused with a different Aleksandar Farkaš from Pančevo who is also active with the Progressive Party.

== Politician ==
Farkaš received the thirty-ninth position on the Progressive Party's electoral list in the 2016 Vojvodina provincial election and was elected when the list won a majority victory with sixty-three out of 120 mandates. During his first term, he promoted a project for the construction of a new sports center in the Mužlja area of Zrenjanin.

He received the forty-first position on the Progressive-led Aleksandar Vučić — For Our Children list in the 2020 provincial election and was re-elected when the list won an increased majority with seventy-six mandates. He is a member of the assembly committee on national equality and the committee on establishing the equal authenticity of provincial legislation in the languages in official use.

In recent years, Farkaš has been involved in an internal party rivalry with Goran Knežević, a dominant figure in the Progressive Party's organization in Zrenjanin.
