= Magyargencs =

- Location of Veszprém county in Hungary

- Location of Magyargencs
- Coordinates: 47.37630°N 17.28541°E
- Country: Hungary
- County: Veszprém

Area
  - Total: 38.01 km^{2} (14.68 sq mi)

Population (2004)
  - Total: 619
  - Density: 16.28/km^{2} (42.2/sq mi)
- Time zone: UTC+1 (CET)
  - Summer (DST): UTC+2 (CEST)
- Postal code: 8517
- Area code: 89

Magyargencs is a village in Veszprém county, Hungary.

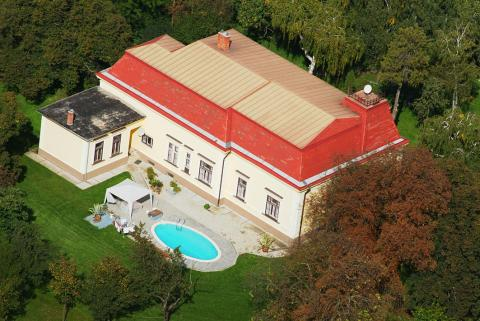

== Notable residents ==
- Jacob Katz (1904–1998), Israeli historian and educator.
- father of Don Shula, came from Magyargencs to Ohio
