= József Farkas =

József Farkas may refer to:

- József Farkas (politician) (1857–1951), Hungarian politician
- József Farkas (table tennis), Hungarian table tennis player
- József Farkas (footballer, born 1966), Hungarian footballer and manager
- József Farkas (footballer, born 1970), Hungarian footballer
- József Farkas (handballer), Hungarian former member of SC Pick Szeged
- József Farkas (wrestler) (born 1952), Hungarian wrestler
