= Róbert Gragger =

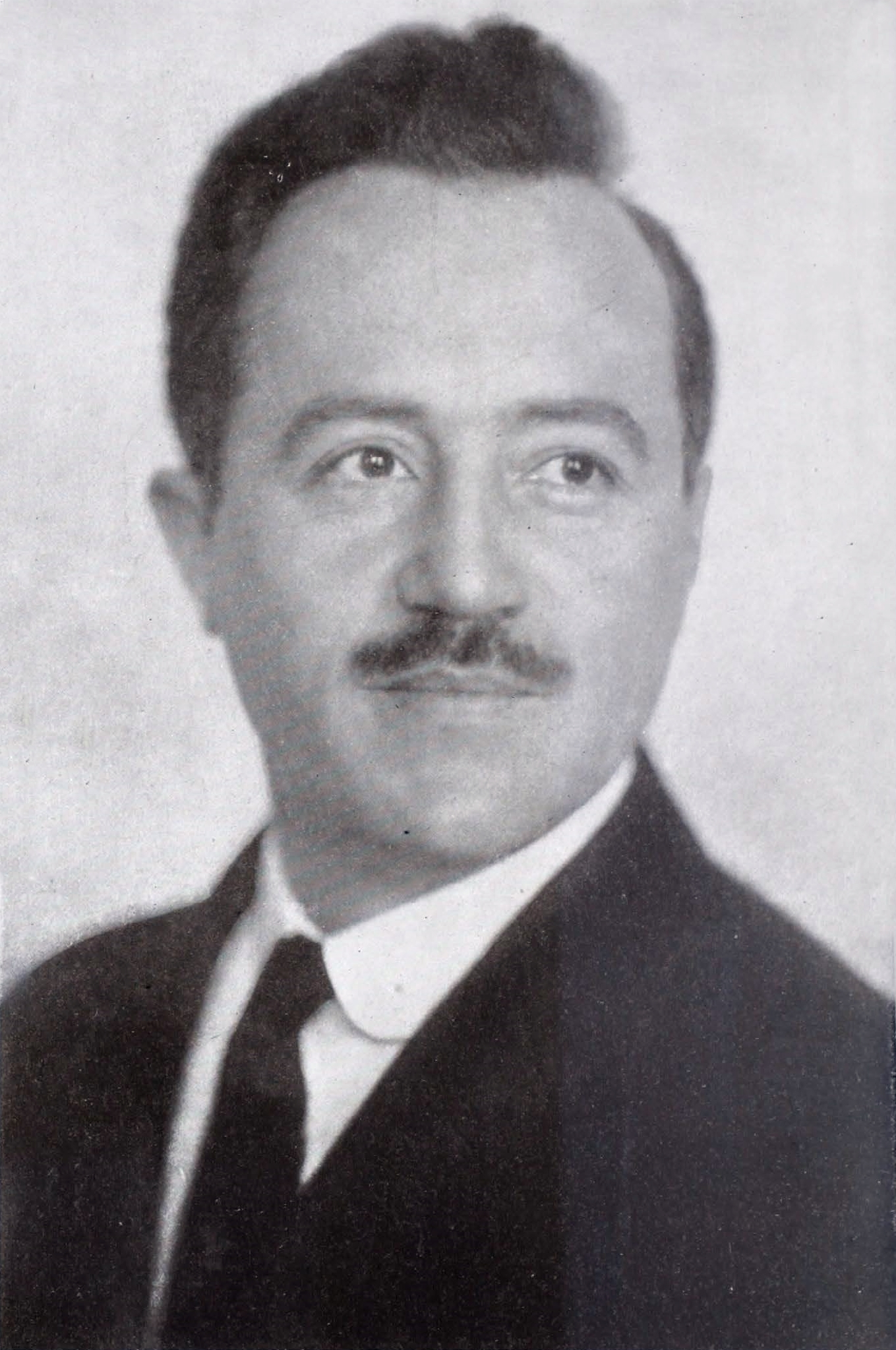
Róbert Gragger (1925)

Róbert Gragger (born 7 November 1887 in Aranyosmarót, died 10 November 1926 in Berlin) was a Hungarian literary historian, university professor and philologist who created his academic work predominantly in Germany, at the University of Berlin.

== See also ==
- Gyula Farkas (linguist)
