= Gavril Farkas =

Gavril Marius Farkas (born 1973) is a Hungarian-Romanian-German mathematician specializing in algebraic geometry. He is known for his work on algebraic curves, moduli spaces, and syzygies of algebraic varieties. Farkas is a professor of mathematics at the Humboldt University of Berlin.

== Education and career ==
Farkas was born in Oradea, Romania, and earned his Bachelor of Science degree in mathematics from Babeș-Bolyai University in Cluj-Napoca, Romania, in 1995, specializing in geometry and topology. He obtained a Master of Science degree from the Mathematical Research Institute in the Netherlands in 1996 and completed his PhD at the University of Amsterdam in 2000 with thesis The Birational Geometry of the Moduli Space of Curves written under the direction of Gerard van der Geer.

He has held academic positions at the University of Michigan, Princeton University, and the University of Texas at Austin before becoming a full professor at Humboldt University in 2007.

== Honors ==
- 2023 Elected member of Academia Europaea
- 2022 Elected full member of the Berlin-Brandenburg Academy of Sciences and Humanities
- 2019 ERC Advanced Grant SYZYGY
- 2014 Ad Astra Prize for Excellence in Scientific Research
- 2005 Alfred P. Sloan Research Fellowship
