= World Camp (Girl Guides and Girl Scouts) =

- Country: various (list below)
- Date: 1924 onwards

There have been several World Camps held by the Girl Guides and Girl Scouts, first held in 1924. Organized by the World Association of Girl Guides and Girl Scouts, unlike World Scout Jamborees, World Camps are not named with an ordinal number, nor is there an attempt to hold them at regular intervals.

== Foxlease, 1924 ==
The first World Camp was held at Foxlease in 1924, from July 16 to 24, at the same time as the Third International Conference. Olave Baden-Powell and Olivia Burges formulated the idea in September 1923, during the latter's stay at Pax Hill. The original invitation was for six Guides and one Guider from each country where there were Guides. However, this was modified to accommodate those who were willing and able to send more. In total 1100 girls and women attended, 600 of which were from overseas. Forty countries were represented.

As Olave Baden-Powell wrote in 1923: "Some two years ago it was suggested that the Girl Guides Association should hold a big gathering similar in character to the great International Jamboree held by the Boy Scouts in 1920. This plan did not materialise owing to the undesirability of having great numbers of girls brought together en masse before the public eye" So instead of an event for the public, the proposal was that "Guides and Guiders from all parts of the world will like to meet together for a friendly gathering, to get to know one another and to see and to learn how the work of the great sisterhood is progressing in different lands."

== Camp Edith Macy, 1926 ==
The second World Camp was held at Camp Edith Macy in May 1926 in Briarcliff Manor, New York, United States, at the same time as the Fourth International Conference.

== Pax Ting, 1939 ==
Pax Ting, 1939

Pax Ting was the first World Camp held after the formation of the World Association of Girl Guides and Girl Scouts (WAGGGS) in 1930. The camp was held in Gödöllő, Hungary from 25 July to 7 August 1939, and attended by some 5,800 Girl Guides from around the world.

== Camp Barree, 26 June 1947 ==
Camp Barree in Pennsylvania, two week encampment.

== Centenary of the Founder's Birth, 1957 ==
Windsor, 1957

At the 15th World Conference of WAGGGS it was decided to mark the centenary of the birth of Lord Baden-Powell, the founder of Guiding, by holding a World Camp with four locations — Doe Lake, Ontario, Canada; Quezon City, Philippines; Lac de Conche, Switzerland; and Windsor Great Park, England, from January 19 to February 2, 1957.

Philippines, 1957

Doe Lake, 1957

== Foxlease, 1999 ==
Foxlease, 1999 Emblem

For the 75th anniversary of this first world camp, another was held at Foxlease. It had the motto Peace, Vision, Power. It was attended by over 4,000 participants, with every WAGGGS Region represented.

== See also ==
- Jamboree (Scouting)
