= Zoltán Farkas =

Zoltán Farkas may refer to:

- Zoltán Farkas (film editor) (1913–1980), Hungarian film editor and director, see List of Hungarian films 1901–1947
- Zoltán Farkas (politician) (born 1963), Hungarian politician
- Zoltán Farkas (footballer) (born 1989), Hungarian footballer
- Zoltán Farkas (footballer, born 1995), Hungarian footballer selected for the Hungarian U19 team
- Zoltán Farkas (musician), leader of Hungarian heavy metal band Ektomorf
- Zoltán Farkas (weightlifter) (born 1974), Hungarian weightlifter
