= Aladár Zichy =

Hungarian politician (1864–1937)

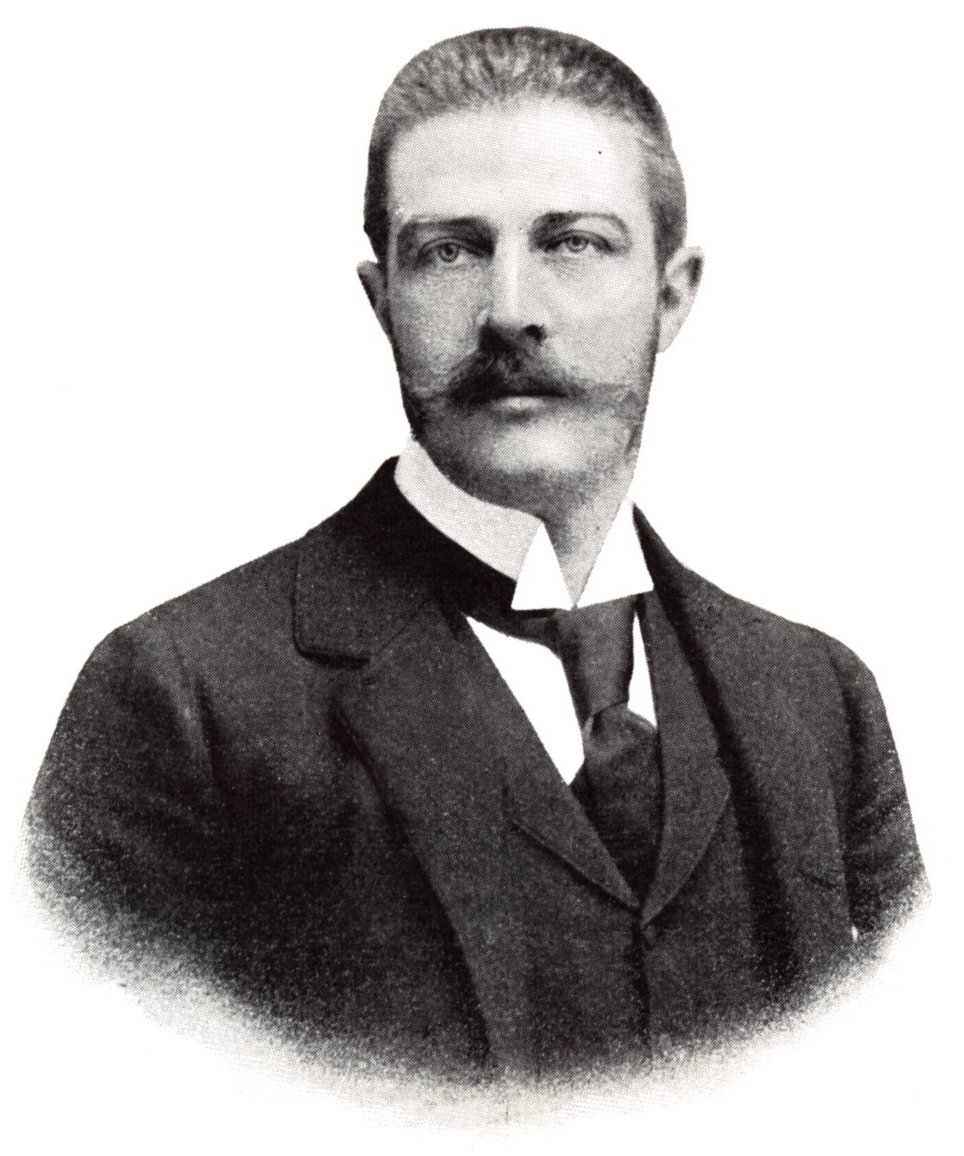

Minister besides the King of Hungary
- In office 8 April 1906 – 17 January 1910
- Preceded by: Géza Fejérváry
- Succeeded by: Károly Khuen-Héderváry
- In office 18 August 1917 – 31 October 1918
- Preceded by: Tivadar Batthyány
- Succeeded by: Tivadar Batthyány

Personal details
- Born: 4 September 1864 Nagyláng, Kingdom of Hungary
- Died: 16 November 1937 (aged 73) Budapest, Kingdom of Hungary
- Political party: Catholic People's Party
- Profession: politician

Count Aladár Zichy de Zich et Vásonkeő (4 September 1864 – 16 November 1937) was a Hungarian politician, who served as Minister besides the King twice: between 1906 and 1910 and during the end of the First World War. He was also Minister of Croatian Affairs in the third Wekerle cabinet.

== Biography ==
he was born in the ancient Roman Catholic Hungarian aristocratic family of the Counts Zichy de Zics et Vásonkeő. His father was Count Nándor Zichy (1829–1911) and his mother Countess Livia Zichy (1840–1913). His paternal grandparents were Count György Zichy (1805–1879) and Countess Lujza Pálffy de Erdőd (1804–1866). His maternal grandparents were Count Zichy Edmund (1811–1894), imperial and royal chamberlain and Princess Paulina Odescalchi (1810–1866). Count Aladár Zichy's first-degree cousin on the father's side, Count János Zichy (1868–1944) was a lawyer, imperial and royal chambers, a true inner secretary, a landowner, and the Minister of Culture of the Kingdom of Hungary.

Aladár Zichy was a member of the agrarian group led by Count Sándor Károlyi. Member of the House of Lords since 1893; twice as clerk of the main house at the Hungarian Parliament. Between 1896 and 1918 he was a representative member of Parliament for five election cycles with the program of the Catholic People's Party. Count Aladár Zichy conducted an active politic based in the development of the agricultural life and strong catholic convictions. He worked with several politicians of his time who shared his convictions but the closest was József Farkas de Boldogfa (1857–1951), who was also an elected Member of the Hungarian Parliament for the Catholic People's Party and founder member of it. In 1903 he was elected president of his party, holding the position until the dissolution of the People's Party (1918). At the beginning of the Hungarian domestic crisis of 1905–1906, he joined his party in the Co-operative Opposition, where he became a member of the steering committee due to his position as party chairman.

During the Hungarian Soviet Republic he participated in the anti-communist revolutionary movements on Szeged. From 1927 he was one of the leaders of the legitimist politicians. He directed the cooperative movement which supported by the landowners and the large farmers.

Political offices
Preceded by Géza Fejérváry	Minister besides the King; 1906–1910	Succeeded by Károly Khuen-Héderváry
Preceded by Imre Hideghéthy	Minister of Croatian Affairs; 1917	Succeeded by Károly Unkelhäusser
Preceded by Tivadar Batthyány	Minister besides the King; 1917–1918	Succeeded by Tivadar Batthyány
