= Réde =

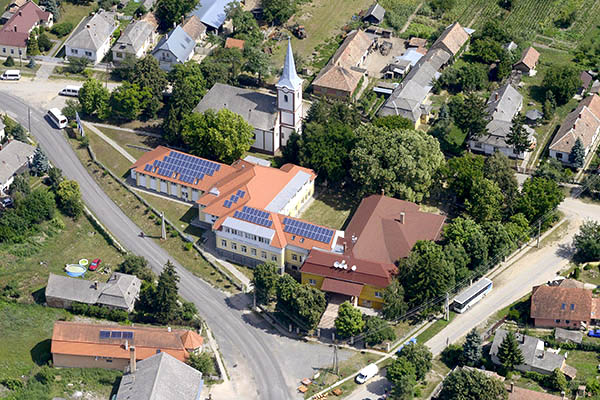

- Flag Coat of arms

- Location of Komárom-Esztergom county in Hungary

- Location of Réde
- Coordinates: 47.43058°N 17.91865°E
- Country: Hungary
- County: Komárom-Esztergom
- District: Kisbér

Area
  - Total: 45.89 km^{2} (17.72 sq mi)

Population (2004)
  - Total: 1,525
  - Density: 33.23/km^{2} (86.1/sq mi)
- Time zone: UTC+1 (CET)
  - Summer (DST): UTC+2 (CEST)
- Postal code: 2886
- Area code: 34

Réde is a village in Kisbér District of Komárom-Esztergom County in Hungary. It is located at the northern foothills of the Bakony Mountains, in the valley of the Cuhai-Bakonyér stream, surrounded by woodland. This geographically advantageous region has been inhabited since times predating the earliest records of Hungarian literacy.

Tourism in Réde is predicated on the nearby lakes, streams, and wildflower meadows, popular sights for hikers.

It was property of the Cseszneky, later of the Esterházy family.
