= 4th World Scout Jamboree =

- Location: Gödöllő
- Country: Hungary
- Date: 1933
- Attendance: 25,792 Scouts
Previous; 3rd World Scout Jamboree	Next; 5th World Scout Jamboree

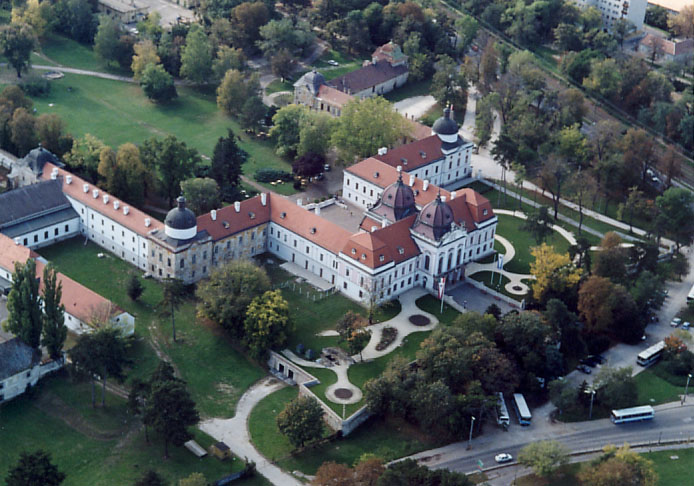
The Royal Palace of Gödöllő, Hungary, around which the 4th World Scout Jamboree was held.

The 4th World Scout Jamboree (Hungarian: 4. Cserkész Világdzsembori), a gathering of Boy Scouts from all over the world, was hosted by Hungary and held from 2 to 13 August 1933. It was attended by 25,792 Scouts, representing 46 different nations and additional territories. They encamped around the Royal Palace in the Royal Forest of Gödöllő, about 11 miles (18 kilometres) from the capital of Budapest.

== In attendance ==
It was the second-to-last Jamboree for the founder of Scouting, Robert Baden-Powell. Baden-Powell and Hungarian head of state, Regent Horthy, addressed the Scouts from the grandstand built to accommodate over 5000 guests during an opening ceremony at the rally ground. Regent Horthy told the Scouts,

Scouts! You have come to Hungary from all parts of the world to testify to the magnificent and uplifting powers of brotherhood represented by Scouting. The noble ties of friendship will, I believe, become even stronger among you through this Fourth World Jamboree. I am convinced that the Jamboree will do much toward the promotion of good-will and peaceful cooperation, for the general good of humanity. The Hungarian nation offers you with love these wood-girt fields for your camping. The Hungarian nation welcomes you and your leader, the founder of the World Scout Movement, Lord Baden Powell. Welcome to you all! I hope you will feel at home!

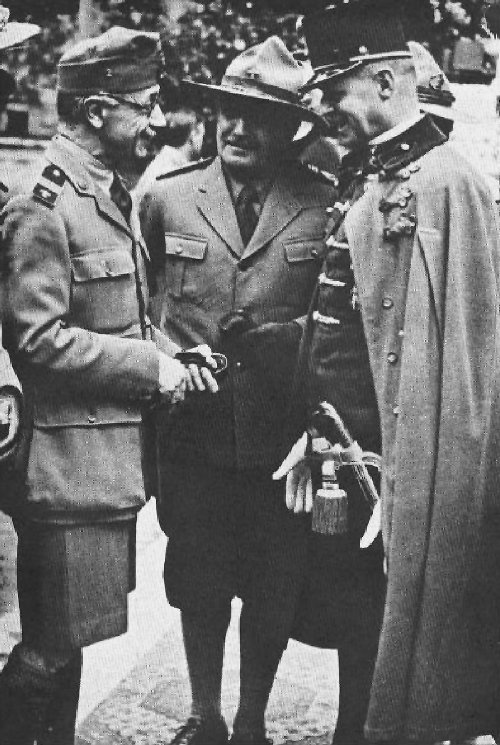
Jamboree Camp Chief Teleki Pál, past and future Prime Minister of Hungary; Papp Antal; and 4th World Jamboree General Camp Chief Kisbarnaki Ferenc Farkas at the 4th World Jamboree at Gödöllő, Hungary in 1933.

The Jamboree Camp Chief was the Chief Scout of Hungary, Count Teleki Pál, a member of the International Committee who had previously been and would later once again become Prime Minister of Hungary. The General Camp Manager was Vitez Kisbarnaki Ferenc Farkas, a general staff officer of the Hungarian Royal Army, who was later appointed the Chief Scout of Hungary upon Teleki Pál's death in 1941.

This event was notable as the first international gathering where Air Scouts were represented, including the famous pilots, László Almásy and Robert Kronfeld. A meeting of Skolta Esperanto Ligo took also place at the Jamboree.

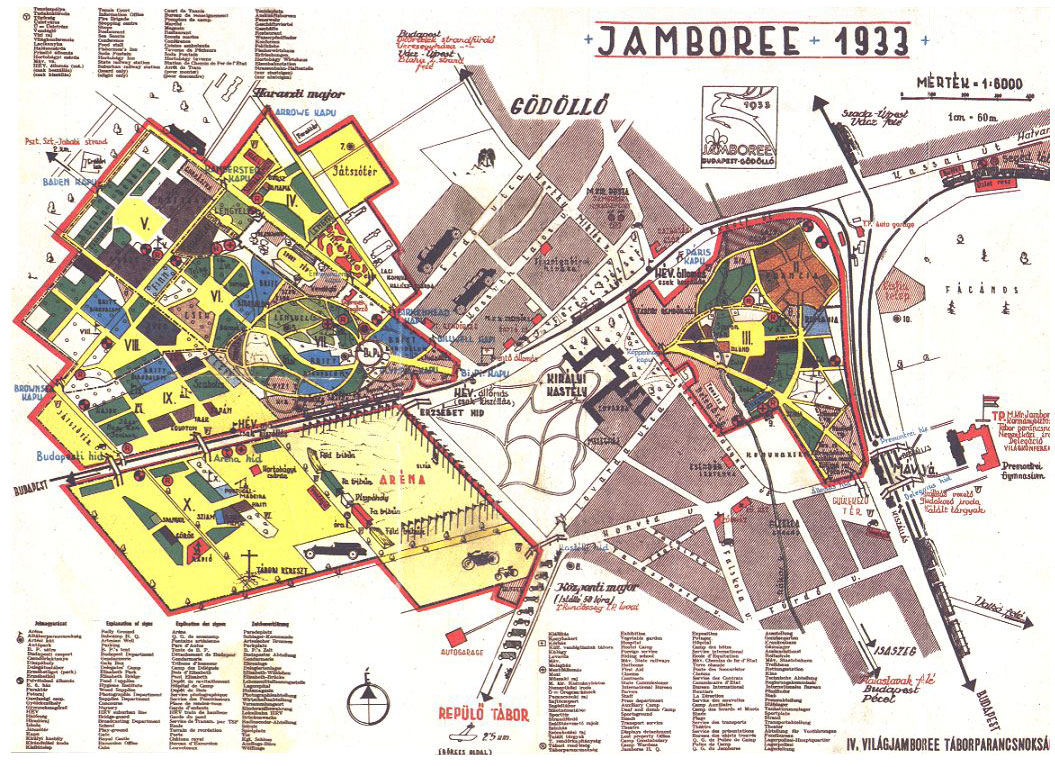
The official Hungarian language map and guide to the 4th World Jamboree.

Countries and territories with contingents of Scouts present included Hungary, Scotland, Wales, Northern Ireland, the Irish Free State, England, Jamaica, Trinidad, Switzerland, Sweden, Armenia, the Netherlands, Poland, Finland, Czechoslovakia, Estonia, Australia, New Zealand, British Guiana, Canada, Newfoundland, Ceylon, South Africa, Austria, Romania, Norway, Portugal, Siam, Spain, Haiti, Greece, France, Gibraltar, India, Philippines, United States, Bulgaria, Liechtenstein, Belgium, Syria, Denmark, Iceland, Egypt, Iran, Japan, Malta, Palestine, Rhodesia, the Duchy of Luxemburg, and Russian Emigrant Scouts. They lived in ten sub-camps. The overall encampment was serviced by its own post office, ambulance station, hospital, a steam railroad and station, an electric local streetcar line with four stations, radio service, 14 km water supply with 9 wells and an air-service.

The Jamboree daily paper, Magyar Cserkész, was printed in Hungarian, English, French and German, with contributions in other languages. Every foreign group at the Jamboree was assigned a "cousin"—a Hungarian Scout who spoke their language and served as translator and guide. They wore on their right arm a white band displaying two interlocked hands embroidered in red. Over their shirt pocket they wore an embroidered patch stating their language specialty, for example, Parle Français, Spricht Deutsch or Speaks English.

During the Jamboree, about 365,000 people including 100,000 from the nearby city of Gödöllő and the surrounding districts visited the Scouts from many nations, seeking "autograms"—autographs—and "change," or to trade clothing, patches, and more. The total expenditure was 1,660,000 Pengő (~ 332,000 US dollar), total income was 1,668,000 Pengő (~ 333,600 US dollar).

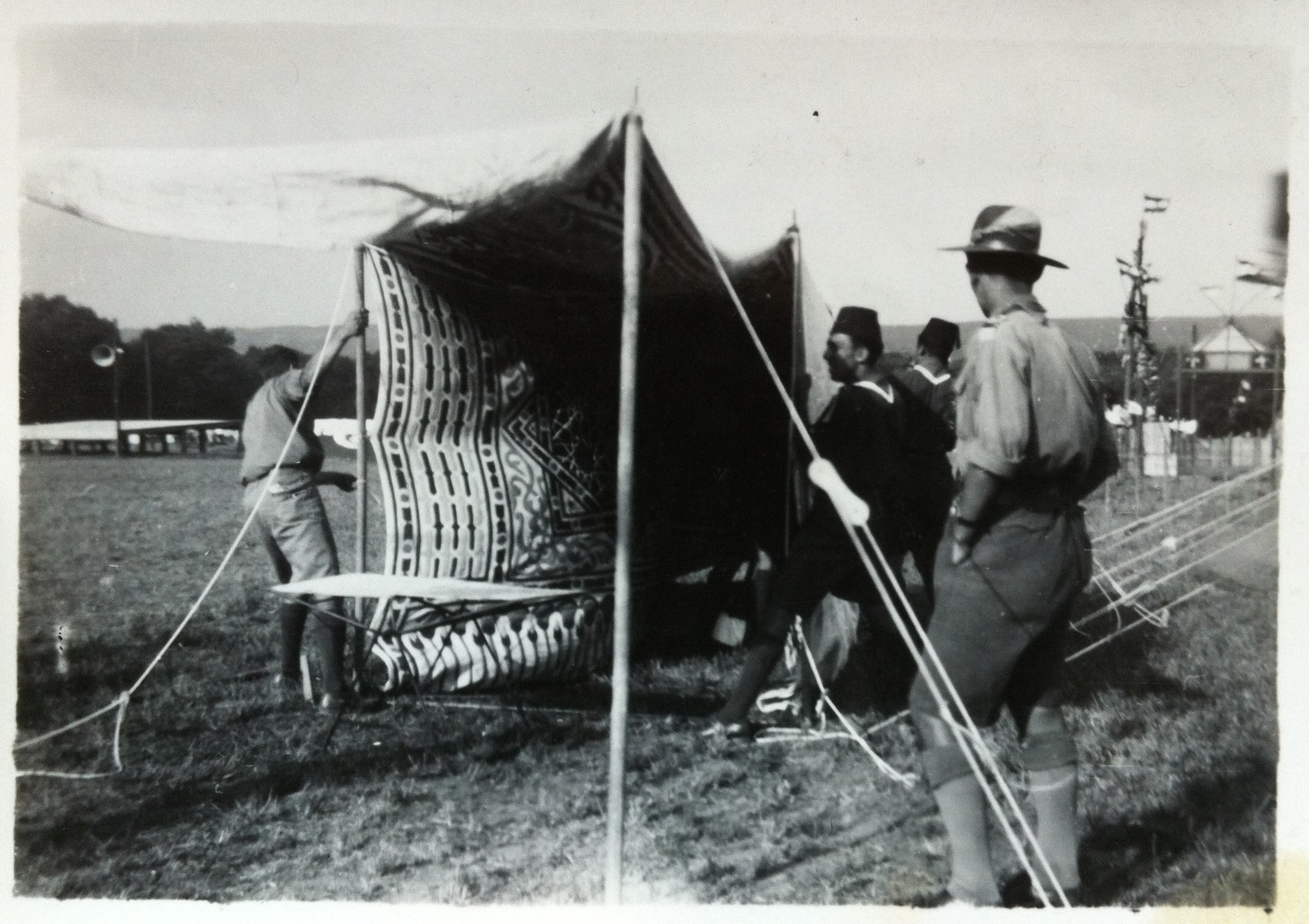
Egyptian Scouts raising a decorated khayamiya tent at the 4th World Scout Jamboree in Budapest, 1933

== Jamboree symbol: the White Stag ==
Souvenir book cover from the Fourth World Jamboree in 1933

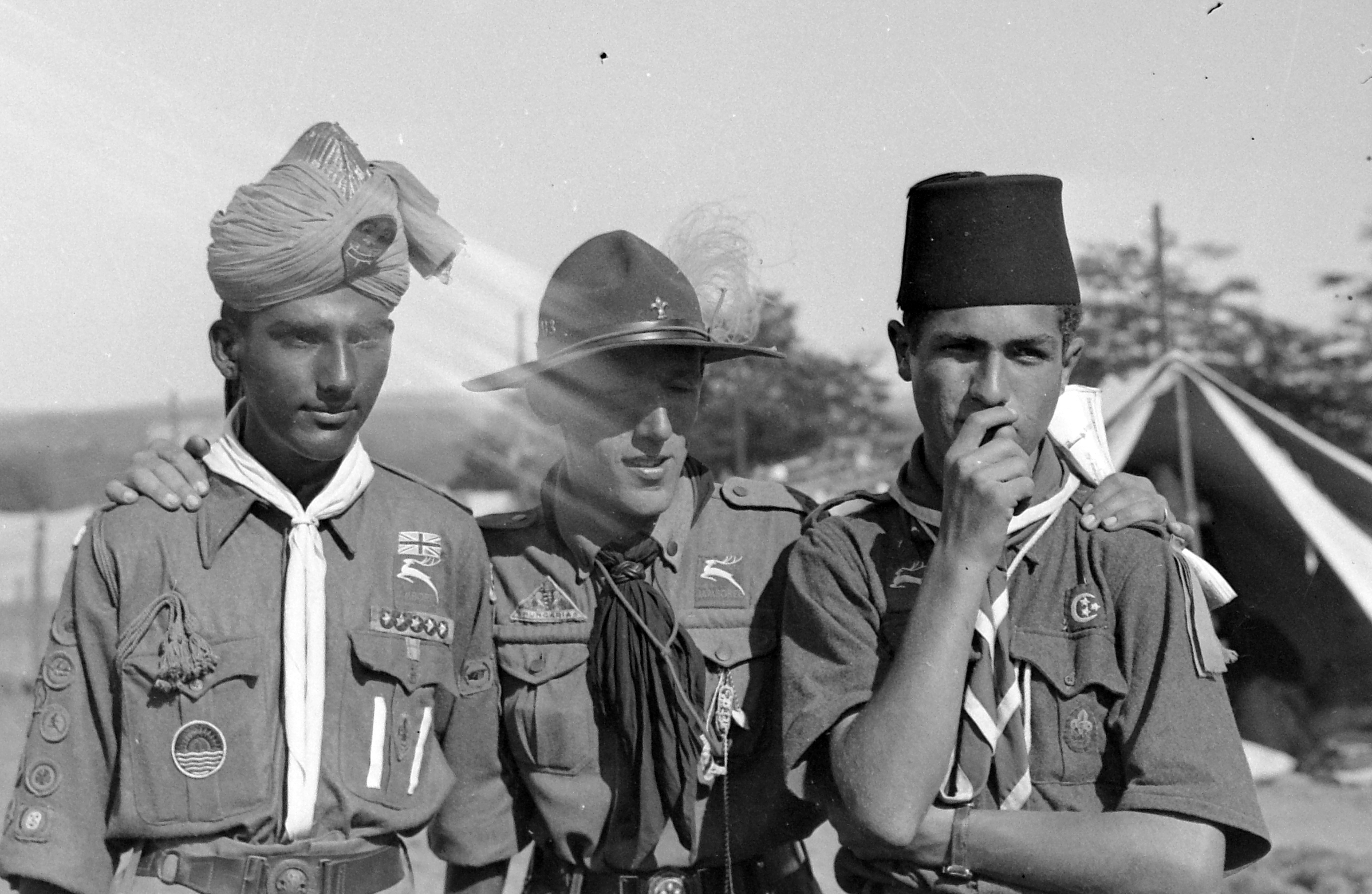
Scouts from India, Hungary and Turkey

The white stag of Hungarian mythology was the national symbol of Hungary and the official badge of the Jamboree. During the Jamboree, Scouts from the American contingent learned from their Hungarian "cousin" the meaning of the White Stag on their jamboree patch:

One day, many years ago, Hunor and Magor, the two sons of King Nimrod of the Orient, were out hunting with a number of their men. Suddenly, from a thicket, jumped the most beautiful deer they had ever seen. Immediately they started in pursuit. Over mountain sides, through valleys and forests, across rivers, they followed the magnificent animal, until, with darkness, they lost track of it. There was nothing for them to do except make camp right where they were and await the coming of morning.

When they awoke the next morning, a gorgeous sight greeted their eyes. In their wild ride, they had crossed the borders of their own country and had arrived in another of which they had never heard, a country richly endowed with good soil, beautiful forest, fruits, flowers, game and fish. Hunor and Magyar, decided that this was the land of their choice. They went back for their father's blessing and then returned with their wives to their new rich country.

Through the ages they prospered.

The descendants of Hunor became the Huns and of Magor, the Magyars, who now form the Hungarian nation.

Baden-Powell also referred to the symbol of the Hungarian people in his farewell address to the assembled Scouts:

Each one of you wears the badge of the White Stag of Hungary. I want you to treasure that badge when you go from here and to remember that, like the Golden Arrow, it also has its message and its meaning for you.

The Hungarian hunters of old pursued the miraculous Stag, not because they expected to kill it, but because it led them on in the joy of the chase to new trails and fresh adventures, and so to capture happiness. You may look on that White Stag as the pure spirit of Scouting, springing forward and upward, ever leading you onward and upward to leap over difficulties, to face new adventures in your active pursuit of the higher aims of Scouting—aims which bring you happiness.

These aims are to do your duty wholeheartedly to God, to your country, and to your fellow man by carrying out the Scout Law. In that way you will, each one of you, help to bring about God's kingdom upon earth—the reign of peace and goodwill.

Therefore, before leaving you, I ask you Scouts this question—Will you do your best to make friendship with others and peace in the world?

— From Baden-Powell's farewell speech

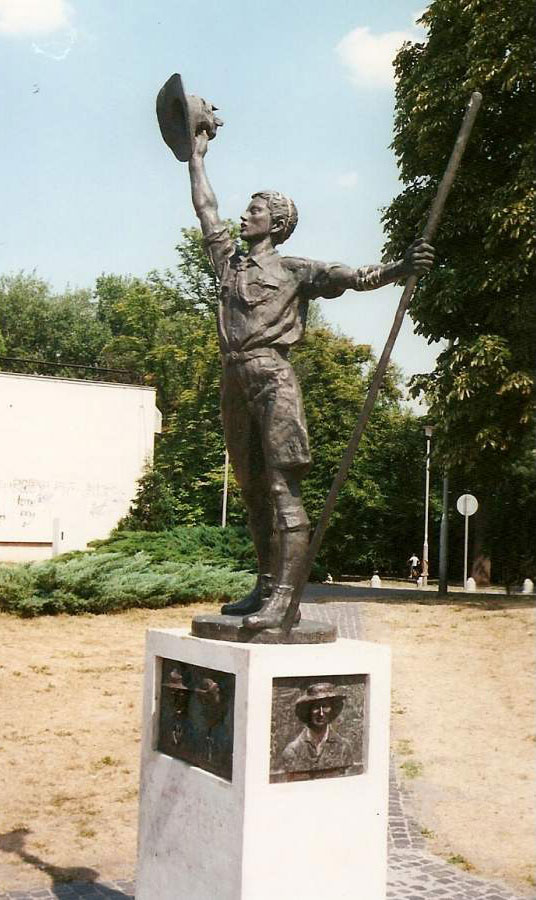
Statue of The Boy Scout erected in Gödöllõ, Hungary to commemorate the tenth anniversary of the 4th World Jamboree.

== See also ==
- World Scout Jamboree
