= Magyar Cserkészszövetség =

National Scouting organization in Hungary

- Hungarian Scout Association
- Location: Budapest
- Country: Hungary
- Founded: 1912
- Founders: Alajos Izsóf; Béla Megyercsy; Gyula Papp; Sándor Sík
- Membership: 12,485 (2019)
- Országos Elnök (National Chair): Peter Bedekovics
- Országos Ügyvezető Elnök (National Chief Executive): Domokos Horváth
- Országos Vezetőtiszt (National Commissioner): Armand Hegyi
- Affiliation: World Organization of the Scout Movement
- Website www.cserkesz.hu

Magyar Cserkészszövetség (Hungarian Scout Association), the primary national Scouting organization of Hungary, was founded in 1912, and became a member of the World Organization of the Scout Movement in 1922 and again after the rebirth of Scouting in the country in 1990. The coeducational Magyar Cserkészszövetség had 12,937 members in 2021.

== History ==
The first Scouting activity in Hungary was the raft trip on the river Vág in 1908. In 1909 Hungarian newspapers reported about Scouting in England, and some chapters of Scouting for Boys were published as well. István Kanitz bought Baden-Powell's book Scouting for Boys and started the first unofficial Scout troop with friends. The first official troops were founded in 1910 in schools and Christian youth associations. The first Scout troops in the dual monarchy, the troops at the Piarist High School, Calvinist Youth Club and Regnum Marianum, were founded in Budapest in 1910. In 1912 the Hungarian Scout Association (Magyar Cserkész Örszem Szövetség) was founded.

Important Scouting pioneers in Hungary were Sándor Sík, László Králik, Fritz de Molnar and Aladar de Szillassy. Fritz de Molnar brought a copy of Scouting for Boys from Sweden to Hungary and started Scouting in the Piarist College. Fritz de Molnar later became the Hungarian International Commissioner and Deputy Camp Chief. He was the man who won the heart of Count Pál Teleki for Scouting. Aladar de Szillassy, a teacher and member of the YMCA in Budapest, started a translation of Scouting for Boys and with the support of the National Secretary of the Hungarian YMCA, he started Scouting as part of the YMCA in Budapest. The Piarist Priest Sík Sándor finished the translation of Scouting for Boys.

Another influence supporting the beginning of Scouting in Hungary was the youth magazine Zaszlónk ("Our Flag"). Hungarian Scouts worked closely with Austrian Scouts. In 1917 a Scout exhibition in Vienna was organized by the Hungarian and Austrian Scouts. The Hungarian Scout Association was the Scout association for the Kingdom of Hungary (Transleithania), while the Österreichischer Pfadfinderbund was the association for Cisleithania.

=== Growth during early 20th century ===
During World War I Hungarian Scouts cared for the wounded. After World War I Scout groups were founded in many schools and the first student Scouting groups appeared. Troops were also founded in factories. In 1920, the first Hungarian Scouting magazine Cserkész ("Hungarian Scout") was published. In 1922 Teleki Pál, a prominent man was elected as Chief Scout and later served as Honorary Chief Scout. Air Scouts were introduced in Hungary and a National Scout Brass Band was founded. The first Woodbadge Course in Hungary was held in 1924. In 1926 a Sea Scout Training Center on the Danube and the Hárshegy Scout Training Center for Woodbadge trainings were opened.

In 1919 the first Girl Guide troop was founded within Magyar Cserkészszövetség and in 1926 Magyar Cserkészlány Szövetség was founded as a separate organization but there was still good cooperation between Boy Scouts and Girl Guides.

Hungarian Scouts continued their involvement internationally. When the World Scout Bureau was formed in 1922, Hungary was among its founders. Hungary not only helped found the World Association of Girl Guides and Girl Scouts (WAGGGS) in 1928, but also served as its original base, in Parád. Hungarian Scouts were active at the 1924 World Scout Jamboree. Hungarian Scouts placed third in the national competition, behind the Scouts of Britain and America.

=== Fourth World Jamboree ===
Hungary held its first National Jamboree in 1926 in Káposztásmegyer with 10.000 participants. The camp took place from July 9 to 23, 1926, and it was the only one between the two wars. In 1928 Baden-Powell visited Hungary. A few years later, Boy Scouts from all over the world gathered at the Fourth World Jamboree, held at Gödöllő, Hungary from August 2–13, 1933. Forty-six nations and territories were represented by 25,792 Scouts. They encamped around the Royal Palace in the Royal Forest of Gödöllő, about 11 miles from the capital of Budapest.

The badge of the 4th World Scout Jamboree depicted the white stag of Hungarian mythology, the national symbol of Hungary and the official badge of the Jamboree.

Former Prime Minister Teleki Pál served as camp chief and Vitez Kisbarnaki Ferenc Farkas, a general staff officer of the Hungarian Royal Army, served as the General Camp Manager. The 4th World Jamboree was the first time there was a subcamp for Scouts taking part in aviation.

Scouting in Hungary included both a youth movement and an organization for young men 19–21 years old.

=== World War II ===
During World War II, Hungarian Scouts carried out many important roles, acting as messengers and other essential duties. Pál Teleki was called on once again to lead the nation as Prime Minister and Chief Scout of Hungary. Betrayed in his efforts to keep Hungary out of World War II, he committed suicide on April 3, 1941. He was succeeded as Chief Scout by General Kisbarnaki Ferenc Farkas, Commander of Royal Ludvokia Akademia. General Farkas remained Chief Scout of the Hungarian Scouts in Exile.

Under political pressure from the extreme right, the Hungarian Scouting movement became more militaristic and nationalistic between 1941 and 1945. Despite the war, the Hungarian national Scout leadership was able until the end of 1943 to maintain contact with the Boy Scouts International Bureau, the Polish Scout Headquarters in exile, and with Prince Gustav Adolf of Sweden, Chief Scout of Sweden and member of the World Scout Committee. Before the end of World War II, the national Hungarian Scouts were ordered to merge with the extremist right-leaning youth organization Hungarista Örszem, but it was never really executed.

=== Post World War II ===
In 1947 the Hungarian Scouts took part in the 6th World Scout Jamboree in France. In 1945, after World War II, the Külföldi Magyar Cserkészszövetség (Hungarian Scout Association in Exteris), was first named the Teleki Pál Scout Association. It was soon renamed as the Hungarian Scout Association, and it became active in the displaced persons camps in Germany and Austria. Béla H. Bánáthy was during World War II the voluntary national director for youth leadership development and a member of the National Council of the Hungarian Scout Association. He was instrumental in contacting the World Scouting Movement and organized Scouting in his camp southeast of Innsbruck, Austria, inside the French occupation zone. Zoltai Gogins organized Hungarian Scouting in the Feffernitz displaced persons camps near Graz in the British occupation zone. The Hungarian Scout Association in Exteris soon became active around the world. The Magyar Cserkészszövetség in Exile preserved the traditions of Hungarian Scouting in exile and held contact with other Scout associations.

In 1948, Scouting was officially abolished in Hungary by the Communist regime, but it remained nascent underground in a situation similar to that in neighboring Czechoslovakia. Former Scouts worked in secret to keep "the spirit of Scouting" alive during this time even at risk of imprisonment. During the Hungarian Revolution of 1956 there was a short time were Hungarian Scouts were active in public again. After the end of the Hungarian Revolution, Scout groups were founded in refugee camps and Austrian cities. In 1957 there were 11 groups with 450 Scouts registered within Pfadfinder Österreichs. Hungarian Scouts took part in the JIM 1957 as members of the Austrian contingent and in the sub camp of the Council of Scout associations in Exile.

=== Rebirth of Scouting ===
In 1989, Scouting was again legalized, and during that year Scouting groups appeared as though spontaneously, surprising many by how quickly it returned. In January 1989 Magyar Cserkészszövetség was the first official registered and recognized association under the Law on Associations, which became effective on January 24. Also in January 1989 a second Scout association Magyar Cserkészcsapatok Svövestege (Hungarian Scout Groups Association) was founded. Both formed the Magyar Cserészet Tanácsa (Council of Hungarian Scouting) with 10,300 members in 1990. Because of internal problems the Council of Hungarian Scouting disbanded and Magyar Cserkészszövetség was registered as National Scout Organisation of Hungary in 1992 by the World Scout Bureau. In June 1992 the Hungarian Scout Association had 462 groups with 25.000 members in Hungary. That same year the original seal was restored to the Hungarian Scout Association by the Külföldi Magyar Cserkészszövetség. In 1990, Hungary and Czechoslovakia were the first of the Eastern European nations to return to membership in the World Organization of Scout Movement.

In 1992, Dr. Béla H. Bánáthy, a long-standing member of the Hungarian Scout Association Abroad (Külföldi Magyar Cserkészszövetség), traveled from the Monterey, California in the United States to Hungary following its renewed freedom. Bánáthy had attended the 4th World Scout Jamboree held at Gödöllő in 1933. He later became personal friends with General Kisbarnaki Ferenc Farkas, Chief Scout of Hungary, and was also Director of Leadership Development at the Royal Ludovika Akademia for the Hungarian Boy Scout Association (Magyar Cserkészszövetség) during World War II. Bánáthy helped restart the Hungarian Scout Association.

In 1993 an international Camp at Gödöllő took place commemorating the 4th World Scout Jamboree. There was a sub camp for members of International Fellowship of Former Scouts and Guides. Betty Clay, Baden-Powell's daughter, took part in this international Camp.

=== Commemorative statue replaced ===
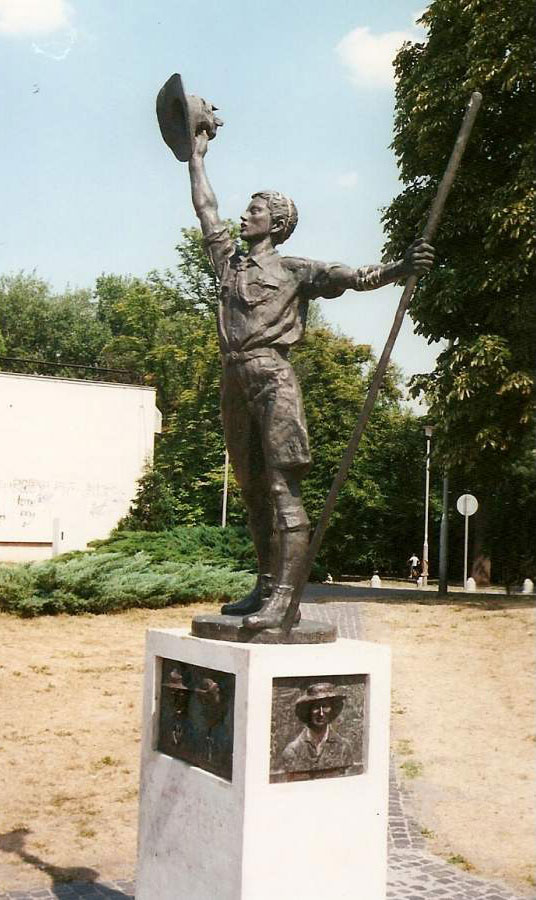
Statue of The Boy Scout erected in Gödöllő, Hungary to commemorate the tenth anniversary of the 1933 World Jamboree

In 1994, after democracy and Scouting was reestablished in Hungary, the community around Gödöllő moved to locate and re-erect a statue by Lőrinc Siklódi commemorating the 1933 World Jamboree. In 1943, on the tenth anniversary of the Jamboree, a statue of a Boy Scout was erected across from the Guard Barracks in Royal Forest of Gödöllő, Hungary. When Communist forces liberated the country from Nazi Germany, the original statue by sculptor Lőrinc Siklódi was removed as the government moved to suppress Scouting.

After a long search, the original statue could not be found, and a committee was established with the purpose of erecting a new statue. They decided to enlarge Zsigmond Kisfaludi Strobl's 50 inches (130 cm) statuette entitled The Boy Scout. A student of Kisfaludi Strobl, István Pál, was chosen to complete the work. The new statue of a Boy Scout standing on the original pedestal is unveiled on April 23, 1994, commemorating yet again the 1933 World Jamboree.

== Modern program ==
In 1991, 20 Scouts of the Magyar Cserkészszövetség participated in the World Jamboree in Korea; and in 1995, 70 Scouts represented Hungarian Scouting in the World Jamboree in the Netherlands. 90 Scouts represented Hungarian Scouting in the 19th World Jamboree and 565 Scouts, including 50 Hungarian Scouts from Transylvania, Slovakia, Ukraine, Serbia, Canada and the United States of America, represented Hungarian Scouting in the 21st World Scout Jamboree in England. At the end of 2004, there were 7,198 registered members in all sections. At the end of 2008, there were 6,758 registered members in all sections.

With the growth of Scouting in Hungary, changes to the organization include girl membership, who have their own patrols, and the expansion from towns into villages, allowing otherwise isolated children to participate. Prior to World War II, Magyar Cserkészszövetség groups were primarily hosted by schools, and today are more likely to be connected to a church parish. During the Communist period, Magyar Cserkészszövetség lost considerable property, but today owns two campsites near Budapest. These are the Pál Sztrilich Scout Park Hungarian: Sztrilich Pál Cserkészpark and the Csobánka Central European Scout Park(Hungarian: Csobánkai Közép-európai Cserkészpark).

The program is currently organized into three age groups:

- Cub Scouts-ages 6–11 years
- Scouts-ages 11–16 years
- Rovers-ages 16–21 years

The Scout Motto is Légy Résen translating as Be Prepared. The noun for a single Scout in Hungarian is Cserkész. The membership badge of Magyar Cserkészszövetség features the Crown of Saint Stephen. There is also a Sea Scout programme.

The Hungarian Scout Association is among other organizations member of the Ecumenical Council of Churches in Hungary. The Catholic Committee of the Hungarian Scout Association is a full member of the International Catholic Conference of Scouting (ICCS).

== Hungarian Scouting abroad ==
A number of associations offers Scouting to people of Hungarian descent living outside of Hungary. They form several groups:

- For Hungarian Scouts internationally, the Külföldi Magyar Cserkészszövetség, or Hungarian Scout Association in Exteris serves them.
- For Hungarian Scouts in neighboring countries, these local associations serve the Hungarian minority Scouts:
  - Croatia: Horvátországi Magyarok Zrínyi Miklós Cserkészcsapata (HoMZMCSCS), affiliated with Savez izviđača Hrvatske
  - Romania: Romániai Magyar Cserkészszövetség (RMCSSZ)
  - Serbia: Vajdasági Magyar Cserkészszövetség (VMCSSZ)
  - Slovakia: Szlovákiai Magyar Cserkészszövetség (SZMCS)
  - Ukraine: Kárpátaljai Magyar Cserkészszövetség (KáMCSSZ)

The internationally recognised Hungarian associations, the Scouts in Exteris and the minority associations are members of the International Forum of Hungarian Scouting.

== Notable Scouts ==
- László Almásy, pilot, researcher of the Sahara Desert, title character of The English Patient
- Béla H. Bánáthy, founder of the White Stag youth leadership development program, an influential professor of systems theory, and an author
- Ferenc Csik, swimmer, gold medal winner of 1936 Summer Olympics
- Ferenc Mádl, President of Hungary (2000–2005)
- Pál Maléter, military leader of the 1956 Hungarian Revolution
- Ernő Rubik, flight engineer, father of Ernő Rubik jr., inventor of the Rubik's Cube
- Pál Teleki, scientist, prime minister of Hungary (1920–1921) and (1939–1941)

== See also ==
- Magyar Cserkészlány Szövetség
- László Nagy
