= Francisco =

- Pronunciation: Spanish: [fɾanˈθisko] (Spain) or [fɾanˈsisko] (Latin America); Brazilian Portuguese: [fɾɐ̃ˈsisku] Portuguese pronunciation: [fɾɐ̃ˈsiʃku]
- Gender: Male

Other gender
- Feminine: Francisca

Origin
- Meaning: "Free Man" Latin

Other names
- Nicknames: Chico, Paco, Pancho, Paquito, Patxi, Frank, Frankie
- Related names: Franciscus, Francis, Francesco, François, Françoise, Franciszek, Francesc, Ferenc, Frank, Franco, Franz, Frans, Franklin

Francisco is the Spanish and Portuguese form of the masculine given name Franciscus.

== Nicknames ==
In Spanish, people with the name Francisco are sometimes nicknamed "Paco". San Francisco de Asís was known as Pater Communitatis (father of the community) when he founded the Franciscan order, and "Paco" is a short form of Pater Communitatis.

In areas of Spain where Basque is spoken, "Patxi" is the most common nickname; in the Catalan areas, "Cesc" (short for Francesc) is often used. In Spanish Latin America and in the Philippines, people with the name Francisco are frequently called "Pancho". "Kiko"and "Cisco" is also used as a nickname, and "Chicho" is another possibility.

In Portuguese, people named Francisco are commonly nicknamed "Chico" (shíco).

== People with the given name ==
- Francisco "Paco" Estrada III, American musician
- Francisco (slave) (died 1876), black slave who killed his masters and the last person executed by Brazil
- Francisco Acebal (1866–1933), Spanish writer and author
- Francisco Alves Mendes Filho Cena (1944–1988), known as Chico Mendes, Brazilian rubber tapper, unionist and environmental activist
- Francisco Anysio de Oliveira Paula Filho (1966–1997), known as Chico Anysio, Brazilian actor, comedian, writer and composer
- Francisco Ayala (disambiguation), several people
- Francisco Bernabé (born 1970), Spanish politician
- Francisco de Borbón y Escasany, 5th Duke of Seville (1943–2025), Spanish aristocrat
- Francisco de Borbón von Hardenberg (born 1979), Spanish aristocrat
- Francisco Buarque de Hollanda, popularly known as Chico Buarque, Brazilian singer, guitarist, composer, dramatist, writer and poet
- Francisco Caamaño Domínguez (born 1963), Spanish politician
- Francisco Cabrera (cyclist), Chilean track and road cyclist
- Francisco Caffaro (born 2000), Argentine basketballer
- Francisco Camino Sánchez (1940–2024), Spanish bullfighter
- Francisco Carreón, Filipino revolutionary who was the former vice president of the short-lived Tagalog Republic that existed from 1902–1906
- Francisco Cerúndolo (born 1998), Argentine tennis player
- Francisco Checa (born 1940), Panamanian basketball player
- Francisco Comesaña (born 2000), Argentine tennis player
- Francisco Dagohoy, Filipino who started a rebellion against Spain that endured for 85 years
- Francisco de Assis França, known as Chico Science, Brazilian singer and composer and one of the founders of the Mangue Beat cultural movement
- Francisco de Borja Echeverría (1848–1904), Chilean diplomat and politician
- Francisco de Jesus, Brazilian boxer
- Francisco de Orellana (1511–1546), Spanish explorer and conquistador
- Francisco de Paula Cândido (1910–2002), known as Chico Xavier, medium in Brazil's spiritism movement
- Francisco Denis, Venezuelan actor and director
- Francisco Doratioto (born 1956), Brazilian historian
- Francisco Fernandes (1940–1980), Indian actor and singer
- Francisco Flores (disambiguation), several people
- Francisco Fonseca, Mexican football (soccer) player
- Francisco Franco, Spanish politician and Dictator (1892–1975)
- Francisco François, Mauritian politician
- Francisco García, Dominican basketball player
- Francisco Glicério (1846–1916), Brazilian lawyer, politician, professor, and journalist
- Francisco González Gómez (1918–1990), Spanish caricaturist, painter and sculptor who used the pseudonym of Francisco
- Francisco Horta (born 1993), Mexican boxer
- Francisco Hudson (1826–1859), Chilean navy officer and hydrographer
- Francisco I. Madero (1873–1913) 37th president of Mexico that started the Mexican Revolution
- Francisco Infante-Arana (born 1943), Russian painter
- Francisco J. Ayala (1934–2023), Spanish-American biologist and philosopher
- Francisco Javier Duarte, Laser physicist
- Francisco Jiménez (born 1943), Mexican-American author
- Francisco Lachowski, Brazilian fashion model
- Francisco Lachowski, Brazilian model
- Francisco Leal (1968-) Spanish sprint canoer
- Francisco Liaño, Spanish footballer
- Francisco Lindor, MLB shortstop
- Francisco Liriano, MLB starting pitcher
- Francisco Lobos, Chilean politician
- Francisco Macías Nguema, later Africanized his name to Masie Nguema Biyogo Ñegue Ndong, former dictator of Equatorial Guinea
- Francisco Manuel de las Heras y Borrero (1951–2013), Spanish historian
- Francisco Marto, Fatima visionary
- Francisco Montané (1878 – ?), Chilean public official, insurance executive, agriculturist and politician
- Francisco Morales, Argentine judoka
- Francisco Olivencia (1934–2019), Spanish lawyer and politician
- Francisco Ortiz (born 1986), Spanish actor
- Francisco Pi y Margall (1824–1901), Spanish politician, 2nd President of the First Spanish Republic in 1873.
- Francisco Pizarro, Spanish conquistador
- Francisco Quevedo, Spanish poet
- Francisco Rivera Pérez (1948–1984), Spanish bullfighter
- Francisco Rodríguez (baseball, born 1982), (K-Rod) MLB closing pitcher
- Francisco Rodríguez Adrados (1922–2020), Spanish hellenist
- Francisco Romero López (born 1933), Spanish bullfighter
- Francisco Rotllán, Mexican football (soccer) player
- Francisco Rubio Llorente (1930–2016), Spanish jurist
- Francisco Sanjosé (1952–2026), Spanish footballer
- Francisco Santamaría Mirones (born 1936), known as Paco Santamaría, Spanish international footballer
- Francisco Santos (disambiguation), several people
- Francisco Sardinha, Indian politician, former Chief Minister of Goa and member of the Indian National Congress
- Francisco Toscano (born 1949), Spanish politician
- Francisco Vásquez de Coronado, Spanish conquistador
- Francisco Velázquez, former Argentine roller hockey player
- Francisco Victoria, Mexican independence fighter
- Francisco Vidal (Chilean politician), Chilean politician
- Francisco Vidal (disambiguation), several people
- Francisco X. Camplís (born 1934), American Chicano visual artist and filmmaker
- Pope Francis (1936–2025) is rendered in the Spanish, Portuguese and Filipino languages as Papa Francisco
- Weerahannadige Francisco Fernando (1812–1848), Sri Lankan Sinhala independence revolutionary

== As a surname ==
Refer to Francisco (surname)

- Aaron Francisco, American football player
- Antônio Francisco (1923–1997), better known as Nininho, Brazilian football player
- Botong Francisco (1912–1969), Filipino painter
- Candela Francisco, Argentinian chess player
- Frank Francisco, Dominican professional baseball pitcher
- Jason Francisco, Filipino actor and comedian
- João Francisco, Brazilian football player
- Manuel Francisco, South African professional snooker player
- Noel Francisco, American attorney, Solicitor General of the United States (2017–2020)
- Osmar Francisco, Brazilian footballer
- Pablo Francisco, American stand-up comedian
- Peter Francisco (1760–1831), American Revolutionary War soldier
- Peter Francisco (snooker player), South African professional snooker player
- San Francisco, Giovanni di Pietro di Bernardone, Italian mystic
- Sergio Francisco (born 1979), Spanish footballer
- Silvino Francisco (1946–2024), South African professional snooker player

== Fictional characters ==
- Abbot Francisco, a character in the video game, Dragon Quest VIII
- Francisco d'Anconia, a character in Ayn Rand's novel Atlas Shrugged
- Francisco Ramon, a superhero in the DC Comics (sometimes called Paco Ramon)
- Francisco Scaramanga, the main antagonist of Ian Fleming's last novel, The Man with the Golden Gun (1964) and the subsequent film adaption from 1974
- Judge Francisco, supporting character in the Judge Dredd comic strip
