= Francisco (disambiguation) =

Francisco is a given name.

Francisco may also refer to:

- Francisco, Indiana, US, a town
- Francisco (CTA station), a railway station in Chicago, Illinois, US
- Francisco (moon), a satellite of Uranus
- Francisco (slave) (died 1876), the last person executed by Brazil
- Typhoon Francisco
- Francisco (surname), a surname

== See also ==
- France (disambiguation)
- Frances (disambiguation)
- Francesco
- Francis (disambiguation)
- San Francisco (disambiguation)
  - San Francisco, California, the fourth-most populous city in the state of California
- São Francisco (disambiguation)
