= Paco =

Paco is a Spanish nickname for Francisco. According to folk etymology, the nickname has its origins in Saint Francis of Assisi, who was the father of the Franciscan order; his name was written in Latin by the order as pater communitatis (father of the community); hence "Paco" was supposedly obtained by taking the first syllable of each word.

People with the nickname Paco include:

- Paco Alcácer (born 1993), Spanish footballer
- Paco Arespacochaga (born 1971), Portuguese singer
- Paco Cabanes Pastor (1954–2021), Valencian pilota player
- Paco Calderón (born 1959), Mexican political cartoonist
- Paco Camino (1940–2024), Spanish bullfighter
- Paco Craig (American football) (born 1965), American football player
- Paco Craig (English footballer) (born 1992), English footballer
- Paco de Lucía (1947–2014), Spanish flamenco guitarist and composer
- Paco Decina (born 1955), Italian choreographer
- Francisco Estévez (born 1945), Spanish composer
- Paco Estrada (born 1980), American musician
- Francisco Gento (born 1933), Spanish footballer
- Paco Godia (1921–1990), Spanish racing driver
- Paco González (journalist) (born 1966), Spanish sport journalist
- Paco Herrera (born 1953), Spanish footballer
- Paco Ibáñez (born 1934), Spanish singer
- Paco Jamandreu (1925–1995), Argentine fashion designer and actor
- Paco Jémez (born 1970), Spanish footballer
- Paco León (born 1974), Spanish actor
- Francisco Llorente Gento (born 1965), Spanish retired footballer
- Paco López (footballer) (born 1967), Spanish football manager and former player
- Francisco Marhuenda (born 1961), Spanish journalist, professor and former politician
- Paco Moncayo (born 1940), mayor of Quito, Ecuador
- Paco Peña (born 1942), Spanish flamenco guitarist
- Paco Rabanne (1934–2023), Spanish fashion designer
- Paco Rodriguez (born 1991), American baseball player
- Pape Demba "Paco" Samb, Senegalese-American griot
- Paco Santamaría (born 1936), Spanish international footballer
- Paco Stanley (1942–1999), Mexican television entertainer and politician
- Paco Ignacio Taibo I (1924–2008), Spanish/Mexican writer and journalist
- Paco Ignacio Taibo II (born 1949), Spanish/Mexican writer, academic and politician
- Paco Tous (born 1964), Spanish actor

== See also ==
- Pancho
- Patxi
