= Capital punishment in Brazil =

Capital punishment is a long unused form of punishment in Brazil. The last recorded instance of a death penalty convict being executed in the country was in 1876. Although virtually abolished, it is still legal during wartime, according to the Article 5, XLVII, "a", of the Federal Constitution. Brazil is the most populous country in the world that does not retain the death penalty in practice (Mexico is the most populous to have abolished it entirely). It is also one of seven countries to have abolished capital punishment for ordinary crimes only.

== History ==
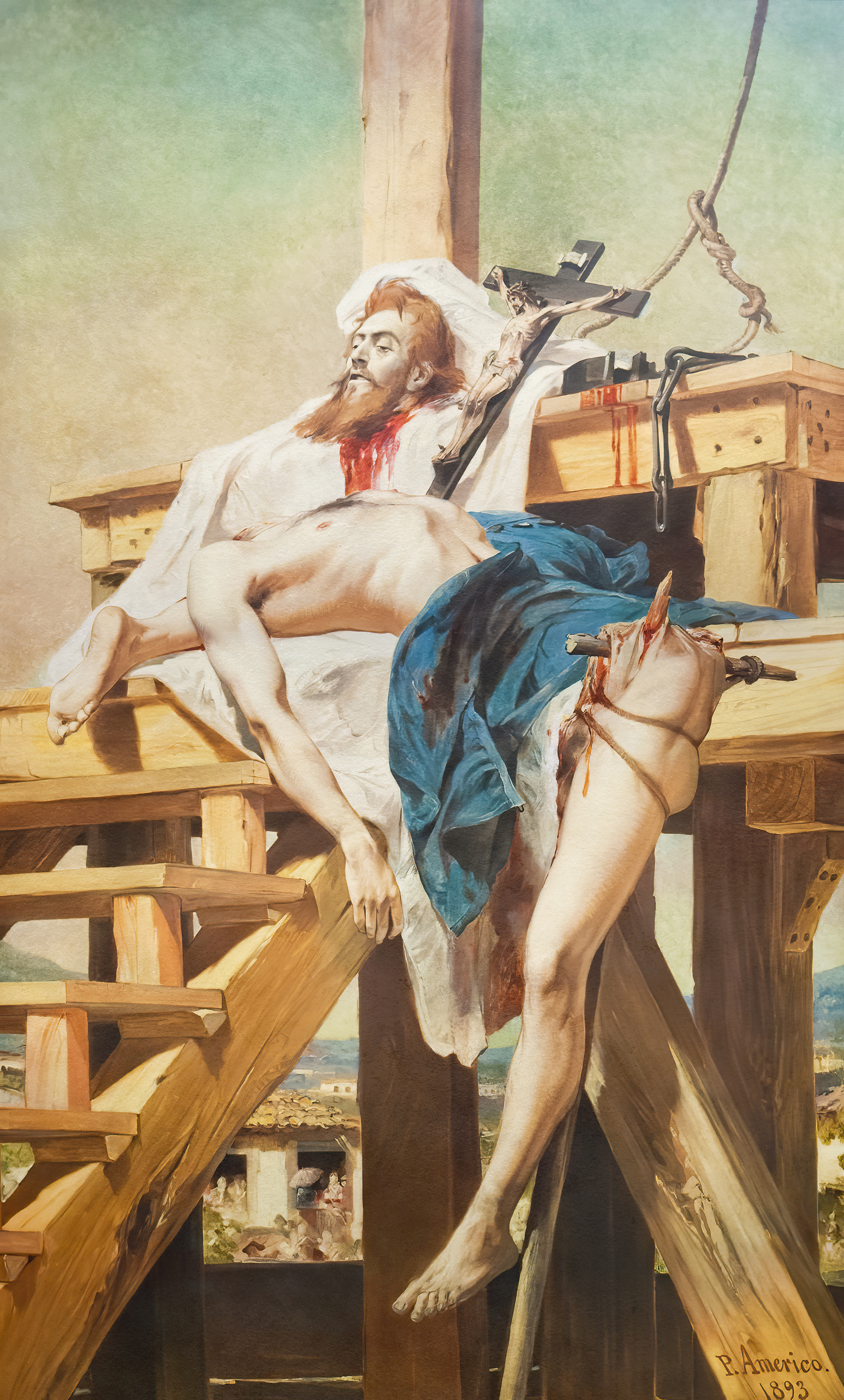
National hero Tiradentes was quartered by Portuguese Empire forces on April 21, 1792 for his participation in the Inconfidência Mineira independence movement.

The last execution carried out in Brazil was that of Francisco, an enslaved man, in Pilar, Alagoas on April 28, 1876. The last execution of a free man was, according to official records, of José Pereira de Sousa, in Santa Luzia, Goiás. He was hanged on October 30, 1861. The last execution of a woman, as far as can be established, was Peregrina, one of slaves of Rosa Cassange in Sabará, MG, executed by hanging on April 14, 1858 (some sources also quote April 13, 1858), by the Province of Minas Gerais. The executioner was the slave Fortunato José. It was later discovered that Peregrina was innocent.

Until the final years of the Brazilian Empire, defendants were still condemned to death despite the fact that Emperor Pedro II of Brazil commuted all death sentences passed after 1876, for both free men and slaves. However, the death sentence was only fully abolished for common crimes after the proclamation of the Republic in 1889. It was not abolished for certain military offenses in wartime.

The 1937 Constitution, which ruled the country during Getúlio Vargas' Estado Novo dictatorship, made it possible for the Justice to sentence prisoners to death for crimes beyond military offenses in wartime. According to popular belief, integralist writer Gerardo Mello Mourão would have been sentenced to death in 1942 under the accusation of committing espionage for the Axis powers. As he later said in an interview, he was sentenced to life imprisonment during that time. He claims to have "never been sentenced to death as the pundits of history and bad faith insinuate". As a matter of fact, there are no records of an execution taking place during the period of time in which this Constitution ruled, which lasted until 1946.

From 1969 to 1978, during the military dictatorship, execution once again became available as a form of punishment for political crimes which resulted in death. As such, Teodomiro Romeiro dos Santos, a militant of the Brazilian Revolutionary Communist Party, was sentenced to death under the accusation of shooting an Air Force sergeant, who died, and a Federal Police officer, who was injured. Santos, now a retired judge, is recognized as the only person sentenced to death during the Republican history of Brazil. His sentence was commuted to life imprisonment in 1971. There are no official records of executions taking place during the military rule. However, the regime was responsible for the extrajudicial killing of at least 300 of its opponents.

Capital punishment for all non-military offences was abolished in Brazil by the 1988 Constitution. Currently, the death penalty may be applicable in Brazil only for military offenses such as treason, murder, genocide, crimes against humanity, war crimes, and terrorism during wartime. The sole method prescribed by law is death by firing squad. The Military Penal Code advises that this penalty should be sentenced only in extreme cases, and that the president may grant a pardon for the convicted officer. However, Brazil has not engaged in any major armed conflict since the end of World War II. Brazil is the only Portuguese-speaking country that still maintains the death penalty for some offenses.

== Law ==
The Brazilian Constitution of 1988 expressly prohibits the usage of capital punishment by the penal justice system. However, death penalty may be applicable, according to international law, in case of a declared war, under the terms of Article 84, paragraph 19, of the Constitution. It also prohibits, in the same article that refers to the death penalty, the usage of life sentences, making Brazil one of the few countries which has abolished both life imprisonment and death penalty. According to the Brazilian Penal Code, a citizen cannot spend more than 40 continuous years incarcerated.

Brazil is a State Party to the Protocol of the American Convention on Human Rights to Abolish the Death Penalty, which was ratified on August 13, 1996.

According to international law, the "application of the death penalty in time of war pursuant to a conviction for a serious crime of a military nature committed during wartime" is admissible. Article 2, paragraph 1 of the United Nations Second Optional Protocol to the International Covenant on Civil and Political Rights Aiming at the Abolition of the Death Penalty, allows members to make a reservation in these terms, at the time of ratification or accession to the Protocol.

== Opinion polls ==
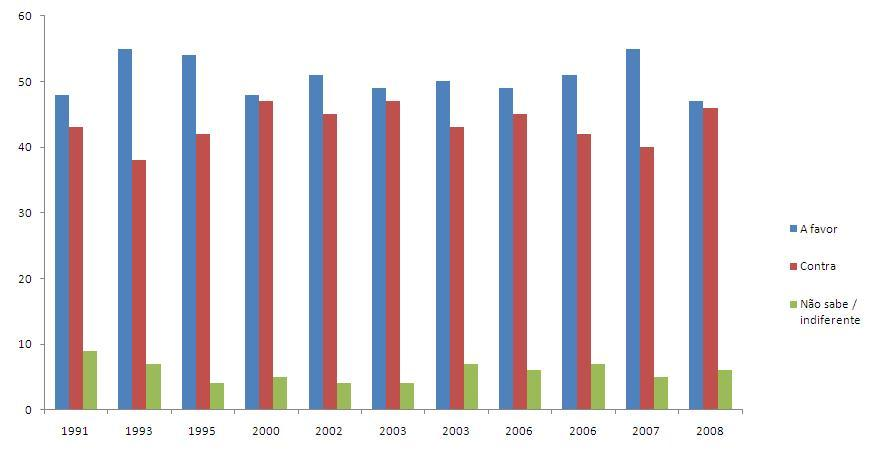
Opinion polls about death penalty in Brazil since 1991: Favourable Against Undefined Source: Datafolha institute.

Datafolha, a polling institute linked to the Folha de S.Paulo newspaper, has conducted an annual survey since the early 1990s regarding the acceptance of the death penalty in Brazilian society. The majority of these surveys indicate that most Brazilians are in favor of this form of punishment. The most recent poll (dated March 2008), however, indicates that there is no longer a clear majority on the issue. The difference between those who agree and oppose to the usage of the method is only 1%, and thus, within the margin of error of the poll. The results are similar to a 2000 poll conducted by the same institute, when approval of the death penalty had an abrupt drop, only to rise up again in subsequent years. The newspaper indicates that murder cases widely explored by the mass media during the time of the survey, such as the death of boy João Hélio (which also opened a debate on the criminal responsibility age), may influence the outcome of the polls.

A poll conducted by Sensus institute in January 2010 has indicated that most Brazilians are against the death penalty. More than 55 per cent of the 2,000 respondents share this opinion, practically the same percentage from a poll conducted by the same institute in January 2001.

By 2018, support for the use of the death penalty had grown significantly. 57% of Brazilians support the death penalty. The age group that shows the greatest support for execution of those condemned is the 25 to 34-year-old category, in which 61% say they are in favour.
