= Patxi =

Patxi is a male given name in the Basque language area in northern Spain and south-west France, but more commonly a nickname for those officially named Francisco (or François in the French zone, ultimately cognates of Francis); the original Basque equivalent was Frantzisko, but this was rarely chosen as a forename by parents in the modern era, and along with Patxi it was a forbidden name for babies under the language policies of Francoist Spain between the 1940s and 1970s, hence the widespread unofficial adoption during this period. Far less common spelling variations include Patxo and Pantxi, while Pacho is used in Latin America – although there Pancho is much more widespread, as is Paco in Castilian-speaking parts of Spain.

Patxi is a similar male diminutive name as Frankie or Paddy in English.

Notable people with the name or nickname include:

- Francisco Churruca, pelotari
- Francisco Gabica, cyclist
- Francisco Gamborena, footballer
- Francisco Mangado, architect
- José María Pagoaga, handball player
- Pantxi Sirieix, footballer
- Patxi Altuna, academic
- Patxi Andión, musician and actor
- Patxi Bisquert, actor
- Patxi Eugi, pelotari
- Patxi Ferreira, footballer
- Patxi Freytez, actor
- Patxi Garat, musician
- Patxi Goenaga, academic
- Patxi Goikolea, footballer
- Patxi Iriguíbel, footballer
- Patxi Iru, footballer
- Patxi Iturrioz, politician
- Patxi Izco, businessman and football club president
- Patxi Juaristi, sociologist, linguist and academic
- Patxi Lazcoz, politician
- Patxi López, politician (served as Lehendakari and briefly as President of the Congress of Deputies)
- Patxi Puñal, footballer
- Patxi Rípodas, footballer
- Patxi Ruiz, pelotari
- Patxi Saez Beloki, academic
- Patxi Salinas, footballer
- Patxi Usobiaga, rock climber
- Patxi Vila, cyclist
- Patxi Villanueva, footballer and coach
- Patxi Zabaleta, politician and writer
- Patxi Zubizarreta, writer

== See also ==
- Patxi's Chicago Pizza, American pizzeria chain
- Errementari, a fantasy-horror film that includes the protagonist Francisco Patxi
