= Francisco Santos =

Francisco Santos may refer to:

- Francisco Dos Santos (born 1974), Brazilian footballer
- Francisco Santos (swimmer, born 1962), Angolan/Portuguese swimmer, artist and writer, also known as Xesko
- Francisco Santos (swimmer, born 1998), Portuguese swimmer
- Francisco Santos (baseball) (born 1974), former Major League Baseball outfielder
- Francisco Santos (footballer) (1904–?), Portuguese footballer
- Francisco Santos Calderón (born 1961), Colombian politician and journalist
- Francisco Santos Leal (born 1968), Spanish mathematician
- Francisco Cabrera Santos (1946–2010), mayor of Valencia, Carabobo, Venezuela
- Francisco Santos, Piauí, a municipality in the state of Piauí, Brazil
- Francisco O. Santos (1892–1983), Filipino nutritionist and biochemist
