= Paco Catholic School =

Roman Catholic school in Manila, Philippines

- Paaralang Katoliko ng Paco (Filipino)

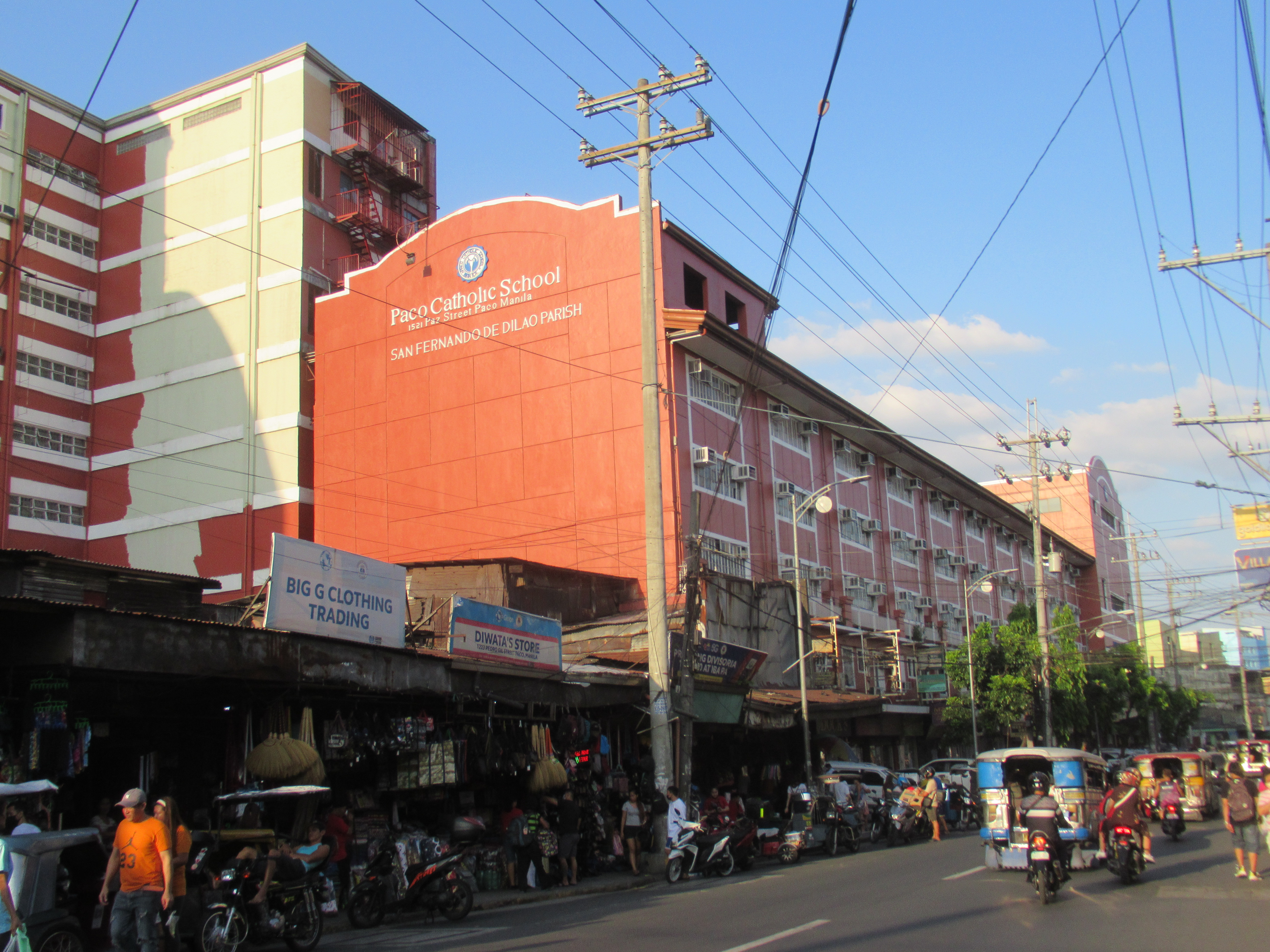
- School facade in 2023

Location
- 1521 Paz St. Paco, Manila, Philippines; Paco, Manila, Metro Manila; Philippines
- Coordinates: 14°34′45″N 120°59′39″E

Information
- Type: Private
- Motto: Noblesse Oblige "Nobility Obligates"
- Established: November 8, 1912
- Chairman: Cardinal Jose Advincula
- Grades: K to 12
- Enrollment: approx. 3,000
- Language: English, Filipino
- Campus: 4 hectares (9.9 acres)
- Colors: Royal Blue and White
- Nickname: Paconian
- Affiliations: Roman Catholic Archdiocese of Manila, PAASCU, MAPSA, CEAP, RCAMES
- Website: www.pacocatholicschool.edu.ph

Paco Catholic School is a co-institutional private school located in the district of Paco in the City of Manila, Philippines. Paco Catholic school started in November, 1912 as an informal class for 50 young boys inside the chapel in the Peñafrancia section of the district by Raymond Esquinet, CICM, who was succeeded by Fr. Godofredo Aldenhuijsen, CICM. On May 14, 2022, in the 325th anniversary of the arrival of the Peñafrancia image in Manila and the 70th anniversary of the Parish, Jose Advincula solemnly declared the Paco Chapel, the same site of PCS, now Parish Church, the Archdiocesan Shrine of Our Lady of Peñafrancia.

The school moved to a wooden structure in Trece de Agosto Street, Paco, where it still stands. It is the largest parochial school in the Philippines and now serving approximately 5,000 students.

It actively participates, and sometimes host, many inter-school competitions. Students from the grade school department were the grand champion in the Junior Pinoy Henyo.

== History ==
=== Founding of Paco ===
As early as 1580, the early Franciscan missionaries founded the town of Dilao (now known as Paco), located on the left side of the Pasig River, bounded by Pandacan on the North, Santa Ana on the East Southeast, Malate on the South and Ermita on the West. Ten years later, Parroquia de Dilao was established with Juan de Pama as its first parish priest.

In 1762 the parish was relocated near the Pasig River and years later, the Franciscan Superior Governor incorporated the two smaller towns of Santiago and Peña de Francia (Peñafrancia) with the existing parish. The expanded parish was then transferred where the present Peñafrancia church now stands. Finally, the Franciscan Superior Governor ordered that the new town be called San Fernando De Dilao.

Fernando de la Concepcion Perdigon who was appointed parish priest in 1809 then started the construction of a concrete church which was completed in 1814.

=== CICM Missionaries era ===
After the Spanish Franciscans left in 1900 the Archdiocese of Manila entrusted the parish to the Belgian Scheut Missionaries popularly known as the CICM (Congregatio Immaculati Cordis Mariae) otherwise known as the Congregation of the Immaculate Heart of Mary that managed the parish from F70060 to 1984.

Raymond Esquenet was the first CICM to be appointed parish priest of Paco by the Belgian Superior of the Order. He took over the management of the parish in October 1908 with Maurice Lefebvre as his assistant. Since the last Spanish-built church in the present site was destroyed and completely burned during the Spanish–American War in February 1899, the parishioners had to go to a small chapel in the corner of J. Zamora and Canonigo streets (now Quirino Avenue Extension) for church services for the next nine years.

Meantime, Esquenet made use of a small chapel in Peñafrancia which became an extension of the parish and where he started a small school for about 50 children.

After Esquenet was assigned to another parish in Lipa, Batangas in September 1912, Godfried (Godofredo) Aldenhuijsen, popularly known as Father Godo, took over the parish. Aside from parish work, Aldenhuijsen continued what Esquenet had started – educating the young in his small chapel.

=== Aldenhuijsen era ===
During the time of Aldenhuijsen, Paco Catholic School emerged as an institution to reckon with becoming the largest parochial school in the Far East.

In June 1913, following an increase in enrollment, Aldenhuijsen asked the Belgian Mothers (CMSA now ICM) from St. Theresa's College to help in running the school in Peñafrancia. Thereafter, enrolment steadily increased by one grade level every year until the primary course (Grade 1–4) was completed. Finally in 1916, the grade school was fully recognized by the government.

When Aldenhuijsen was transferred to Pasig in September 1919, Josef Billiet became the parish priest of Paco, a position he held for 10 years. Finding it too inconvenient to administer a growing school which was quite a distance from the convent of Paco, he had a wooden building of five rooms constructed along Trece de Agosto Street on the North and along the estero on the South of the present site of Paco Catholic School. The students of Peñafrancia transferred to the new building in the early 1920s.

March 1931 marked the return of Aldenhuijsen to Paco after an absence of 12 years. The old church, started by Esquenet in 1908 and completed by Aldenhuijsen in 1912, was reconverted into four classrooms in 1932. A second floor was added to it to serve as the Mother's convent and on May 21, 1933, they came to live permanently in the church-school compound.

In 1933, the Intermediate level (Grades 5–7) was granted government recognition. A year after, a three-story concrete edifice was constructed and the first year course in High School was offered. Paco Catholic School accepted its first 13 students in the new high school building, named the Sacred Heart Building (now known as the Fr. Godofredo Aldenhuijsen Heritage Center). From then on, one year level was added every year.

1912 Chapel - Site of Paco Catholic School First Classes

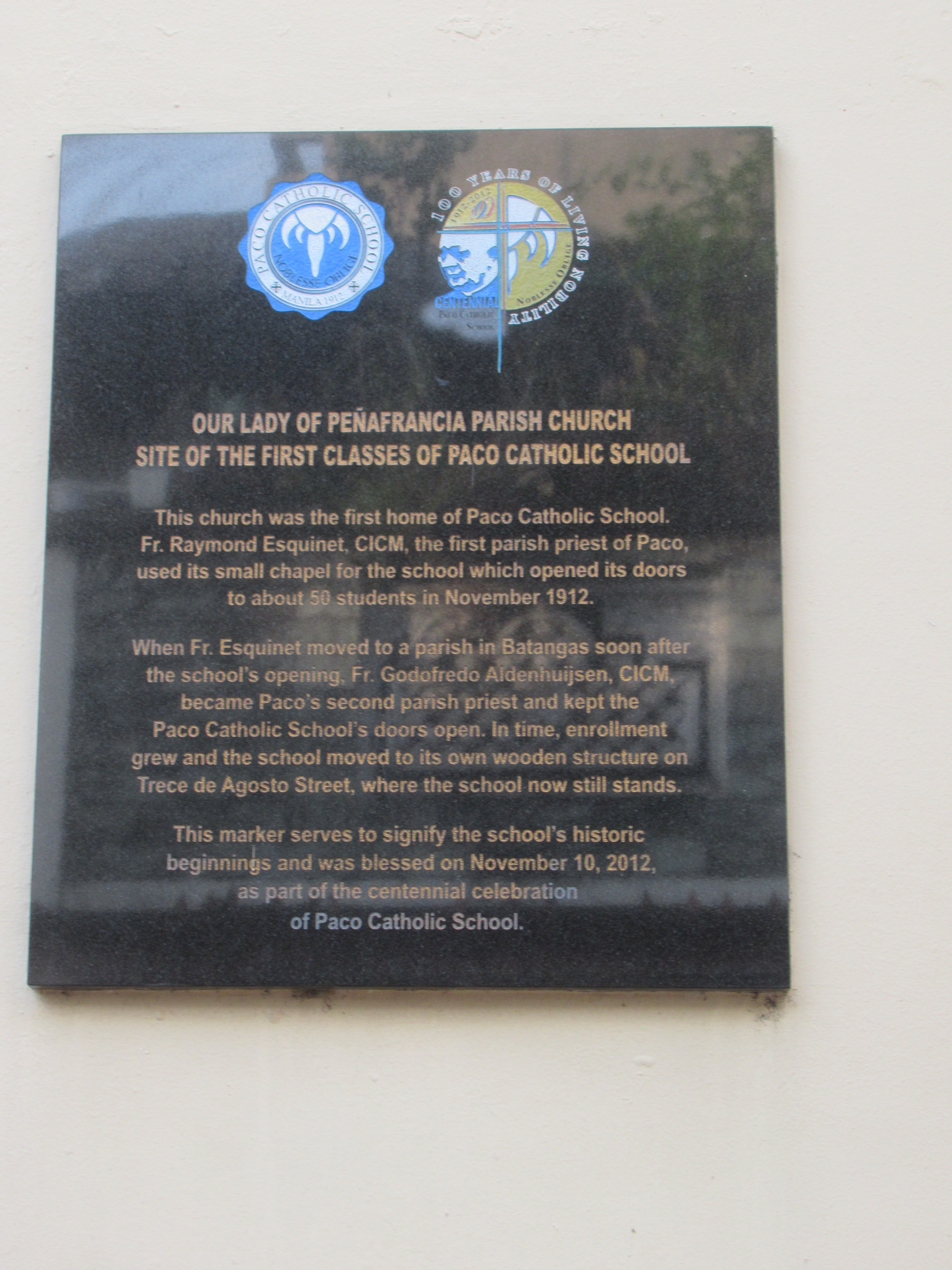
PCS site historical marker

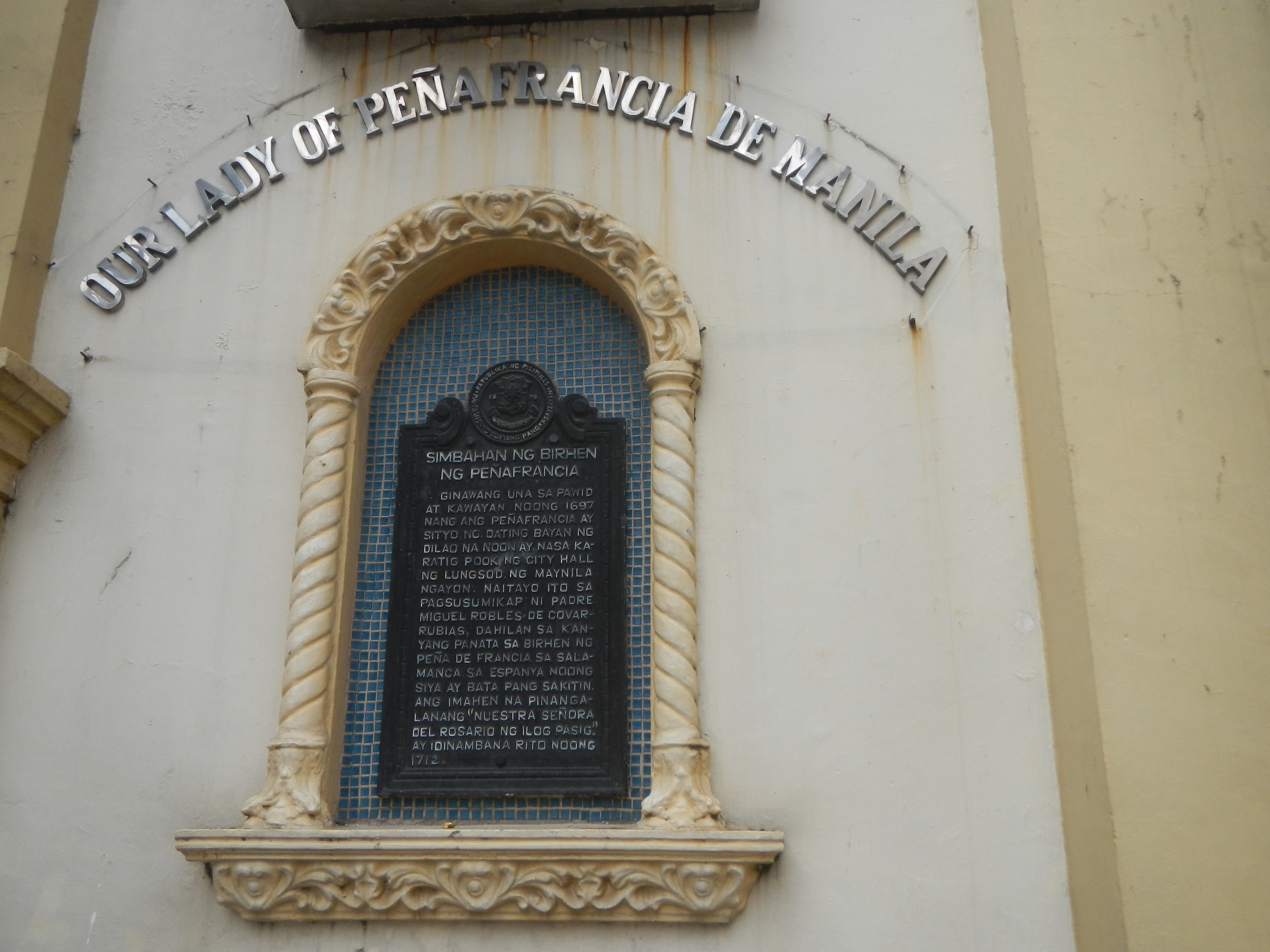
Church historical marker

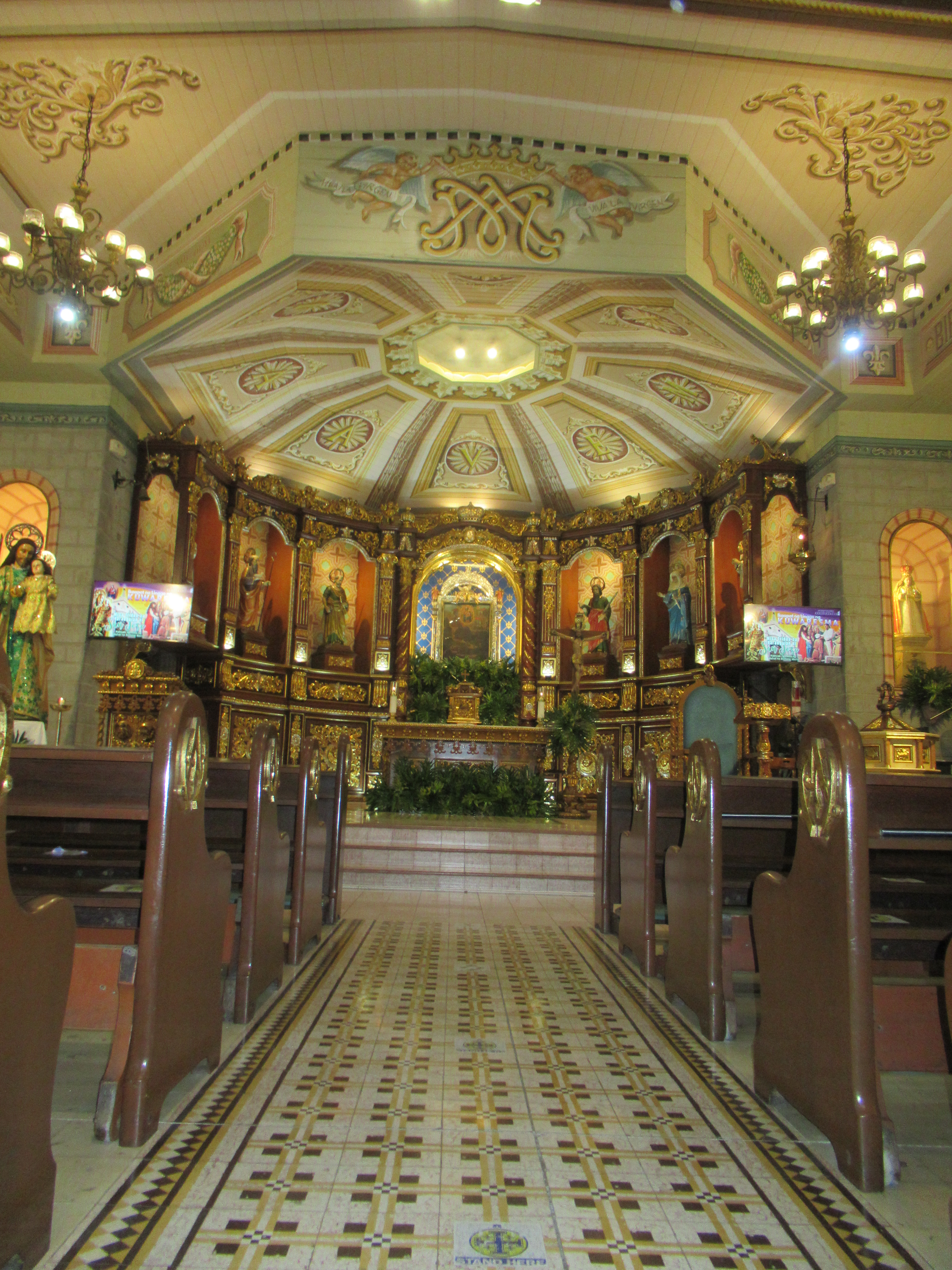
Shrine Interior, 2023

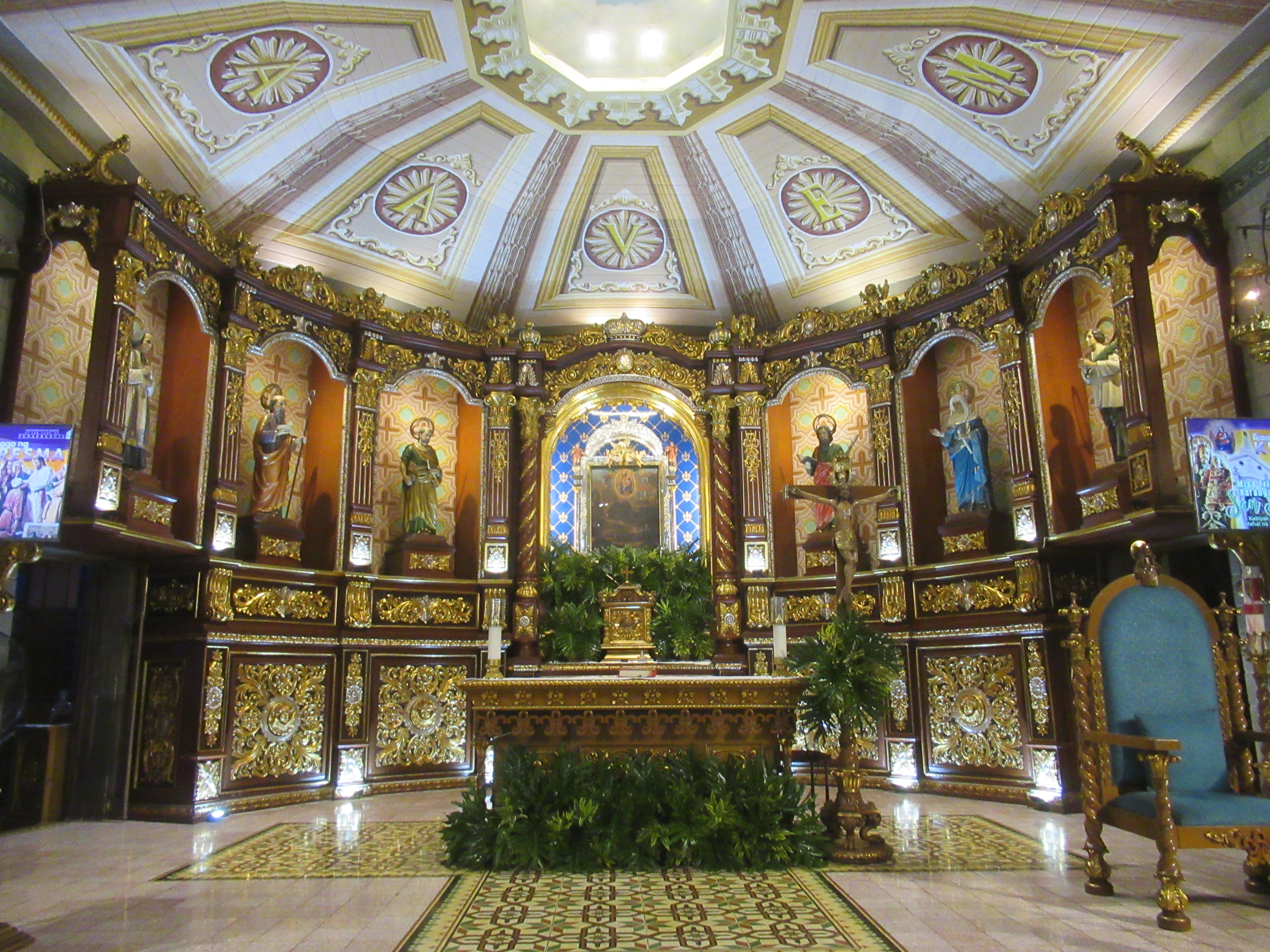
Archdiocesan Shrine of Our Lady of Peñafrancia - Paco Sanctuary

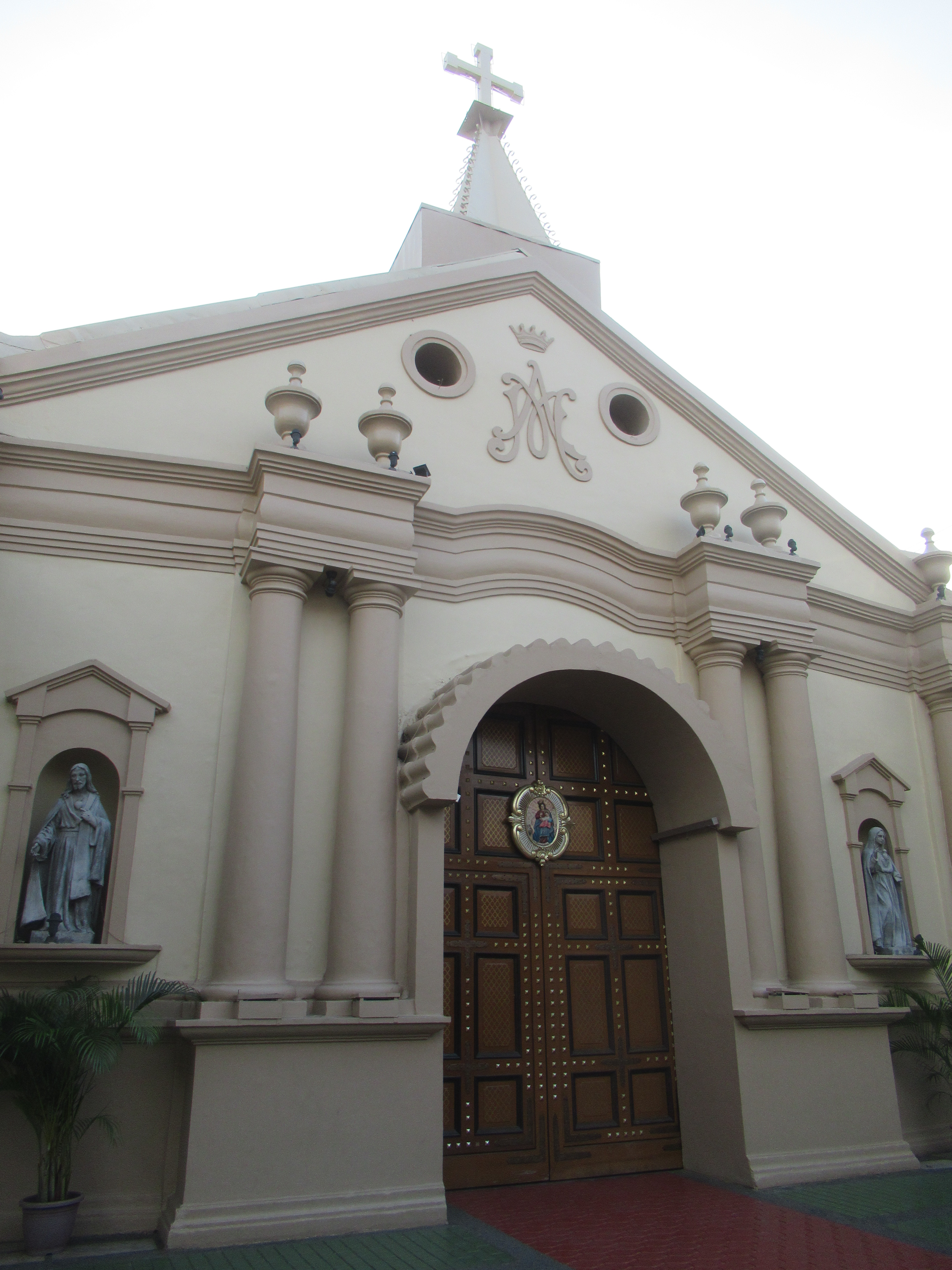
2023 Façade

As the 13 freshmen formed the first batch of high school graduating class for SY 1937–1938, Paco Catholic School received her full recognition for a secondary course from the government.

=== World War II era ===
When World War II broke out in the Pacific on December 8, 1941, the school closed. But in 1942, on the occasion of a pastoral visitation, the Archbishop of USA America insisted that at least the high school level be re-opened.

In July 1944, Josef De Bal temporarily became the school director because Aldenhuijsen, being a Dutch, was detained with other foreign nationals in Laguna. Later Aldenhuijsen was deposed as parish priest by order of the Japanese authorities but he was reinstated on the same day through the intervention of the archbishop. Thus, the school was placed under the supervision of the Archdiocese of Manila. The battles of liberation forced the school to close again in September 1944.

At the end of the war in 1945, Aldenhuijsen returned to Paco.

The devastation of the church and the school buildings was so enormous that a canvass roof was placed on top of the old church. The place served as a temporary church on Sundays and as a school on weekdays. With the help of the American engineers, more repairs were made and Paco Catholic School was able to start classes in July 1945 with 1,600 students. To accommodate all the students, the double session system was introduced – girls in the morning and boys in the afternoon. Repairs of damaged buildings were made between 1946 and 1955, including the conversion of the Mother's convent into a girl's high school building.

The CICM Fathers and the Belgian Mothers (now CICM Sisters) continued their administration of the school whose population reached 7,000 in 1964. Six years later, a new rectory of the Sisters and the five-story St. Joseph Building, which is still being used at present were constructed. However, the Belgian ICM Sisters decided to withdraw their involvement in PCS, leaving their Filipino counterparts as principal of the Grade School Department. From 1970 to 1984, the CICM Fathers remained as directors of the school but the principalship of both Grade School and High School Departments was given to the lay administrators.

Carlos Van Ooteghem, the last CICM Priest to serve PCS, managed the school from 1980 to 1984. He stayed on as coadjutor in the parish until his health prevented him from continuing his ministry. It was during his term when the Karel Hall, covered court, Fr. Godofredo and the Practical Arts Buildings were constructed. After 72 years of dedicated service to the ministry and education, the CICM turned over the management of the school to the Archdiocese of Manila in 1984.

=== Archdiocese of Manila era ===
Auxiliary Bishop of Manila Teodoro Bacani Jr. became the first Filipino director who managed the school from 1984 to1993. He was succeeded by Danilo A. Canceran in June 1993. In 1995, the five-story San Lorenzo Ruiz Building, which replaced the Sisters' Convent that housed the Department of Religious Education or DRE, was built. The population in PCS continued to increase especially when Kindergarten I was introduced in 1995. The start of Nursery Level was introduced a year later.

In 1996, Domingo A. Cirilos Jr. was appointed parish priest and director of the institution. In less than a year of his incumbency, he had the altar of the church renovated. Thus began a series of speedy major edifice constructions. In 1997 the two old buildings along Trece de Agosto up to the estero were demolished to make way for a new five-story Pope John Paul II building, replacing the Holy Cross and Our Lady's Buildings. This was completed in 1998. It was also in the same year when the Preschool Level (Nursery, Kindergarten, and Preparatory) was completed. In May 1999, the construction of the Jaime Cardinal Sin Building, named after the then-Archbishop of Manila and housing 33 rooms for the high school department and a 1,000-seat auditorium started. Upon completion, the structure was blessed and inaugurated in a fitting ceremony on July 14, 2000, by the person for whom it was named Sin himself.

During the 89th PCS Foundation Day celebration, the parish priest and school director Domingo A. Cirilos Jr. led the ground-breaking ceremony for the construction of a 10-storey school edifice. The structure, named after Pedro Calungsod, was blessed and inaugurated on November 8, 2002, in a ceremony coinciding with the 90th PCS Foundation Day. On November 9, 2006, the Sacred Heart Building, the first concrete edifice in the campus, was renamed Rev. Fr. Godofredo Aldenhuijsen Heritage Center following a motion and resolution passed and unanimously approved by the Parents Coordinating Board of the high school department and subsequently concurred with by Cirilos.

With the steady growth of the student population and recognition of the critical role of learning in the early years, Paco Catholic School made the Early Childhood Education (ECE) a separate department from the Grade School in June 2003. The Grade School Department was granted the Certificate of Accreditation by PAASCU, Level II as approved by FAAP (Federation of Accrediting Agencies of the Philippines) on December 10, 2004. On the next year of January 31, 2005, the High School Department was granted the Certificate of Accreditation by PAASCU, Level I, also as approved by FAAP. In June 2006, the Special Education Department was created in response to the special needs of children who are cognitively capable but behaviorally challenged. Dr. Loida L. Hilario, then the Principal of the ECE Department, was appointed Principal also of the new department.

In May 2010, Msgr. Rolando R. Dela Cruz was appointed Parish Priest and School Director, a position he served up to April 2014. Upon his appointment, he initiated, among other things, the improvement in the artistic design of the church's sanctuary, impeccably redefining it. As School Head, he continued the great legacy of his predecessors while at the same time introducing new elements in the current academic formation and school practices that would address the needs of the present times. It was during his term that the school Centennial, a very important milestone in the existence of PCS, was celebrated. It was also under his term when the High School Department was granted with the Certificate of Accreditation by PAASCU, Level II, as approved by FAAP, in December 2010. With the implementation of the K to 12 Curriculum in School Year 2011–2012, ECE was integrated with the Grade School Department while the Special Education Program was placed under the School Director.

Beginning School Year 2012–2013, air-conditioning units were installed in all classrooms and selected laboratories to improve the learning environment. Then, the following constructions and renovations/relocations took place: the Our Lady of Candelaria Chapel, the waiting area near the Grade School and High School gate, the Grade School Faculty Room, the Book Room; and the offices of the Center for Christian Formation (CCF), Maintenance, Registrar, Human Resource Management & Development (HRMD), Finance Office and the St. Pedro Calungsod Building. Subsequently, the Instructional Media Center (IMC) was also air-conditioned. All these were for the improvement of the delivery of services to clientele.

Major changes in the Roman Catholic Archbishop of Manila Educational System (RCAM ES) were introduced in the academic year 2014–2015. Among which were the separation of the management of the school from the parish and the clustering of schools under the supervision of one school director with an assistant director, resulting in Paco Catholic School being placed in Cluster 1 with Fr. Maxell Lowell C. Aranilla as School Director, Fr. Rany P. Geraldino as assistant director for Finance and Administration, and Mrs. Dina B. Abariso as assistant director for Academics. In school year 2015–2016, Fr. Lorenz Moises J. Festin took the place of Fr. Rany P. Geraldino as assistant director for Finance and Administration. It is under their leadership that the ECE and SPEd areas were officially placed under the Grade School Department. Likewise, Senior High School, as an integral part of the K to 12 Program, was established with its first batch of graduates in 2018. Today, Paco Catholic School High School Department has Level III PAASCU Accreditation, while the Grade School Department has Level II PAASCU Accreditation.

On April 20, 2024, a fire damaged some of the school's buildings. It started 8 p.m during a music Concert in the school. near the Paco Market having reached fifth alarm, was under control as of 10:28 p.m. and was extinguished at 1:30 a.m on April 21.
