= Paco, Manila =

District of Manila, Metro Manila, Philippines

Coordinates: 14.583°N 120.983°E

Paco
- District of Manila
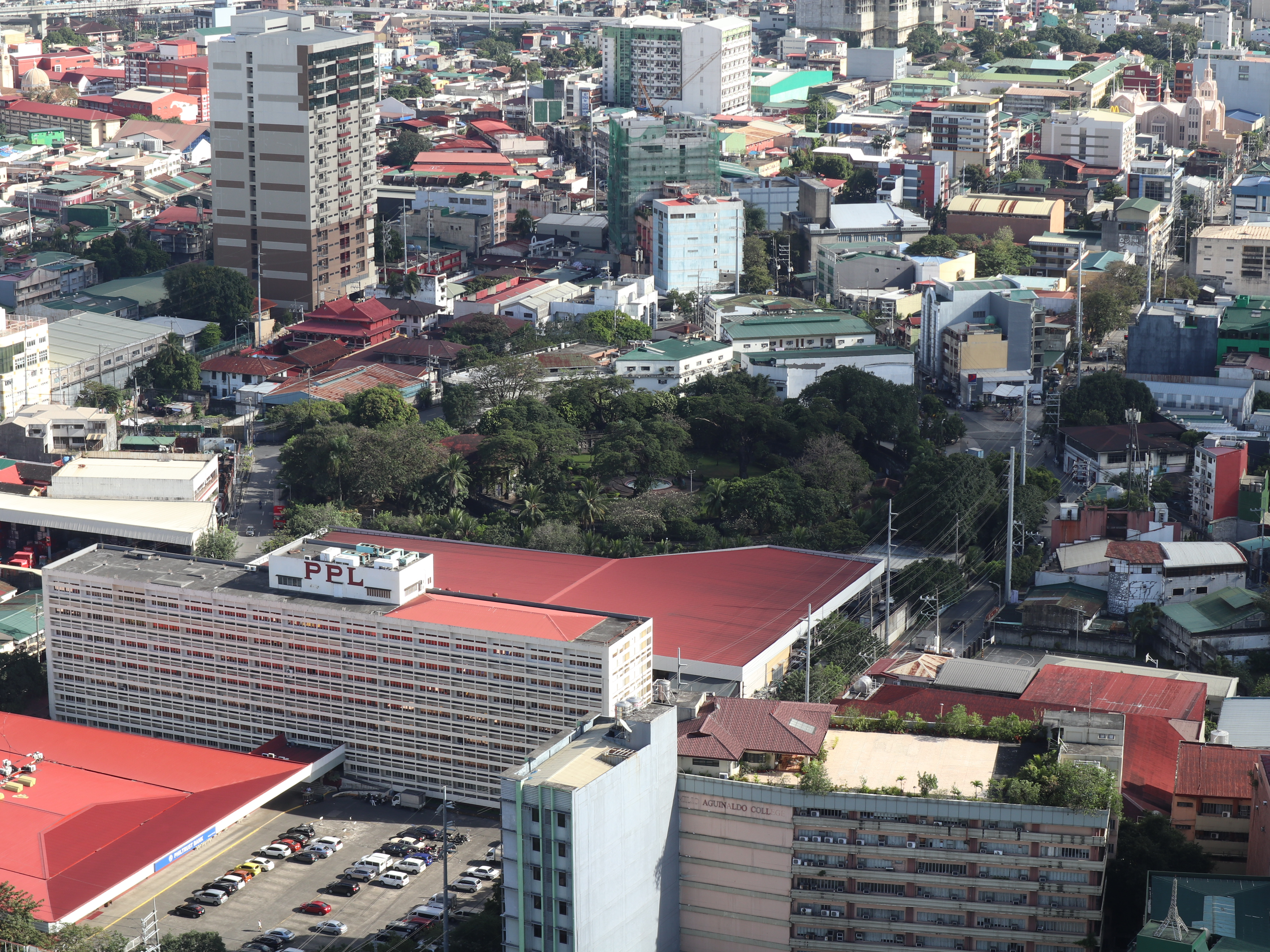
- Aerial view of Paco Park

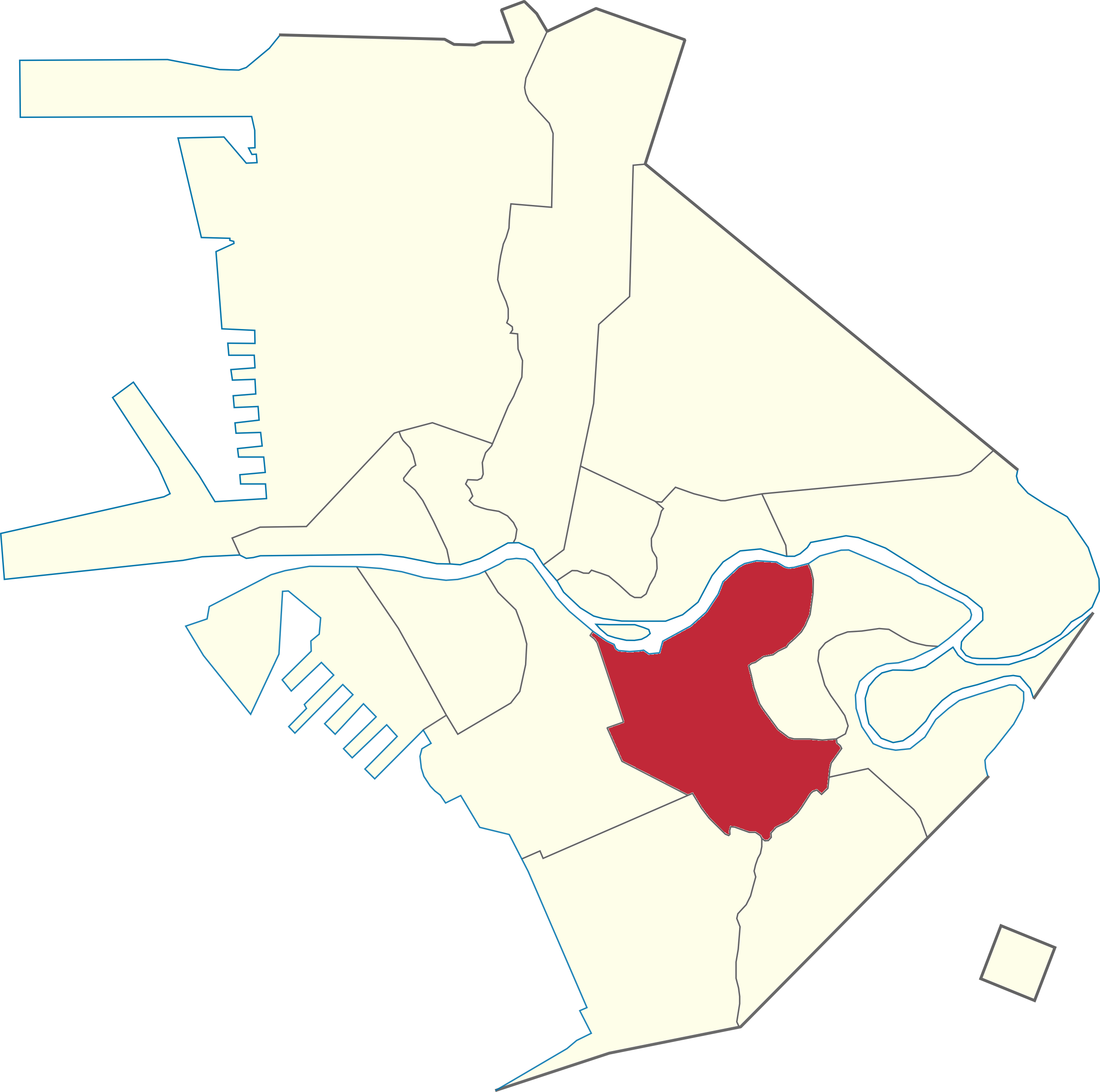
- Country: Philippines
- Region: National Capital Region
- City: Manila
- Congressional districts: Part of the 5th and 6th districts of Manila
- Barangays: 43
- Founded: c. 1580
- Founder: Spanish Franciscan missionaries

Area
  - Total: 2.7869 km^{2} (1.0760 sq mi)

Population (2020)
  - Total: 79,839
  - Density: 28,648/km^{2} (74,198/sq mi)

Paco, formerly known as Dilao, is a district of Manila, Philippines, located south of the Pasig River and San Miguel, west of Santa Ana, southwest of Pandacan, north of Malate, northwest of San Andres Bukid, and east of Ermita. It had a population of 79,839 people as of the 2020 census.

== History ==
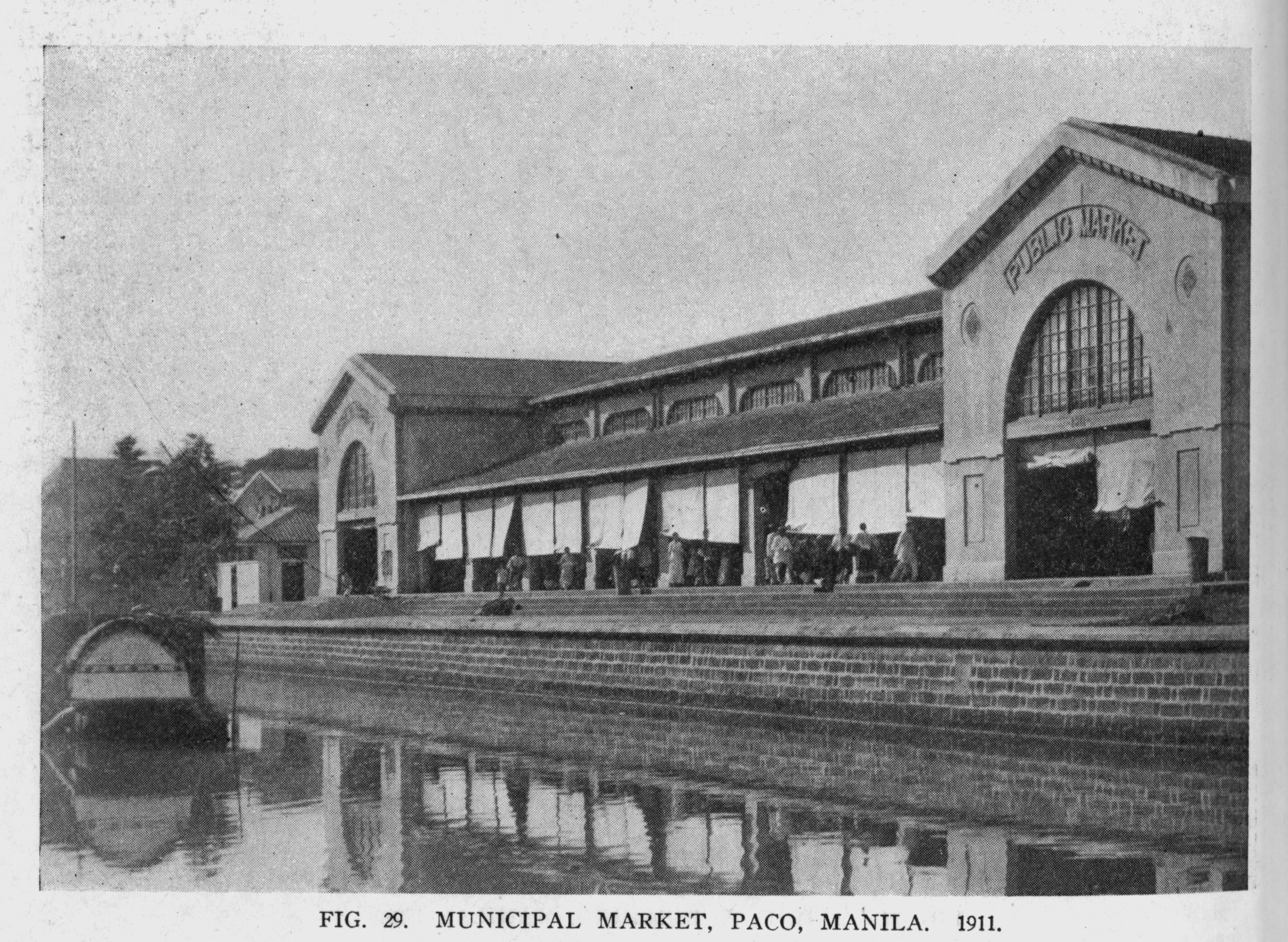
Municipal Market, 1911

Paco was known as Dilao because of the Amaryllis plants that were once plentiful in this district. Dilao or dilaw is a Tagalog word for the color yellow. Although, some sources say, it was named Dilao or "Yellow Plaza" by the Spanish settlers because of the Japanese migrants who lived there, describing their physiognomy. Spanish Franciscan missionaries founded the town of Paco as early as 1580. It was a town part of the province of Tondo, which was later renamed Manila in 1859, until 1901.

The Japanese established an enclave quite early or Nihonmachi in Dilao where they numbered between 300 and 400 in 1593. A statue of Takayama can be found there. In 1603, during the Sangley rebellion, their numbers reached up to 1,500; and later up to 3,000 in 1606. The Franciscan friar Luis Sotelo was involved in the support of the Dilao enclave between 1600 and 1608.

The name Dilao was used until 1791. The name San Fernando was added, making it San Fernando de Dilao. In the 19th century, the town of San Fernando de Dilao was given the nickname of Paco (which means Francisco). Paco, along with Sampaloc, Santa Ana, San Juan del Monte, and San Pedro de Macati became the second largest district to become part of Manila. It came to be known as Paco de Dilao and eventually Paco, as it is known today.

The Japanese led an abortive rebellion in Dilao against the Spanish in 1606–1607. Their numbers rose again during the interdiction of Christianity by Tokugawa Ieyasu in 1614, when 300 Japanese Christian refugees under Takayama Ukon settled in the Philippines. As population assimilated to native population, numbers dimmed. However, there are today around 200,000 recorded Japanese people in the Philippines, based on modern day immigrants' records distinct from the population of colonial era immigrants which assimilated to the native population.

Paco was incorporated as a district of the newly chartered city of Manila in 1901, thus reducing from its independent municipality status.

From 1907 to 1949, Paco was part of the 2nd congressional district of Manila. Reapportionment of districts made Paco part of the 4th district from 1949 to 1972. In the 1987 Constitution, Paco was split to the 5th and 6th congressional districts, with the former covering the southern half and the latter covering the northern areas.

== List of barangays ==
Zone and barangay	Administrative district	Legislative districts
Zone 71: Barangays 662 and 664-A	Southern Paco	5th District
Zone 73: Barangays 671, 672, 673, 674, 675, and 676	Southern Paco	5th District
Zone 74: Barangays 677, 678, 679, 680, 681, 682, 683, 684, and 685	Southern Paco	5th District
Zone 75: Barangays 686 and 687	Southern Paco	5th District
Zone 88: Barangays 809, 810, 811, 812, 813, 814, 815, 816, 817, 818, 819, and 820	Southern Paco	5th District
Zone 89: Barangays 821, 822, 823, 824, 825, 826, 827, and 828	Southern Paco	5th District
Zone 90: Barangays 829, 830, 831, and 832	Northern Paco	6th District

Fifth District

Southern Paco

Barangay	Land area (km^{2})	Population (2020 census)
Zone 71
Barangay 662	0.01324 km^{2}	1,601
Barangay 664-A	0.1585 km^{2}	640
Zone 73
Barangay 671	0.03397 km^{2}	1,227
Barangay 672	0.09134 km^{2}	3,133
Barangay 673	0.08489 km^{2}	2,764
Barangay 674	0.1768 km^{2}	1,398
Barangay 675	0.08596 km^{2}	1,988
Barangay 676	0.1475 km^{2}	1,431
Zone 74
Barangay 677	0.06482 km^{2}	1,591
Barangay 678	0.06117 km^{2}	1,294
Barangay 679	0.4506 km^{2}	931
Barangay 680	0.03812 km^{2}	968
Barangay 681	0.03503 km^{2}	1,094
Barangay 682	0.06793 km^{2}	822
Barangay 683	0.01948 km^{2}	784
Barangay 684	0.02984 km^{2}	2,730
Barangay 685	0.04547 km^{2}	1,044
Zone 75
Barangay 686	0.04315 km^{2}	3,250
Barangay 687	0.03438 km^{2}	1,434
Zone 88
Barangay 809	0.01958 km^{2}	1,189
Barangay 810	0.02513 km^{2}	2,293
Barangay 811	0.03306 km^{2}	2,332
Barangay 812	0.05098 km^{2}	1,703
Barangay 813	0.02246 km^{2}	1,001
Barangay 814	0.01700 km^{2}	2,196
Barangay 815	0.2892 km^{2}	1,374
Barangay 816	0.01067 km^{2}	781
Barangay 817	0.008420 km^{2}	1,716
Barangay 818	0.01419 km^{2}	1,388
Barangay 819	0.01458 km^{2}	2,007
Barangay 820	0.04513 km^{2}	1,417
Zone 89
Barangay 821	0.01365 km^{2}	1,995
Barangay 822	0.01358 km^{2}	897
Barangay 823	0.01714 km^{2}	3,002
Barangay 824	0.03873 km^{2}	1,302
Barangay 825	0.05945 km^{2}	388
Barangay 826	0.02126 km^{2}	1,760
Barangay 827	0.1127 km^{2}	2,661
Barangay 828	0.01625 km^{2}	2,658

Sixth District

Northern Paco

Zone/Barangay	Land area (km^{2})	Population (2020 census)
Zone 90
Barangay 829	0.1688 km^{2}	4,226
Barangay 830	0.4191 km^{2}	5,191
Barangay 831	0.1731 km^{2}	3,350
Barangay 832	0.09123 km^{2}	2,888

== Landmarks ==
The San Fernando de Dilao Church is a Roman Catholic parish church that served as the temporary pro-cathedral of the Roman Catholic Archdiocese of Manila from 2012 to 2014 during the renovations of Manila Cathedral in Intramuros.

The Khalsa Diwan Temple (a gurudwara) and Unilever Philippines is located on United Nations Avenue. Unilever was moved to Bonifacio Global City, Taguig. There is a ten-minute walk away is a Hindu temple at Looban Street. Presently, Dilao is traversed by Quirino Avenue. A loop road from Quirino Avenue is named Plaza Dilao to commemorate the once flourishing Japanese and the Japanese-Filipino communities and districts there in Japantown in Manila.

Paco Park, was a former municipal cemetery of the old city of Manila, and once contained the remains of Philippine national hero, José Rizal and the GOMBURZA priests.

The Osmeña Highway starts in this district and it leads both to Batangas City (South Luzon Expressway (SLEX) and Southern Tagalog Arterial Road (STAR Tollway)) and Visayas at Matnog, Sorsogon (SLEX).

Philippine National Railways owns and operates the Paco railway station.

The Paco Public Market located along the edge of Estero de Paco was designed by William Parsons and built in 1911.

Schools include the Colegio de la Inmaculada Concepcion de la Concordia, or simple Concordia College, and the Paco Catholic School.

In January, 2024, Archbishop of Manila Jose Cardinal Advincula unveiled the Important Cultural Property (Philippines) marker for Pope Pius XII Catholic Center along United Nations Avenue in Paco, Manila with Charles John Brown and Jeremy R. Barns, National Museum of the Philippines Director-General, witnessed by 80 bishops gathered for the Catholic Bishops' Conference of the Philippines's 127th plenary assembly.

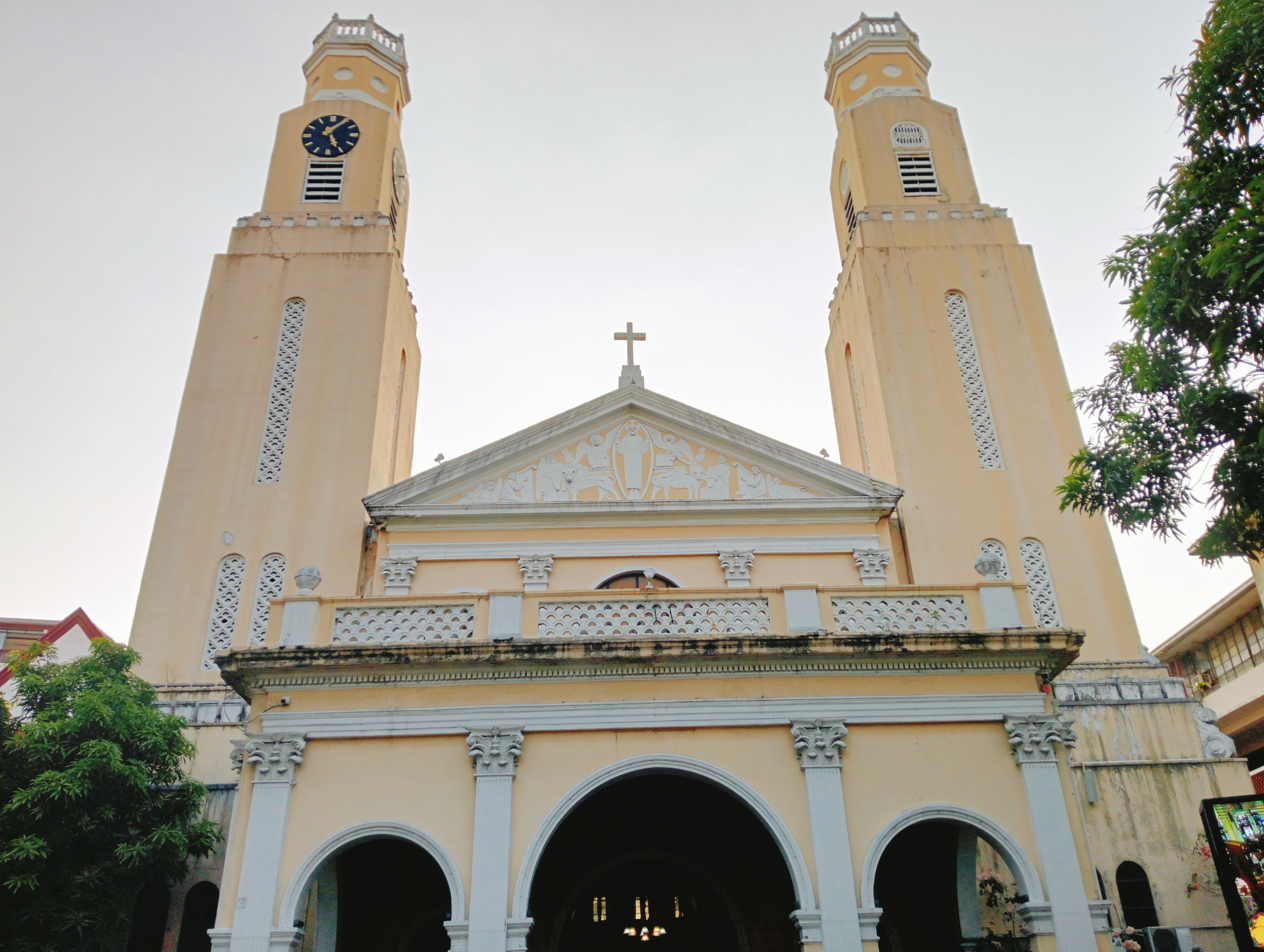
San Fernando de Dilao Church

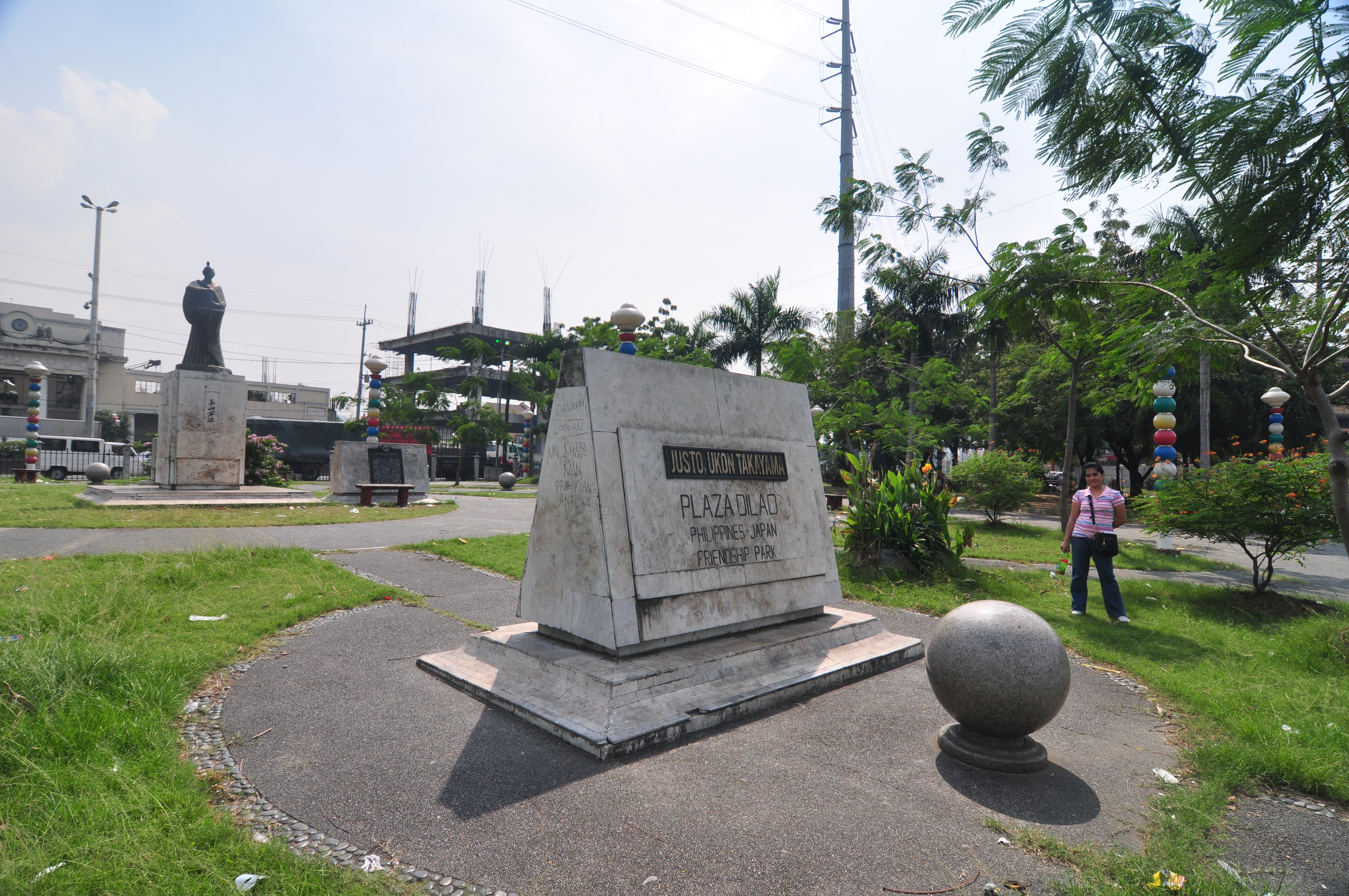
Plaza Dilao marker on the foreground, and Takayama's statue on the background.

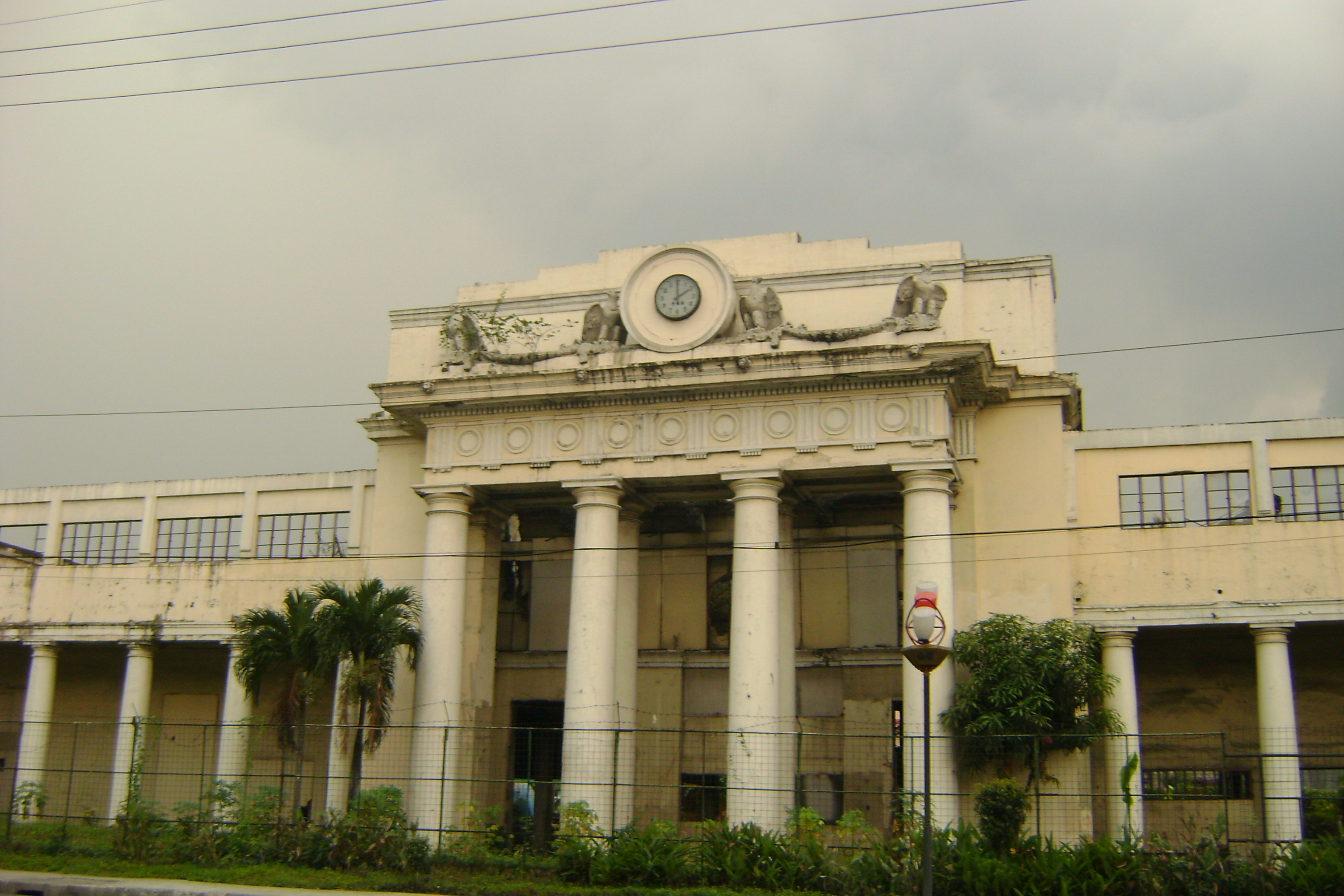
Facade of the Paco railway station.

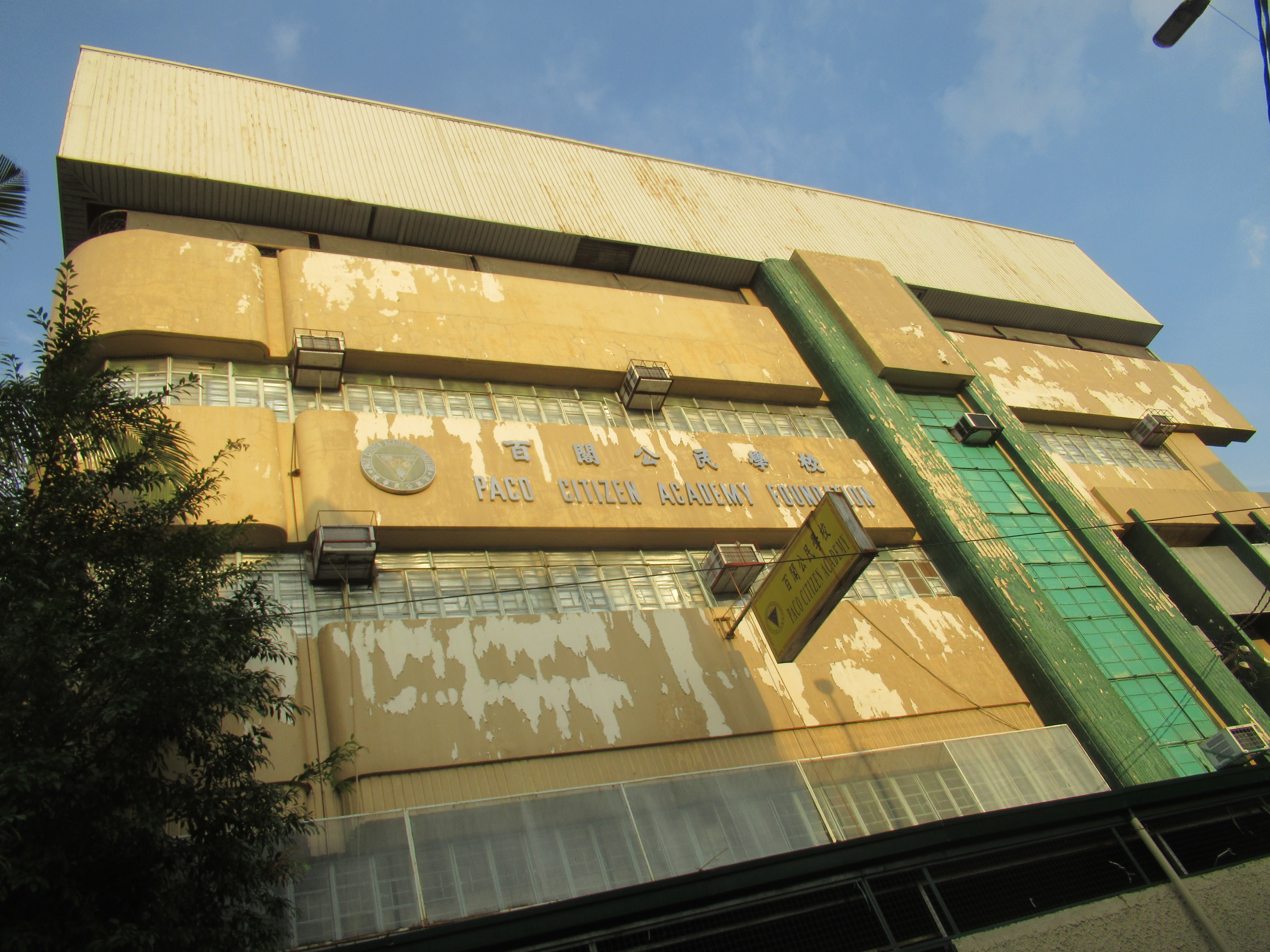
Paco Citizen Academy Foundation

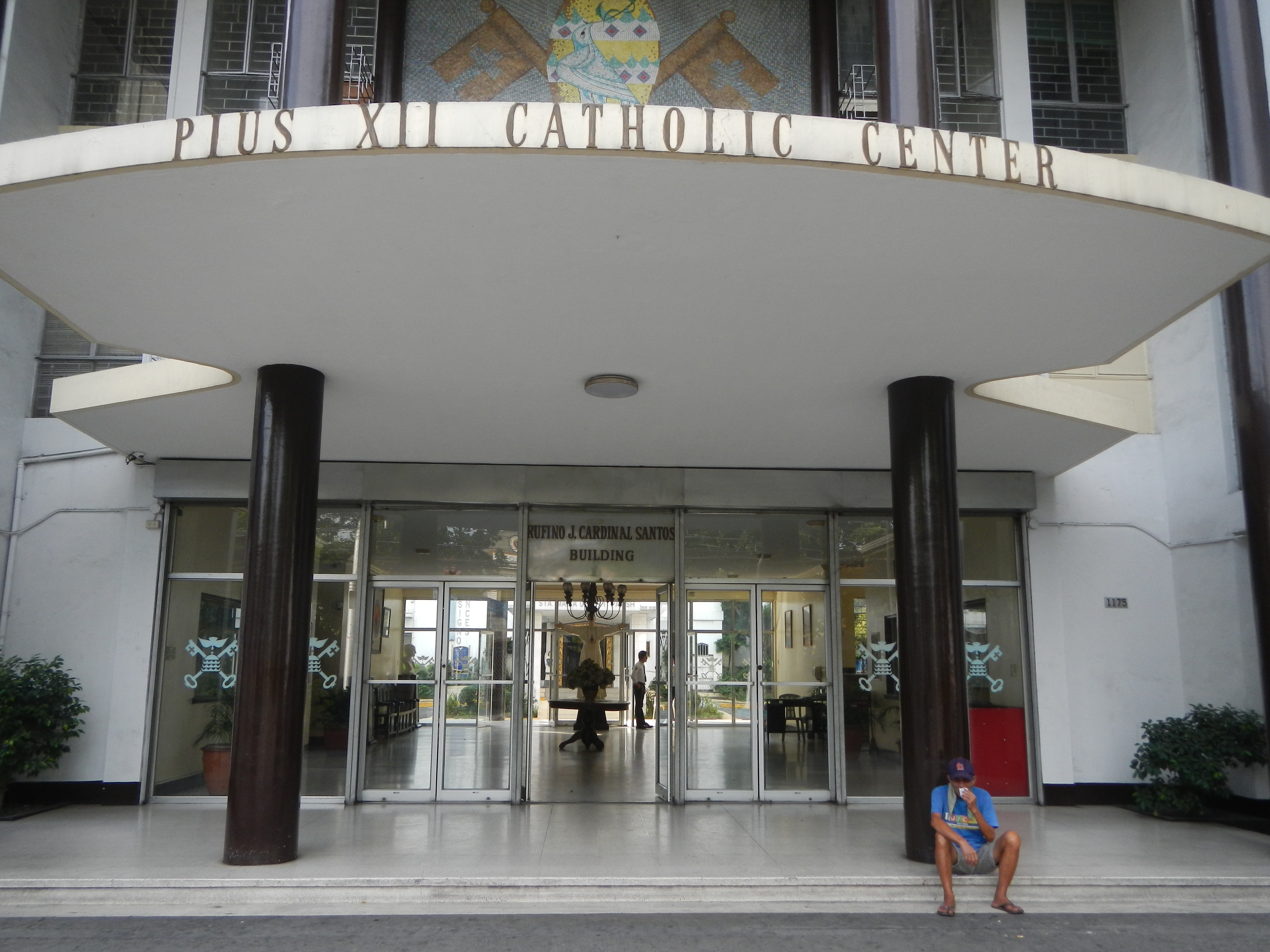
Pius XII Catholic Center

== Notable people ==
- Fernando Amorsolo
- Marvin Agustin
- Joaquin Domagoso
- Panchito Alba

== See also ==
- Nihonmachi
- Dom Justo Takayama
