= La Razón (Madrid) =

Spanish newspaper

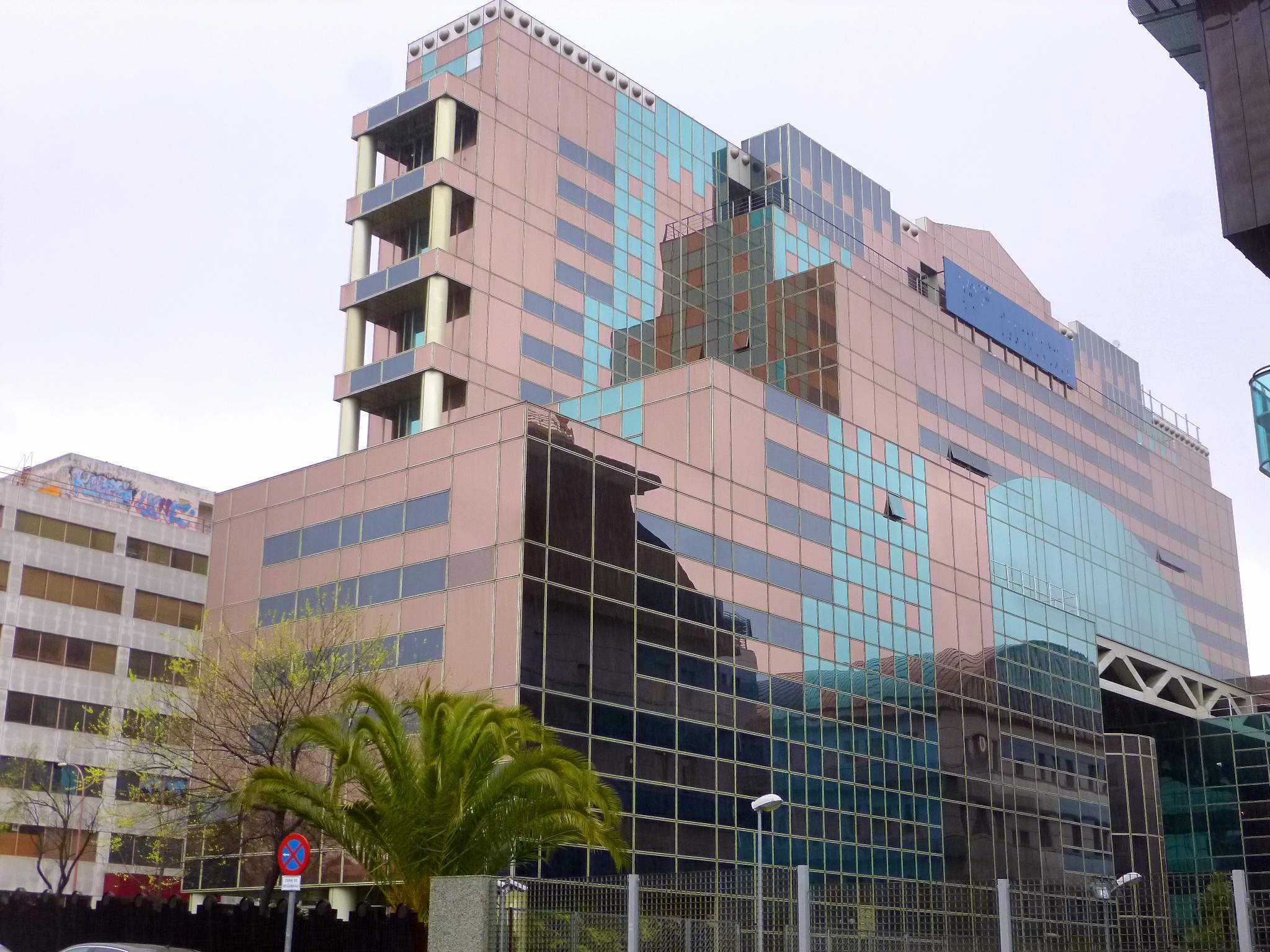
- Type: Daily newspaper
- Format: Tabloid
- Owner: Grupo Planeta
- Publisher: Mauricio Casals
- Editor: Francisco Marhuenda
- Founded: 1998; 28 years ago
- Political alignment: Conservatism
- Language: Spanish
- Headquarters: Madrid, Spain
- Circulation: 41,000 (2020)
- Website: larazon.es

La Razón (Spanish pronunciation: [la raˈθon]; lit. 'The Reason') is a daily newspaper based in Madrid, Spain. It has the sixth-highest circulation among general-interest Spanish dailies, and the fourth-highest among those based in Madrid.

The newspaper has satellite news bureaux, and local editions, in Barcelona, Murcia, Seville, Valencia and Valladolid.

== History and stance ==
La Razón was founded in 1998 by Luis Maria Ansón. The paper is owned by Grupo Planeta and based in Madrid. The newspaper's editorial stances are primarily neoliberal economically and conservative socially. The paper also has a rightist stance. La Razón has been a focus of attention for the intentionally provocative design of the front pages, even appearing in other media and causing big debates on social networks.

The edition of 9 May 2012 caused controversy in some sectors, and it was criticized by the Le Monde newspaper, having featured photos of five students with names and surnames and a text below describing them as "bad students" and "stirrers" to make a call for participation on a protest against the cutbacks on education. The student union decided to file a complaint against the newspaper. In the aftermath of the November 2015 Paris attacks, the paper published a doctored image of Veerender Jubbal, a Canadian Sikh, falsely labelling him as “one of the terrorists”. On 7 June 2016, Argentine footballer Lionel Messi won a libel case against the paper and was awarded €65,000 in damages, which he donated to the charity Médecins Sans Frontières.

== Circulation ==
La Razón had a circulation of 140,000 copies in 2003. The 2008 circulation of the paper was 153,024 copies. It was 124,284 copies in 2009, 118,466 copies in 2010 and 103,789 copies in 2011. Between July 2010 and June 2011 the paper had a circulation of 109,166 copies.

== Staff ==
Francisco Marhuenda is the editor of the daily. Leading contributors have included Alfonso Ussía, César Vidal, Carmen Gurruchaga, and Carlos Rodríguez Braun.
