= Khalsa Diwan Temple (Manila) =

Gurdwara in Manila, Philippines

- ਗੁਰਦੁਆਰਾ ਖ਼ਾਲਸਾ ਦੀਵਾਨ

Religion
- Affiliation: Sikhism
- Ownership: Khalsa Diwan

Location
- Location: Paco, Manila
- Country: Philippines
- Interactive map of Khalsa Diwan Temple

Architecture
- Established: 1929
- Completed: 1932

The Khalsa Diwan Temple (Punjabi: ਗੁਰਦੁਆਰਾ ਖ਼ਾਲਸਾ ਦੀਵਾਨ, romanized: Gurdwara Khalsa Diwan) is a gurdwara in Paco, Manila, Philippines. It is among the 31 gurdwaras in the Philippines.

== History ==
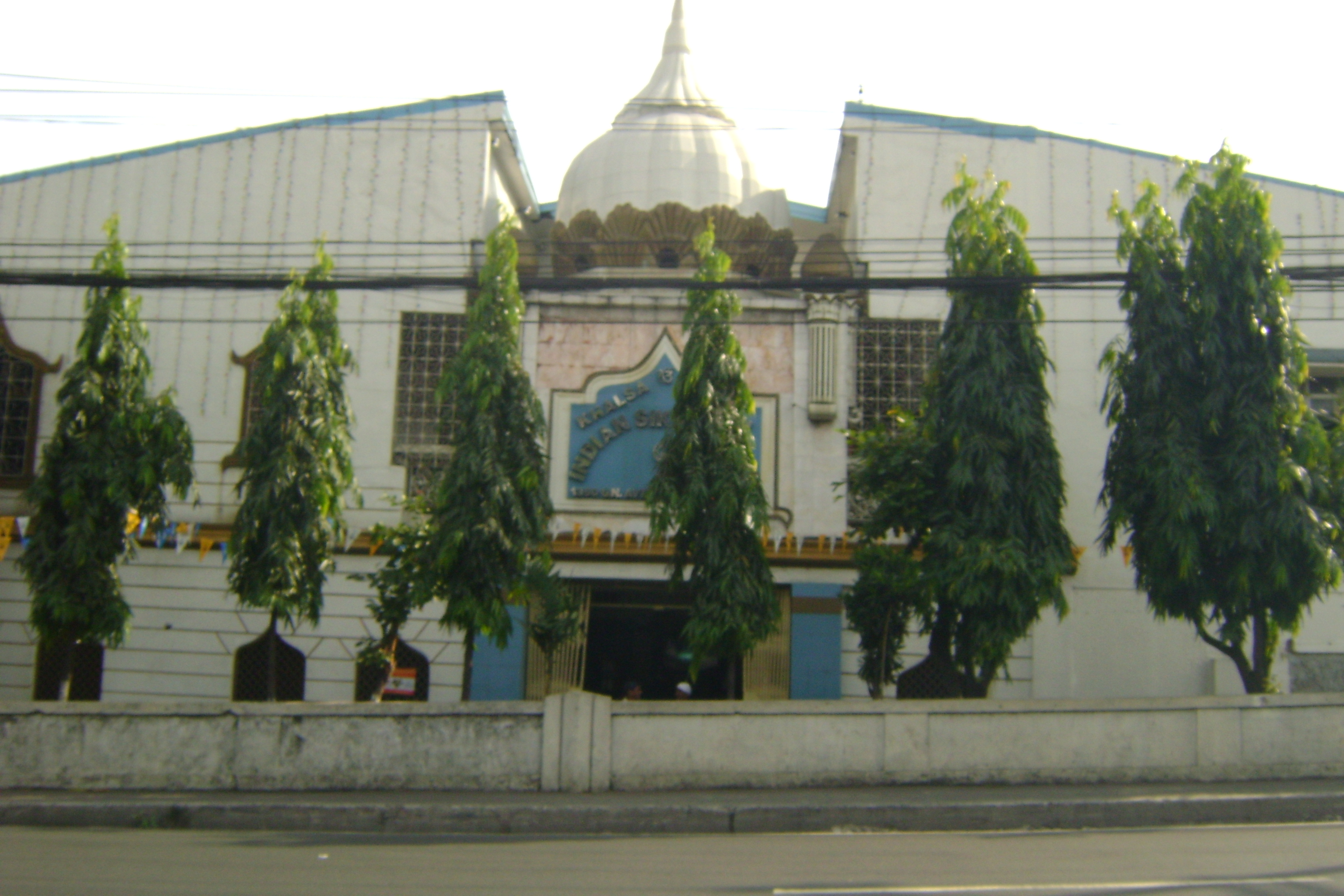
The Khalsa Diwan Temple in 2011.

The establishment of the Khalsa Diwan Temple is linked to the immigration of Punjabis to Manila in the 1920s.

After a copy of the Guru Granth Sahib was brought to the Philippines in 1929, a gurdwara was established by the Khalsa Diwan (Sikh association).

The building of the Khalsa Diwan Temple along Isaac Peral Street (now United Nations Avenue) in Paco, Manila was a joint effort of the Sikhs and Hindus. It was completed in 1932.

The place also became a community center for the wider Indian community, including the Sindhis and the Punjabis in general.

A redevelopment of the gurdwara will commence on November 17, 2026 in a ceremony where Indian Prime Minister Narendra Modi is expected to take part.

== Customs ==
The Khalsa Diwan Temple in Manila has a langar or community kitchen which provides free vegetarian food to people, regardless of their religion. While Indian cuisine is usually served, pancithas also been documented to have been prepared at the langar.
