= Vanity Teen =

Biannual fashion magazine based in New York and London

Vanity Teen Magazine
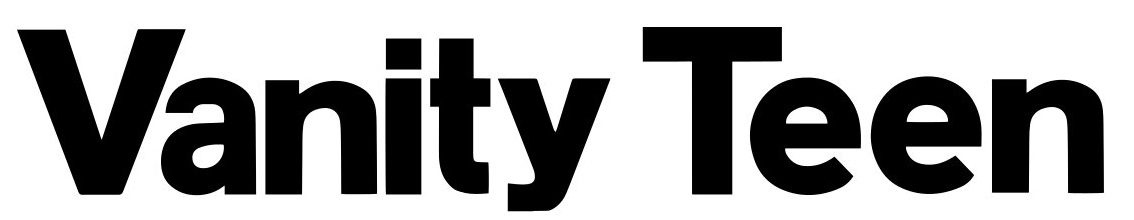
- Founder: Toni Pérez
- Categories: Fashion & Lifestyle
- Frequency: Biannual (Print)
- Founded: 2009
- First issue: May 2012
- Country: United Kingdom
- Based in: Paris
- Language: English
- Website: vanityteen.com
- ISSN: 2462-3210

Vanity Teen is an independent biannual fashion magazine based in Paris, France and founded in London, England, by Toni Pérez and edited by Luis Alonso Murillo. with Luca Imbimbo serving as Executive Editor-in-Chief.

It features young artists' work of new models from agencies around the world. Vanity Teen videos have also gained fashion media attention and have reached over one million views on YouTube.

== History ==
The magazine was founded by Barcelona-based photographer Toni Pérez, Zaragoza-based photographer Victor Soria and Graphic Designer Miguel Saburido in 2009. Toni Pérez, who was already involved in teenage fashion projects, contacted Miguel Saburido due to his interested in his graphic design work. Saburido, who was 16 years old at the time, started working with Toni Pérez on the first Vanity Teen issue in late 2008. By early 2009, the first Vanity Teen issue was released in digital edition.

In March 2012 after 3 years and 12 issues, Vanity Teen announced its first print edition to be available for purchase worldwide starting in May 2012.

On 1 November 2014 Costa Rican photographer Luis Alonso Murillo, who originally joined in 2011, became the deputy editor of the magazine during the launch of the new website. In February of 2022, Aedan Juvet joined the team as the magazine's K-pop editorial director, spearheading various features and cover stories with groups including Zerobaseone, Le Sserafim, and more.

== Covers and editorials ==
Some models and people who have been featured in Vanity Teen covers and editorials include Eitan Bernath, Ash Stymest, Barrett Pall, Luke Worrall, Nick Hissom, RJ King, Francisco Lachowski, Cole Mohr, Marlon Teixeira, Cameron Dallas and more.

== Vanity Teen China ==
In early 2021, Vanity Teen announced the launch of a new magazine oriented to the Chinese market called "Vanity Teen China, young attitude" featuring some of the newest emerging talents from the fashion and media industry in China, such as X Nine's Wu Jiacheng, Aarif Lee and Lelush.
