= Pancho =

Pancho is a male nickname for the given name Francisco (Spanish and Portuguese equivalent of Francis). The feminine form is Pancha. It is also sometimes used as a surname. Notable people with the name include:

== Given name ==
- Pancho Barnes (1901–1975), early female American aviator
- Pancho Carter (born 1950), American race car driver
- Pancho Coimbre (1909–1989), Puerto Rican baseball player
- Pancho Córdova (1916–1990), Mexican character actor
- Pancho Daniel (died 1858), bandit in what is now California
- Pancho Fierro (c. 1807/1809–1879), Peruvian painter
- Pancho Gonzales (1928–1995), American tennis player
- Pancho Gonzales (footballer) (1926–2016), Argentine football player, and manager
- Pancho Guedes (1925–2015), Portuguese architect, sculptor, and painter
- Francisco Guilledo (1901–1925), Filipino world champion boxer
- Pancho Herrera (1934–2005), Major League Baseball player
- Franklin Huddle (born 1943), American diplomat
- Pancho Magalona (1922–1998), Filipino actor
- Pancho Magno (born 1986), Filipino actor
- Pancho Martin (1925–2012), American trainer of thoroughbred racehorses
- Pancho Prin (1930–2003), Venezuelan musician, singer, and composer
- Ferenc Puskás (1927–2006), Hungarian footballer
- Francisco Ramírez (governor) (1786–1821), Argentine provincial governor
- José Francisco Ramírez (born 1976), Honduran footballer
- Pancho Segura (1921–2017), Ecuadorian-born American tennis player
- Francisco Varallo (1910–2010), Argentine footballer
- Pancho Villa (1878–1923), Mexican revolutionary
- Pancho Vladigerov (1899–1978), Bulgarian composer, pianist, and pedagogue

== Stage name ==
- Michael Locke (stuntman) (born 1979), a stuntman on the Welsh television programme Dirty Sanchez

== Fictional characters ==
- Pancho, sidekick of The Cisco Kid
- Pancho, in the Spanish language children's television series Plaza Sésamo
- Pancho, character in the Townes Van Zandt song Pancho and Lefty

== Nickname ==
- Marcelino Massana (1918–1981), Catalan anarchist guerrilla who went by the nom de guerre of "Pancho"

== Surname ==
- Cassa Pancho, founder of British ballet company Ballet Black
- Pedro Pancho (born 1934), Filipino politician

== See also ==
- Paco
- Panchito, diminutive of Pancho
- Pancha (disambiguation), female given name
