= Francisco Marhuenda =

Spanish journalist

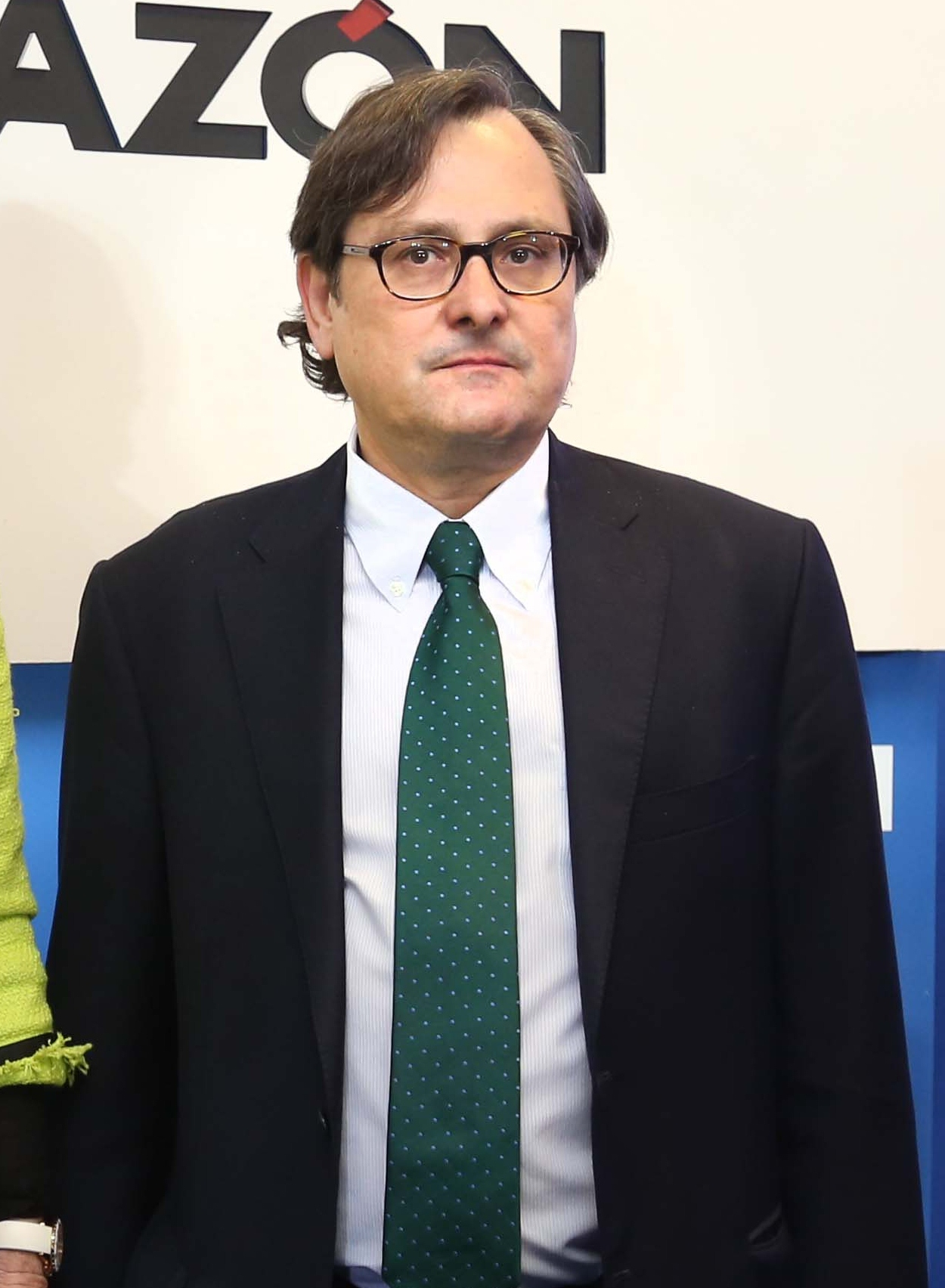
- In May 2013

Member of the Parliament of Catalonia
- In office 5 December 1995 – 23 May 1996

Personal details
- Born: 12 January 1961 (age 65) Barcelona
- Citizenship: Spanish
- Party: People's Party (1995–?)
- Occupation: Journalist, politician, political advisor, professor

Francisco "Paco" Marhuenda García (Spanish pronunciation: [fɾanˈθisko maˈɾwenda]; born 1961) is a Spanish journalist, professor and former politician.

Member of the People's Party Parliamentary Group in the Parliament of Catalonia between 1995 and 1996, he later worked in the staff of Mariano Rajoy during the later's spell as minister. Since 2008, Marhuenda is the editor of La Razón, a conservative daily newspaper.

== Biography ==
Marhuenda was born on 12 January 1961 in Barcelona. He graduated in journalism and later obtained a PhD in law.

He worked for the Barcelonian edition of the ABC daily newspaper.

A former member of the national executive of the UCD Youth Wing, Marhuenda joined the People's Party (PP) in 1995, and became a member of the Parliament of Catalonia after the 1995 Catalan regional election. He resigned to his seat in 1996, to become chief of staff of the minister of public administrations, chief of staff of the minister of education and culture in 1999, and director general of relation with the Cortes in 2000, always under the aegis of Mariano Rajoy.

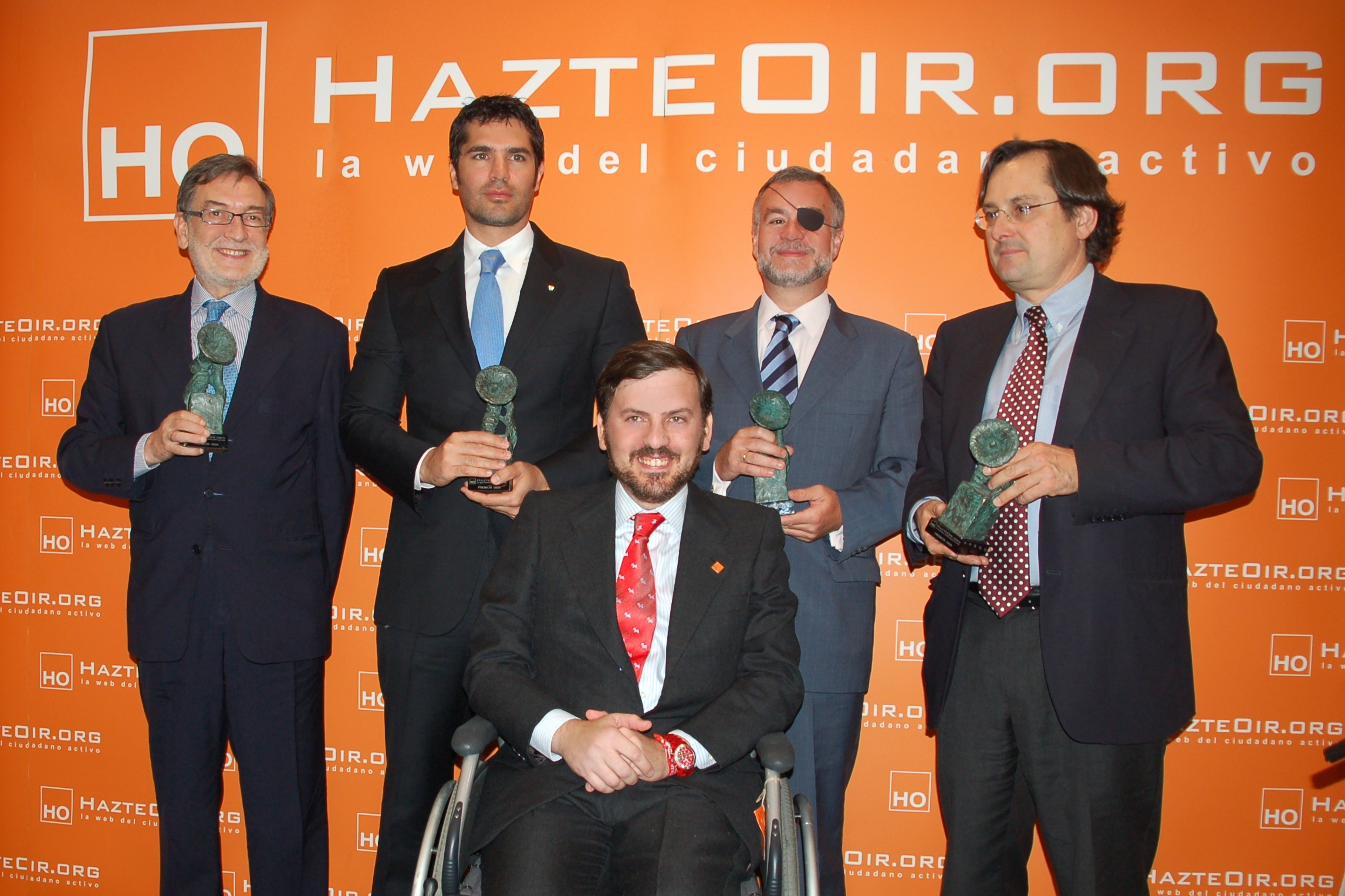
Marhuenda, in company of Eugenio Nasarre, Ignacio Arsuaga, José Javier Esparza and Eduardo Verástegui during the reception of the 2009 HazteOir awards

Following the ousting of José María Aznar from the government, Marhuenda returned to journalism. In 2008, Marhuenda, until then working as delegate of La Razón in Barcelona, was chosen by Mauricio Casals to become the new editor of the newspaper in Madrid. Soon after becoming editor Marhuenda described the leaning of the conservative and confessional newspaper as "unabashedly right-wing".

A member of the Catholic Association of Propagandists, Marhuenda obtained a second PhD in 2015 reading a thesis dealing with press freedom in Spain at the CEU San Pablo University.

In April 2017, Marhuenda and Casals were criminally indicted accused of participating in a extorsion scheme against the president of the Community of Madrid Cristina Cifuentes, which would have the purpose of hindering the investigations on the corruption case around the Canal de Isabel II water company. Soon after charges against Marhuenda and Casals were dropped.

== Criticism ==
In 1997, he was accused of defending Javier de la Rosa in the pages of the ABC newspaper.

Between 2002 and 2006, he was a member of the board of directors of Eurobank, a bank that went into administration in 2002 and was placed under special administration by the Bank of Spain, whilst its former chairman, Eduardo Pascual Arxé, was arrested in March 2013 on charges of embezzlement and fraud, following an order issued by Judge Mercedes Alaya. Although he remains charged in this case on suspicion of corruption, he is awaiting trial, which is currently being conducted by Pablo Ruz, the judge presiding over Courtroom No. 5 of the National High Court.

In May 2014, he was charged after La Razón published photos of the ID cards of twenty-two Catalan judges who had signed a manifesto calling for a referendum on Catalonia's independence.

== Works ==
- — (1984). Ramón Viñals. Cuatro años por libre. Barcelona: Editorial Acervo.
