= Chicho =

Chicho is a Spanish male nickname. It can be a pet name for many different Spanish names, including Francisco and Narciso.

Notable people known by this nickname include:

- Cándido Sibilio
- Chicho Frumboli, also known as Mariano Frúmboli, Argentinian tango dancer
- Chicho Jesurun, Antillian baseball player
- Chicho Ibáñez, Cuban trovador
- Chicho Sánchez Ferlosio, Spanish singer-songwriter
- Chicho Serna, Colombian football player
- Cristian Arango, Colombian football player
- Narcís Pèlach, Spanish football player and coach
- Chicho Córdova, Ecuadorian musician from KOOMA rock anormal and VimanA Ecuador
