= Paco Decina =

Italian choreographer

Paco Dècina is an Italian choreographer.

Decina was born in Naples in 1955, and studied science, before becoming interested in classical dance and African dance. He worked with several dance companies in Rome where he discovered contemporary dance and adopted American influences. In 1984, he moved to Paris; two years later, he became an instructor at the Conservatory of Champigny-sur-Marne. In 1986, he founded the Post-Retroguardia company, and in June 1987 he won the Ménagerie de Verre choreography prize with "Tempi morti", for five dancers (Milan 1987). "Circumvesuviana" (from the name of the train serving villages at the foot of Vesuvius) was produced in February 1988 at the Théâtre d’Ivry, and made Decina's name.

== Notable works ==
- La Douceur perméable de la rosée
