= Francisco Lachowski =

Brazilian supermodel (born 1991)

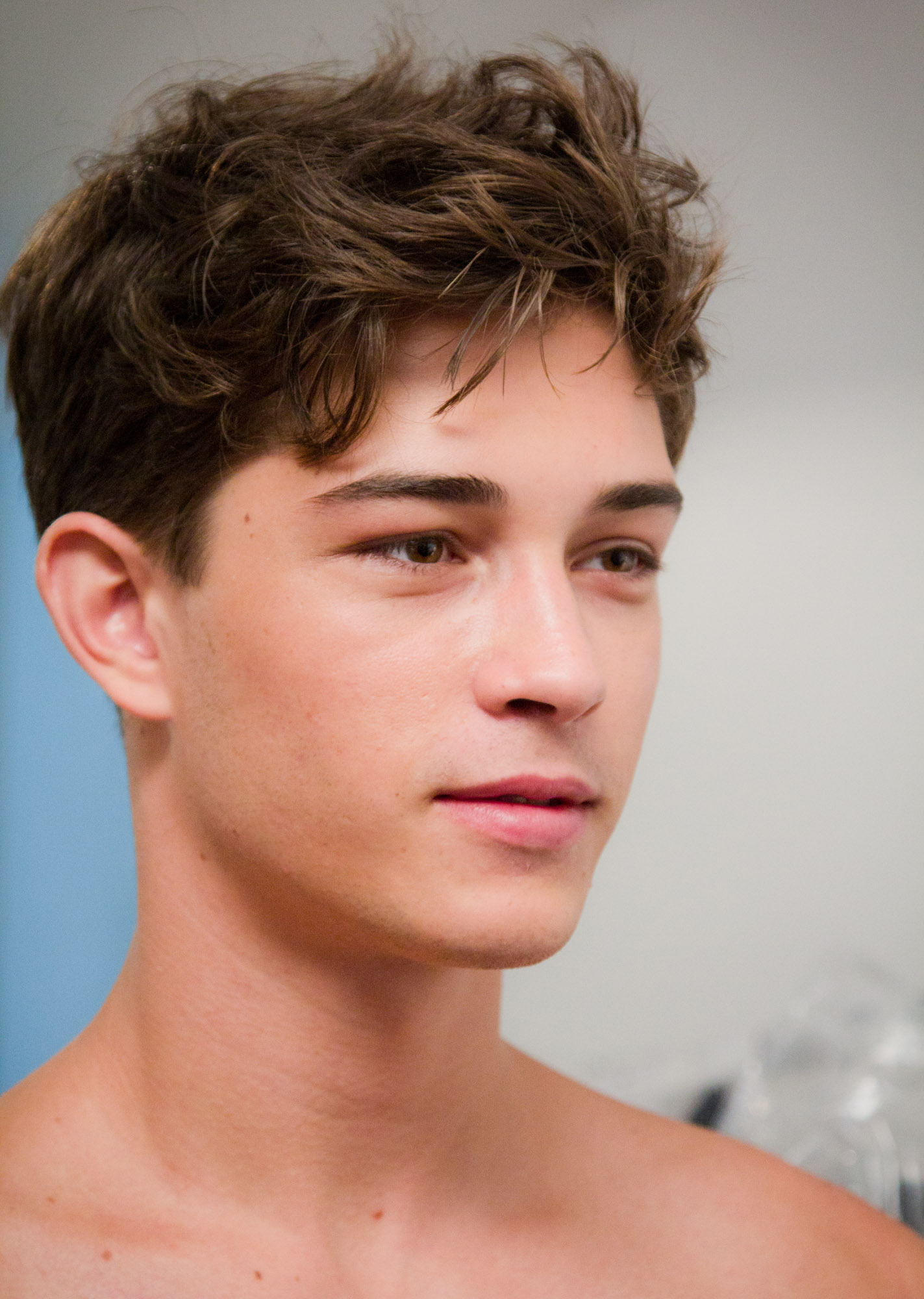
- Lachowski in 2011
- Born: 13 May 1991 (age 35); Curitiba, Paraná, Brazil
- Other name: Chico Lachowski
- Occupations: Model; influencer
- Spouse: Jessieann Gravel Beland (m. 2013)
- Children: 3
- Modeling information
- Height: 6 ft 4 in (1.93 m)
- Hair color: Brown
- Eye color: Hazel
- Agency: Partners (São Paulo); ONE Management (New York); Special Management (Milan); Chapter Management (London); MINT Artist Management (Berlin); Run Model Management (Brussels)

Francisco "Chico" Lachowski (Brazilian Portuguese: [fɾɐ̃ˈsisku ˈʃiku laˈʃɔviski], Polish: [laˈxɔfskʲi]; born 13 May 1991) is a Brazilian supermodel. He has been featured in advertisements for various brands, including Dior Homme, Balmain, Hugo Boss, Etro, L'Oréal, Armani Exchange, H&M, and Tommy Hilfiger.

== Early life ==
Francisco Lachowski was born on May 13, 1991, in Curitiba, Brazil to Roberto Lachowski, a Brazilian man who is of full Polish descent and Maria Lachowski who is of Portuguese and German descent. Lachowski has two sisters.

== Career ==
Lachowski first started modelling in 2008 when his cousin, fashion designer and architect Natalia Canalli, invited him to participate in a small fashion show done by her school. There he was approached by a modelling agency.

Lachowski began international modelling at the age of 17 after he won the Ford Men's Supermodel of the World contest in São Paulo in November 2008, for which he was awarded a contract with Ford Models starting from January 2009. He has since walked for many fashion brands including Jean Paul Gaultier, Dior Homme, Versace, Dolce & Gabbana, DSquared², Gucci, Roberto Cavalli, Thierry Mugler, Armani, and Balmain. He has appeared in campaigns for DKNY, Lacoste, Armani Exchange, Etro, Dior, DSquared², Mavi Jeans, Balmain, and Tommy Hilfiger. He has appeared on the covers of several magazines, including Vanity Teen, Homme Essential, Carbon Copy, Made in Brazil, Chaos, and L'Officiel Hommes. In addition, he has appeared in editorials for GQ, V, Vogue, and FHM.

Lachowski was awarded "Model of the Year: Men (Reader's Choice)" by models.com in 2016. He appeared in Kanye West's music video "Wolves" that same year. He was on the cover of GQ Portugal December 2018/January 2019 issue after winning "The Top Model" in "GQ Men of the Year" 2018. He has been described as an "übermodel" by Vogue and a "male model legend" by W magazine.

== Personal life ==
Lachowski met model Jessiann Gravel Beland in 2010 while in Tokyo, Japan. The two were married in 2013. They have three sons.

In March 2019, Lachowski and his family published a portrait book in collaboration with photographer Ricardo Gomes.
