= Francisco Santos (footballer) =

Portuguese footballer

Personal information
- Full name: Francisco dos Santos
- Date of birth: 8 March 1904
- Place of birth: Portugal
- Date of death: Unknown
- Position: Forward

Senior career*
Years	Team	Apps	(Gls)
- Vitória Setúbal

International career
1930–1931	Portugal	2	(0)
- * Club domestic league appearances and goals

Francisco dos Santos (8 March 1904 – ??) was a Portuguese footballer who played as a forward.
