= Francisco Toscano =

Spanish politician (born 1949)

Francisco Toscano Sánchez (born 30 June 1949) is a Spanish Socialist Workers' Party (PSOE) politician who was the mayor of Dos Hermanas in the province of Seville from 1983 to 2022.

== Biography ==
Toscano graduated in law from the University of Seville and worked as a labour lawyer at a firm also containing future prime minister Felipe González. He joined the Spanish Socialist Workers' Party (PSOE) in 1979 and was elected mayor in 1983, the first of ten wins, all with an absolute majority. From 2004 to 2012, he was president of the Andalusian Federation of Municipalities and Provinces (FAMP). After his final election as mayor in 2019, only 31 municipalities had a longer-serving incumbent who had been elected in the inaugural democratic elections of 1979; all were tiny except Luis Partida in Villanueva de la Cañada (23,000 inhabitants).

One of the projects of Toscano's mayoralty was Entrenúcleos, a new housing estate with over 20,000 dwellings, on streets named after politicians. There was some criticism over 22 of the 28 streets being named after members of his party.

At a party level, he was an influential backer of Josep Borrell, José Luis Rodríguez Zapatero and Pedro Sánchez to be national leader, and for Juan Espadas to lead the party in Andalusia. After Sánchez resigned in October 2016, Toscano was key in persuading him to challenge for the PSOE leadership again; he announced his candidacy in Dos Hermanas. Toscano held the titular role as president of the PSOE's federal committee, but never held an executive role within the party.

Toscano resigned on 22 January 2022, with his wife Basilia Sanz taking over as interim until the investiture of his named successor Francisco Rodríguez. Toscano ruled out having a declining body or mind for his job, but said that he resigned so that his age could not be used as an argument against the PSOE in the 2023 elections.
