= Pilar, Alagoas =

Municipality of Alagoas, Brazil

Pilar
- Municipality of Alagoas, Brazil
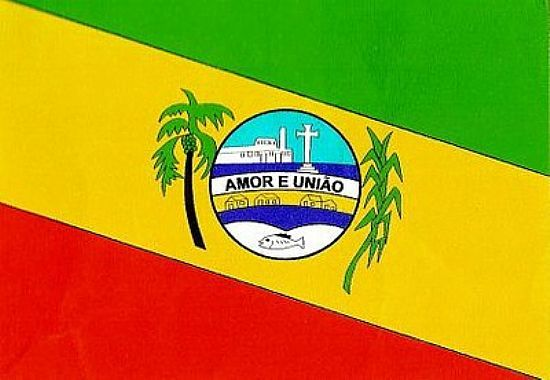
- Flag

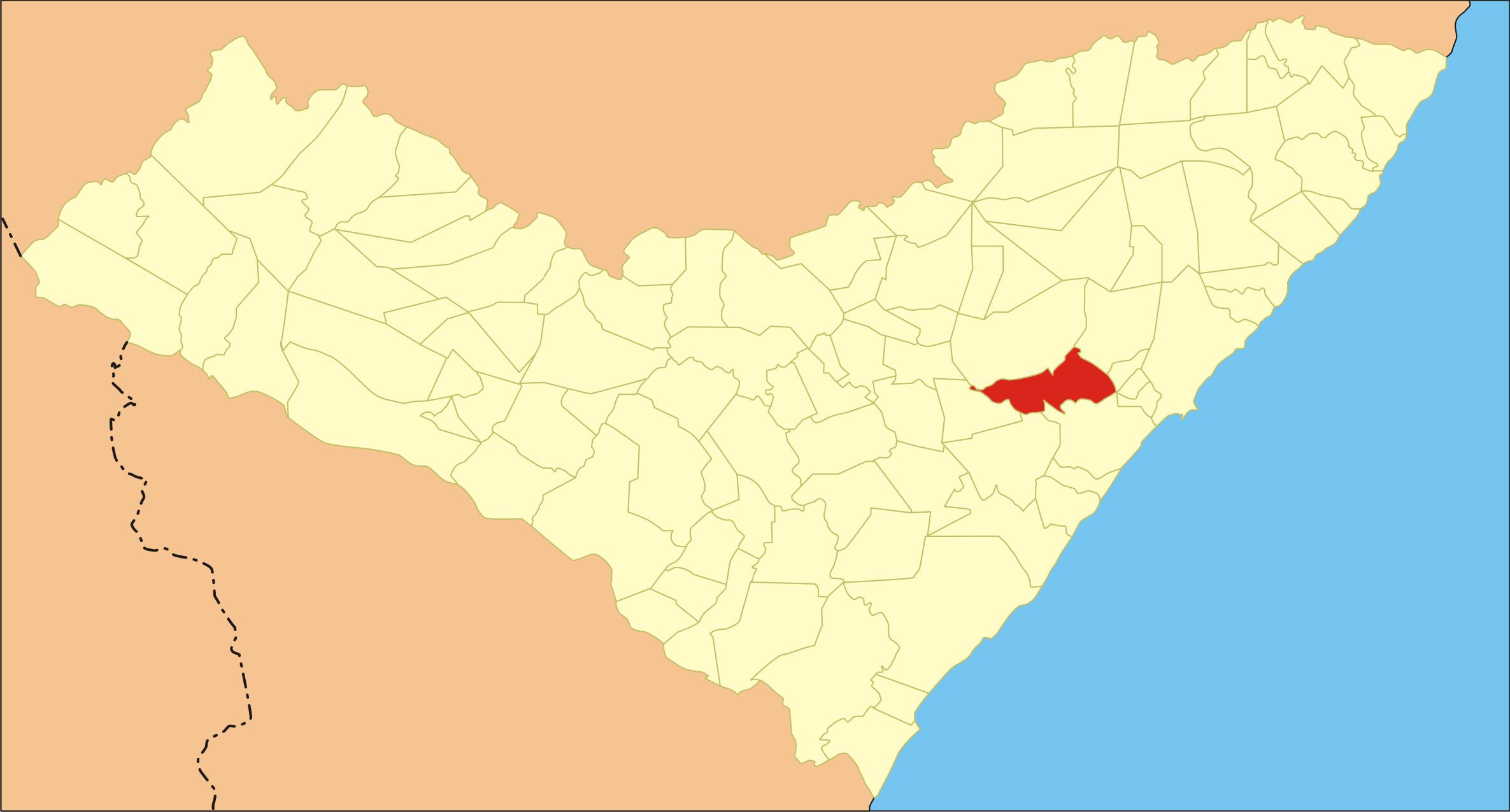
- Location of Pilar in Alagoas

- Location within Brazil Location within South America
- Coordinates: 9°35′50″S 35°57′24″W
- Country: Brazil
- Region: Northeast
- State: Alagoas
- Founded: 16 March 1872

Government
  - Mayor: Maria de Fatima Resende Rocha Oiticica (MDB) (2025-2028)
  - Vice Mayor: Tayronne Henrique dos Santos (MDB) (2025-2028)

Area
  - Total: 259.614 km^{2} (100.238 sq mi)
- Elevation: 13 m (43 ft)

Population (2022)
  - Total: 35,370
  - Density: 136.24/km^{2} (352.9/sq mi)
- Demonym: Pilarense (Brazilian Portuguese)
- Time zone: UTC-03:00 (Brasília Time)
- Postal code: 57150-000
- HDI (2010): 0.610 – medium
- Website: pilar.al.gov.br

Pilar (Central northeastern portuguese pronunciation: [piˈla]) is a municipality located in the Brazilian state of Alagoas. Its population was 35,212 (2020) and its area is 249 km^{2} (96 sq mi). On March 28, 1876, Pilar carried out the last official execution of Brazil when it hanged the slave Francisco.

== See also ==
- List of municipalities in Alagoas
