= Francisco Ayala =

Francisco Ayala may refer to:

- Francisco Ayala (novelist) (1906–2009), Spanish novelist
- Francisco J. Ayala (1934–2023), Spanish-American biologist and philosopher
- Francisco Ayala (footballer) (born 1989), Chilean footballer
