= Francisco (surname) =

Francisco is a surname of Spanish or Portuguese origin. The surname is common in the Philippines as well as Mexico.

== People ==
- Aaron Francisco, American football player
- Antônio Francisco (1923–1997), better known as Nininho, Brazilian football player
- Botong Francisco (1912–1969), Filipino painter
- Candela Francisco, Argentinian chess player
- Frank Francisco, Dominican professional baseball pitcher
- Henry Francisco (1686?–1820), French-American alleged Supercentenarian
- João Francisco, Brazilian football player
- Jason Francisco, Filipino actor and comedian
- Manuel Francisco, South African professional snooker player
- Noel Francisco, American attorney, Solicitor General of the United States (2017–2020)
- Osmar Francisco, Brazilian footballer
- Pablo Francisco, American stand-up comedian
- Peter Francisco (1760–1831), American Revolutionary War soldier
- Peter Francisco (snooker player), South African professional snooker player
- Sergio Francisco (born 1979), Spanish footballer
- Silvino Francisco (1946–2024), South African professional snooker player
- Yuan Francisco (born 2010), Filipino child actor and commercial model

== See also ==
- Francisco (disambiguation)
