= Francisco (slave) =

Last person to be executed in Brazil

Francisco (died 28 April 1876) was the last person to be executed in Brazil. A slave, he was hanged for the murder of his masters.

In 1874, Francisco and two other slaves, Prudêncio and Vicente, were arrested for beating to death their masters, João Evangelista de Lima and his wife Josepha Marta de Lima. The act was committed in Pilar, Alagoas. Francisco and Prudêncio fled to Pesqueira; in a confrontation with police, Prudêncio was killed and Francisco was captured. Vicente had fled to Marechal Deodoro, where he was captured.

At Francisco and Vicente's trial, they were both found guilty of the murders. Francisco was sentenced to death by hanging and Vicente was sentenced to life imprisonment. Both appealed to Emperor Dom Pedro II for clemency; Francisco's appeal was denied and the emperor did not respond to Vicente's. Vicente later died in prison.

Francisco's execution was carried out in Pilar on 28 April 1876. It was the last execution carried out in Brazil.

Since 2000, an annual re-enactment of Francisco's last hours has been held in Pilar on 28 April. In part, the re-enactment is intended to celebrate the abolition of the death penalty in Brazil.
