= Francis (given name) =

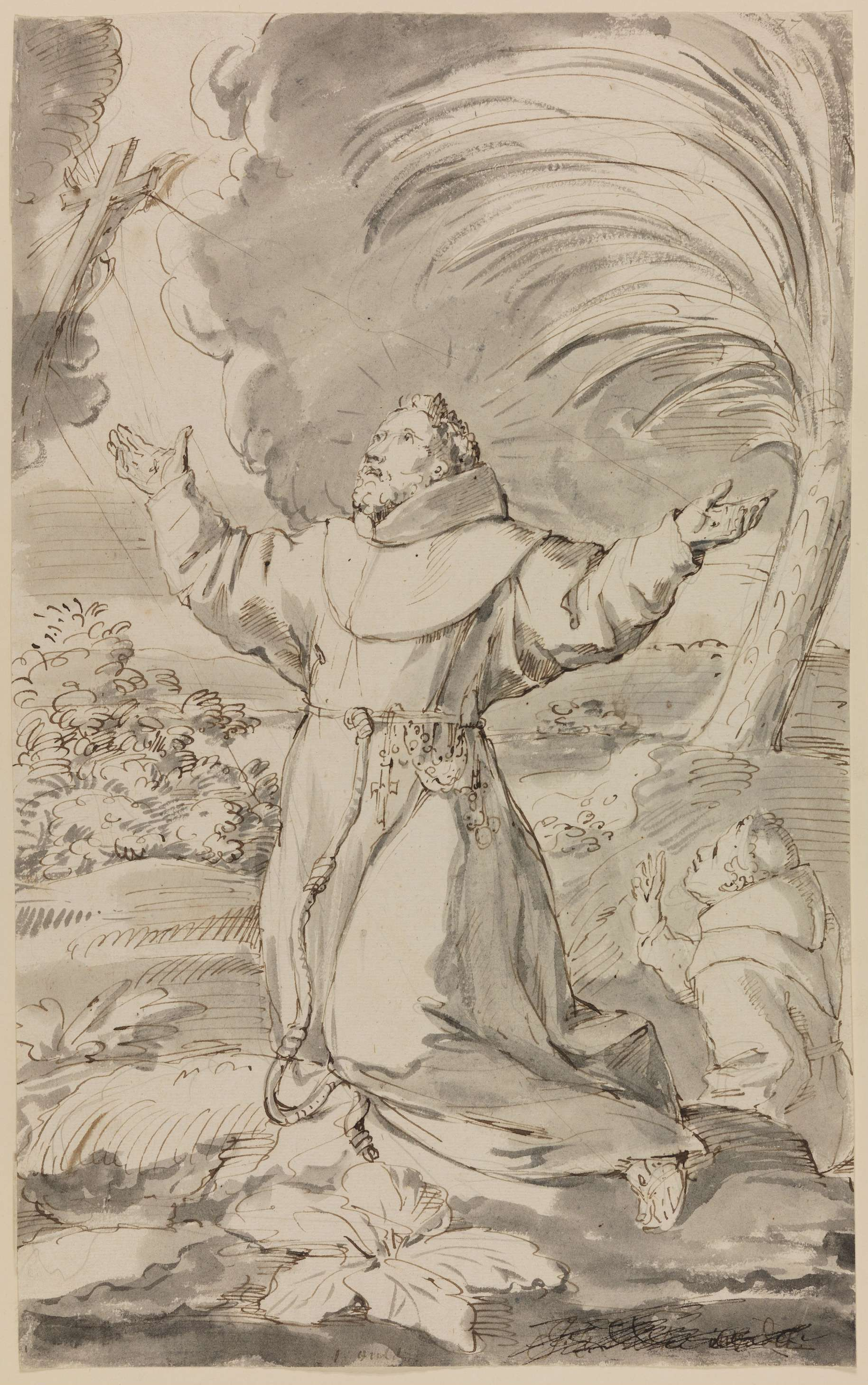
- St. Francis receives the stigmata by Jan Claudius de Cock
- Pronunciation: /ˈfrɑːnsɪs, ˈfræn-/
- Gender: Male
- Language: French, Haitian Creole, Latin
- Name day: October 4

Origin
- Language: Latin
- Meaning: Freeman
- Region of origin: Medieval Italy

Other names
- Related names: Franciscus, Francisco, Francesco, François, Franz, Franciszek, Francesc, Ferenc, Franco, Frans, Frank, Franklin, Frankie, Franky, Fritz

Francis is an English, French, German, Dutch and Scandinavian given name of Latin origin.

Francis is a name that has many derivatives in most European languages. A feminine version of the name in English is Frances, or (less commonly) Francine. (For most speakers, Francis and Frances are homophones or near homophones; a popular mnemonic for the spelling is "i for him and e for her".) The name Frank is a common diminutive for Francis, as is Frannie for Frances. Less common are the diminutives Fritz for Francis, and Franny and Fran for either Francis or Frances.

== History ==
The name has relatively unclear origins but is thought to mean "free". Notably, the Germanic peoples known as the Franks gave their name to France and their characteristic national weapon was the francisca, a throwing axe. Francesco ("Free man", "Frank", "Frenchman", in medieval Italian) was the name given to Saint Francis of Assisi (born Giovanni di Pietro di Bernardone) by his francophile father, whose wife, the mother of Francesco, was French, celebrating his trade with French merchants. Due to the renown of the saint, the name became widespread in Western Europe during the Middle Ages in its different versions (Francisco, François, etc.). However, it was not regularly used in Britain until the 16th century as Francis.

== Related names in other languages ==
Related names are common in other Western European languages, in countries that are (or were before the Reformation) Catholic. Other non-European languages have also adopted variants of the name. These names include:

- Arabic: فرانشيسكو (Farānshiskū), فرنسيس (Faransīs), فرانسيس (Farānsīs)
- Aragonese: Francho
- Armenian: Ֆրանցիսկոս (Franciskos)
- Asturian: Xicu
- Albanian: Françesku
- Alemannic German: Franz, Fränzi
- Basque: Frantzisko (male version), Frantziska or Pantxika (female version), Patxi or Pantxi (male diminutive of Frantzisko)
- Bavarian: Franze, Franzi, Franzl
- Belarusian: Францішак (Francišak)
- Bulgarian: Франциск (Frantsisk), Фружин (Fruzhin)
- Breton: Franseza, Frañsez, Fañch, Fañchig, Soaig, Saig
- Catalan: Francesc, Cesc, Cesco, Xesc, Xisco, Fran (male version); Francesca, Cisca, Xisca, Xesca, Fani, Francina (female version)
- Chinese: 弗朗西斯 (Fúlǎngxīsī), 方濟各 (Fāngjìgè), 法蘭西斯 (Fǎlánxīsī)
- Corsican: Francescu, Franciscu
- Croatian: Franjo, Frano, Frane, Fran (male version); Franciska, Franka, Franca, Franjica (female version)
- Czech: František, Františka (female version)
- Danish: Frans
- Dutch: Frans, Frank, Franciscus, Franciescus, Francieskus, Francis, Francies, Cies (Franciska, Francisca or Francien is used to signify the female version in the Netherlands)
- Esperanto: Francisko
- Estonian: Franciscus
- Filipino: Francisco, Francis, Franco, Kiko (diminutive of Francisco)
- Finnish: Frans, Fanni, Fransiscus, Ransu
- French: François, Francis, Francisque (rare) (male version); Françoise, France, Francine (female version)
- Galician: Francisco
- German: Franziskus, Franz, Franziska (female version)
- Greek: Fragiskos, Fragkiskos, Frangiskos, Frangkiskos, Frankiskos, (Φραγκίσκος), Frantzeskos (Φραντζέσκος), Frankiski (Φραγκίσκη), Frantzeska (Φραντζέσκα) (female version)
- Gujarati: ફ્રાન્સિસ (Phrānsis)
- Hawaiian: Palakiko
- Hindi: फ्रांसिस (Phrānsis)
- Hungarian: Ferenc, Feri, Franciska (female version)
- Icelandic: Frans
- Indonesian: Fransiskus, Fransiska (female version)
- Irish: Proinsias, Proinnsias [Francie], (all variants are valid for both males & females, rare for a female to adopt this name in Irish)
- Italian: Francesco, Franco, Fran, Ciccio, Cecco, Checco, Chicco (male version); Franca, Francesca, Cina, Cesca, Cecca (female version)
- Japanese: フランシス (Furanshisu) (for translation of English name), フランシスコ (Furanshisuko) (for translation of Christian name)
- Kannada: ಫ್ರಾನ್ಸಿಸ್ (Phrānsis)
- Konkani: Frask, Forso
- Korean: 프란시스 (Peuransiseu), 프란체스코 (Peurancheseuko)
- Latin: Franciscus
- Latvian: Francisks, Francis
- Lithuanian: Pranciškus, Pranas
- Lombard: Francesch
- Luxembourgish: Fränz
- Luo (Ke/Tz): Fransisko, Pransis
- Macedonian: Френсис (Frensis)
- Malayalam: പൊറിഞ്ചു (Porinchu/Porinju), പ്രാഞ്ചി Pranchi, Prenju, Frenju (popular amongst the Syro Malabar Catholics of Kerala. Porinchu being more common in the North around the Thrissur ArchDiocese, while Prenju and Frenju are more common in the South in the Kuttanad region of the Changanacherry ArchDiocese)
- Maltese: Franġisk, Frans
- Manx: Frank
- Neapolitan: Francesco (diminutives: Ciccio, Ciccillo)
- Norman: Françouais
- Norwegian: Frans, Franciskus
- Occitan: Francés
- Persian: فرانسیس (Frānsīs or Ferānsīs)
- Piedmontese: Fransesch
- Polish: Franciszek, (diminutives: Franek, Franio, Franuś) (male version), Franciszka, (diminutives: Franka, Frania) (female version)
- Portuguese: Francisco, Francisquinho, Chico, Chiquinho, Quico, Fran, Paco (diminutives) Francisca (female version), Francisquinha, Chica, Chiquinha, Quica (diminutives)
- Romanian: Francisc
- Russian: Франческо (Franchesko) for Italians, Франциск (Frantsisk) for Poles, Франц (Frants) for Germans, Франсуа (Fransua) for French
- Samogitian: Prancėškos
- Sardinian: Franchiscu, Franciscu, Frantziscu (male version); Franchisca, Francisca, Frantzisca (female version); Tzitzeddu/Tzitzedda, Tzischeddu/Tzischedda, Ciccìttu/Ciccìtta (diminutives)
- Scottish Gaelic: Frangag, Frangan, Prainnseas
- Serbian: Френсис, Franja, Franc, Francisko (rare in native usage), Slobodan (local version)
- Sicilian: Franciscu, Ciscu
- Slovak: František
- Slovene: Frančišek, Franček, France, Franci, Franc, Fran, Franko
- Spanish: Francisco, Paco, Pacho, Paquito, Curro, Fran, Quico, Pancho, Cisco, Chisco, Francisca (female version), Paca (female version), Pacha, Paqui or Paquita (female version)
- Swahili: Fransisko
- Swedish: Franciskus, Frans
- Tamil: பிரான்சிஸ் (Pirāṉcis)
- Telugu: ఫ్రాన్సిస్ (Phrānsis)
- Thai: ฟรานซิส (Frānsis̄)
- Turkish: Fransız, Fransuva
- Ukrainian: Франциск (Frantsysk), Франциска (Frantsyska, female version)
- Venetian: Francesco (Francesca, female version), Fransisco (Fransisca, female version), Francisco (Francisca, female version)
- Vietnamese: Phanxicô
- Welsh: Ffransis, Fransis (or Fransys)
- West Frisian: Fransiskus
- Yiddish: פראַנסיס (Fransis)

== List of people with the given name Francis ==
- Francis Atwoli (born 1939), Kenyan trade unionist
- Francis Alcantara (born 1992), professional tennis player from the Philippines
- Francis Alÿs (born 1959), Belgian-born, Mexico-based artist
- Francis Andersen (1925–2020), Australian scholar in the fields of biblical studies and Hebrew
- Francis Bacon (1561–1626), English philosopher, statesman, scientist, lawyer, jurist, author and pioneer of the scientific method
- Francis Bacon (artist) (1909–1992), Irish-born English artist
- Francis Baines (Jesuit) (1648–1710), English Jesuit
- Francis "Fritz" Barzilauskas (1920–1990), American National Football League player
- Francis Bernard (disambiguation), multiple people
- Francis Bohlen (1868–1942), American professor of law at the University of Pennsylvania Law School
- Francis Bouillon (born 1975), American-Canadian ice hockey player
- Francis S. Bowling (1916–1997), justice of the Supreme Court of Mississippi
- Francis Martin Patrick "Frankie" Boyle (born 1972), British stand-up comedian
- Francis Brewu (born 2006), American football defensive tackle
- Francis Brill (1836–1913), American farmer and politician
- Francis Buchholz (1954–2026), German bass guitarist
- Francis Cabrel (born 1953), French singer-songwriter, composer and guitarist
- Francis W. Capers (1839–1892), American educator and Confederate Army General
- Francis Capra (born 1983), American actor
- Sir Francis Chichester (1901–1972), British businessman, pioneering aviator and solo sailor
- Francis Collins (born 1950), American physician-scientist
- Francis Coquelin (born 1991), French professional footballer
- Francis Marion Crawford (1854–1909), American writer
- Francis Crick (1916–2004), British molecular biologist and winner of the 1962 Nobel Prize in Physiology or Medicine
- Francis Napier Denison (1866–1940), Canadian meteorologist, inventor, seismologist, and astronomer
- Francis Xavier Dercum (1858–1931), American physician
- Francis E. Donoghue (1872–1952), member of Illinois State House of Representatives
- Francis Donald Logan (1930–2022), American historian
- Francis Drake (1540–1596), English sea captain
- Francis Elliott (journalist), British journalist
- Francis Fentress (1873–1930), justice of the Tennessee Supreme Court
- Francis Scott Fitzgerald (1896–1940), American novelist and short story writer
- Francis B. Foley (1887–1973), American metallurgist
- Francis Fontaine (1845–1901), American poet and novelist
- Francis Ford Coppola (born 1939), American film-director, producer, and screenwriter
- Francis Fraschilla (born 1958), American basketball commentator and former college basketball coach
- Francis Fukuyama (born 1952), American political scientist
- Francis Galluppi (born 1988), American filmmaker
- Sir Francis Galton (1822–1911), British polymath
- Francois Xavier Gouraud (1877–1913), French physician and dietitian
- Francis Greenslade, Australian comedic actor
- Francis Griffith (disambiguation)
- Francis Grignon (born 1944), French politician
- Francis Grose, English antiquary, draughtsman, and lexicographer
- Francis C. Heitmeier (born 1950), American politician
- Francis Alick "Frankie" Howerd (1917–1992), British comedian and actor
- Francis Huré (1916–2021) French resistant, diplomat and writer
- Francis Davis Imbuga (1947–2012), Kenyan playwright
- Francis Irving, British computer programmer and activist for freedom of information
- Francis Katamba (born 1947), British linguist
- Francis Scott Key (1779–1843), writer of the American national anthem, "The Star-Spangled Banner"
- Francis Kilcoyne (died 1985), American President of Brooklyn College
- Francis Kobangoye (born 1990), Gabonese basketball player
- Francis Kompaon (born 1986), T46 Papua New Guinean athlete
- Francis Lai (1932–2018), French composer, noted for his film scores
- Francis Lawrence (born 1971), American filmmaker and producer
- Francis van Londersele (born 1953), French directeur sportif
- Francis Magalona (1964–2009), Filipino rapper, singer, songwriter, entrepreneur and television personality
- Francis Magee (born 1959), Irish actor
- Francis Magundayao (born 1999), Filipino actor and model
- Francis Manapul (born 1979), Canadian comic book artist and writer
- Francis March (1825–1911), American polymath, academic, philologist, and lexicographer
- Francis Marion, also known as the Swamp Fox, military officer in the American Revolutionary War
- Francis Marrash, Syrian scholar, publicist, writer, poet, and physician
- Francis Matthews (1927–2014), British actor, known for voicing Captain Scarlet
- Francis Maude, British Conservative politician
- Francis J. McCaffrey (1917–1989), American lawyer and politician from The Bronx, New York
- Francis J. McCaffrey Jr. (1902–1972), American lawyer and politician from Brooklyn, New York
- Francis McDonald (1891–1968), American actor
- Francis Méano (1931–1953), French international footballer
- Francis Davis Millet (1848–1912), American artist and RMS Titanic sinking victim
- Francis Molo (born 1994), New Zealand-Australian rugby league player
- Francis Orpen Morris (1810–1893), Anglo-Irish clergyman
- Francis Narh (born 1994), Ghanaian footballer
- Francis Ng (born 1961), Hong Kong actor and director
- Francis Ngannou (born 1986), Cameroonian-French mixed martial artist
- Francis Obikwelu (born 1978), retired Nigerian-born Portuguese sprinter
- Francis Omondi Ogolla (born 1962), Kenyan military general, Chief of Defence Forces.
- Francis Omaswa, Ugandan cardiovascular surgeon, academic and administrator
- Francis Ouimet (1893–1967), American amateur golfer
- Francis Owen (1886–1975), Canadian philologist and military officer
- Francis Owusu (born 1994), American football player
- Francis Paré (born 1987), Canadian-Belarusian professional ice hockey forward
- Francis Pasion (1978–2016), Filipino independent film and television drama director
- Francis E. Patterson (1821–1862), American military officer
- Francis Peacock (1723–1807), Scottish dance teacher and musician
- Francis "Frank" Pearson (1937–2003), British drag queen known as Foo Foo Lammar
- Francis Penrose (1817–1903), English architect, archaeologist, astronomer and sportsman rower
- Francis Petre (1847–1918), New Zealand-born architect based in Dunedin
- Francis Pollock (1876–1957), Canadian science fiction writer
- Francis Ponge (1899–1988), French essayist and poet
- Francis Poulenc (1899–1963), French composer and pianist
- Francis Pound (1948–2017), New Zealand art historian, curator and writer
- Francis J. Quirico (1911–1999), justice of the Massachusetts Supreme Judicial Court
- Francis Repellin (born 1969), French Nordic combined skier
- Sir Francis Ronalds (1788–1873), English scientist and inventor
- Francis Rosa (1920–2012), American sports journalist
- Francis Rossi (born 1949), British musician
- Francis Rundall (1908–1987), British diplomat
- Francis Saunderson (1754–1827), Anglo-Irish politician
- Francis Alexander Shields (1941–2003), American businessman and executive at Revlon in New York City
- Francis Albert "Frank" Sinatra (1915–1998), American singer, actor, and producer
- Francis Sultana, Maltese-born furniture and interior designer
- Francis Tolentino (born 1960), Filipino politician and senator
- Francis Tuttle (1920–1997), American educator
- Francis Uche Agabige, Nigerian politician, member of the Imo State House of Assembly
- Francis Valentino (born 1988), American musician
- Francis Webb (disambiguation), multiple people
- Francis Parker Yockey (1917–1960), American writer, lawyer and philosopher
- Francis Zamora (born 1977), Filipino politician, businessman, and basketball player

=== Aristocracy ===
- Francis I, Holy Roman Emperor (1708–1765), also Francis III, Duke of Lorraine

==== France ====
- Francis I of France, King of France (1494–1547)
- Francis II of France, King of France (1544–1560)
- Francis I of Brittany (1414–1450)
- Francis II of Brittany (1433–1488)
- Francis III of Brittany (1518–1536)
- Francis I, Duke of Lorraine (1517–1545)
- Francis II, Duke of Lorraine (1572–1632)

==== German-speaking countries ====
- Francis II, Holy Roman Emperor, also Francis I, Emperor of Austria (1768–1835)
- Franz, Duke of Bavaria (born 1933), called "Francis II" by Jacobite supporters

==== Iberian monarchies ====
- Prince Francis Joseph of Braganza (1878–1919), Infante of Portugal, 2nd son of Miguel II, legitimist claimant to the throne of Portugal
- Francisco de Asís, Duke of Cádiz, (1822–1902), Duke of Cádiz, King Consort of Spain to Queen Isabella II

==== Italy ====
- Francis I of the Two Sicilies (1777–1830)
- Francis II of the Two Sicilies (1836–1894)
- Francis IV, Duke of Modena (1779–1846)
- Francis V, Duke of Modena (1819–1875)

==== Hungary ====
- Francis I Rákóczi, Prince of Transylvania (1645–1676)
- Francis II Rákóczi, Duke of Hungary and Prince Transylvania (1676–1735)

==== Scandinavia ====
- Francis of Denmark (1497–1511), Prince of Denmark, Norway and Sweden

=== Religious figures ===
- Pope Francis (1936–2025)
- Francis of Assisi (1181/1182–1226), Italian Catholic friar and saint
- Francis de Sales (1567–1622), French Catholic bishop and saint
- Francis Xavier (1506–1552), Basque Catholic Jesuit missionary and saint
- Francis Borgia (1510-1572), Spanish Jesuit; third superior general of the Society of Jesus and saint.
- Francis Solanus (1549-1610), Spanish Franciscan missionary in South America and saint
- Francis George, OMI (1937–2015), cardinal and Archbishop of Chicago (1997–2014)
- Chico Xavier or Francisco Cândido Xavier, (1910–2002), popular Brazilian philanthropist and spiritist medium

== Fictional characters ==
- Francis "Frank" Castle, from Marvel Comics, also known as the Punisher
- Francis, the fictionalized persona of Boogie2988
- Francis the Talking Mule, featured in seven movies in the 1950s, voiced by Chill Wills
- Francis Underwood, from the Netflix original series House of Cards
- Francis Urquhart, lead character of the British political thriller House of Cards
- Francis, one of the protagonists from Left 4 Dead
- Francis "Frank" Sobotka, a character from The Wire
- Francis “Frank” Gallagher, a character from Shameless
- Francis, oldest child from Malcolm in the Middle

== See also ==
- Francis (surname)
- Francis (disambiguation)
