= Frayne =

Frayne or Frayn may refer to:

== People ==
- Alex Frayne, an Australian film director
- Bruce Frayne (1958), Australian sprinter
- David Frayne, a British Anglican priest, Provost of Blackburn
- George Frayne leader of Commander Cody and His Lost Planet Airmen
- Henry Frayne (athlete) (born 1990), Australian track and field athlete
- Henry Frayne (musician) (born 1965), Irish-American musician
- Hugh Frayne (1869–1934), American labor leader
- John G. Frayne (1894–1990) physicist and sound engineer
- Shawn Frayne inventor of the Windbelt device for converting wind power to electricity
- Steve Frayne (1982) is an English magician who performs under the stage-name of Dynamo
- Trent Frayne (1918–2012), Canadian sportswriter
- Hilary Weston née Frayne (1942–2025), Lieutenant Governor of Ontario
- Michael Frayn (1933), an English playwright and novelist
- Rebecca Frayn (1962), an English documentary film maker, screenwriter and novelist.

== Places ==
- Frayne College, a co-educational school located in Baranduda, Victoria.
- Ursula Frayne Catholic College, a private, co-educational school located southwest of Perth, Western Australia.

== Other ==
- Re: Fraynes (later The Fraynes) is a Canadian sports talk show television series.
- Re: Fraynes Frayne is also a Gaelic word meaning Ash Tree.

== See also ==
- Defreine. Frayne is an anglicised version of Defreine.
- Frain (disambiguation)
- Frane (disambiguation)
