= Frane =

Frane is a masculine Croatian given name and a variant of Franciscus. Notable people with the name include:

- Frane Adam (born 1948), Slovenian sociologist, editor and former dissident political activist
- Frane Bitunjac (born 1997), Croatian footballer
- Frane Bućan (born 1965), Croatian footballer
- Frane Bulić (1846–1934), Croatian priest, archeologist, and historian
- Frane Čačić (born 1980), Croatian footballer
- Frane Čirjak (born 1995), Croatian footballer
- Frane Despotović (born 1982), Croatian futsal player
- Frane Franić (1912–2007), Croatian Roman Catholic archbishop
- Frane Ikić (born 1994), Croatian footballer
- Frane Katalinić (1891–1976), Croatian rower
- Frane Lojić (born 1985), Croatian footballer
- Frane Matošić (1918–2007), Croatian footballer and coach
- Frane Milčinski (1914–1988), Slovenian poet, satirist, humorist, comedian, actor, writer and director
- Frane Nonković (1939–2023), Croatian water polo player
- Frane Petric or Franciscus Patricius (1529–1597), philosopher and scientist from the Republic of Venice
- Frane Poparić (born 1959), Croatian footballer
- Frane Selak (1929–2016), Croatian music teacher famous for surviving seven brushes with death
- Frane Šore Čelik (1918–1942), Croatian communist revolutionary
- Frane Vinko Golem (1938–2007), Croatian diplomat and politician
- Frane Vitaić (born 1982), Croatian footballer
- Frane Vladislavić (born 1994), Croatian footballer
- Frane Vojković (born 1996), Croatian footballer

== See also ==
- Fran (given name)
- Frano (given name)
- Franjo
- Frain (disambiguation)
- Franek
- Franex
- Franey
- Frayne (disambiguation)
- Ifrane
