= Frano =

Frano may refer to:

- Frånö, a village in Sweden
- Frano (given name), a Croatian masculine name
- Frano, Gilgit-Baltistan, a village in Pakistan
