= Ferenci (surname) =

Ferenci, Ferenczi, Ferenczy:

- Franz Ferenczy (born Friedemann, 1835–1881), German tenor
- István Ferenczy (1792–1856), Hungarian sculptor
- István "Stan" Ferenczi (born 1977), Hungarian footballer
- János Ferenczi (born 1991), Hungarian footballer
- Károly Ferenczy (1862–1917), Hungarian Impressionist painter
  - Béni Ferenczy (1890–1967), Hungarian sculptor, graphic artist
- Sándor Ferenczi (born Fränkel, 1873–1933), Hungarian psychoanalyst
- Zolton Ferency (1922–1993), American lawyer and political activist

== See also ==
- Ferenc
- Ferencsik (e.g. János Ferencsik, John Ferenzik)
