= Contemporary Linguistics: An Introduction =

Book edited by William O'Grady and Michael Dobrovolsky

- Author: William O'Grady, John Archibald, Mark Aronoff, Janie Rees-Miller, Michael Dobrovolsky, Francis Katamba (editors)
- Language: English
- Subject: linguistics
- Genre: textbook
- Publisher: Copp Clark Pitman, St. Martin's Press,
- Publication date: 1987 (1st ed), 2017 (7th ed)
- Media type: Print (hardcover)
- ISBN: 9781319074371

Contemporary Linguistics: An Introduction is a 1987 textbook edited by William O'Grady, Francis Katamba, John Archibald, Mark Aronoff, Janie Rees-Miller, Michael Dobrovolsky in which the authors provide an introduction to linguistics.

== Reception ==
The book was reviewed by Charles H. Ulrich, Stephen Adewole, Catherine Rudin and Laurel J. Brinton.
