= Francisc =

Francisc is the Romanian-language form of Francis. In other cases Francisc is the Romanianized form of the Hungarian name Ferenc.

Notable people with the name include:

- Francisc Hossu-Longin
- Francisc Rainer
- Francisc Șirato, Romanian painter and graphic artist
- Francisc Vaștag, Romanian boxer
