= Ferenc Farkas (Jesuit priest) =

Ferenc Farkas de Boldogfa

Personal details
- Born: 13 December 1742 Zalaboldogfa, county of Zala
- Died: 4 June 1807 (aged 64) Veszprém
- Profession: Jesuit priest, master canon of the Diocese of Veszprém

Ferenc Farkas de Boldogfa (13 December 1742 – 4 June 1807) was a Jesuit priest, parish priest of Nemesapáti, poet, and master canon of the Diocese of Veszprém.

== Life ==
Ferenc (in English: Francis) was born in Zalaboldogfa in the county of Zala, in the former Kingdom of Hungary as was a member of the ancient Roman Catholic Hungarian noble family Farkas de Boldogfa (in Hungarian: boldogfai Farkas család). His father was Ferenc Farkas de Boldogfa (1713-1770), jurist, landowner, vice-ispán of the county of Zala (alispán of Zala). His mother was the Hungarian noble lady Anna Mária Rosty de Barkócz (1722-1784), daughter of László Rosty de Barkócz, chief magistrate (Hungarian: főszolgabíró) of the Vas county and Mária Csapody de Zalalövő. One of his brothers was József Farkas de Boldogfa (1752-1809) Piarist priest, rector of the Piarist convent of Kolozsvár. The other brother from whom descends the family's two branches was János Farkas de Boldogfa (1741-1788), jurist, lawyer, landowner, Prothonotary of the county of Zala.

Ferenc started his studies at the age of 16 in Wien, when he entered into the Jesuit Order. He finished his studies of theology in Nagyszombat, and then he was the supervisor of the convict for a year. He celebrated his first mass on 18 June 1769 in Zélpuszta, in the family's chapel that his father built on their private Estate. After the Jesuit order was abolished in 1773, he became parish priest on Nemesapáti, an office which he occupied for about 30 years. During this time he managed to achieve the church's total restoration and the cemetery's replanning. In 1779 his mother Anna Rosty wrote her will, where she ordered that after her death, her other sons will assist economically Ferenc, in other he will have a comfortable retirement, as a member of the clergy he had no possessions. In 1794 he became the dean of the district of Nagykanizsa, and in 1803 master prebendary of Veszprém (Latin: "Reverendissimus C. E. W. Magister Canonicus"). He was also the director of the Saint Paul retired priests' house on Veszprém (Latin: Seminarii S. Pauli Emeritorim DD. Parrochorum Praefectus).

== Works ==
- Eucharisticon Benedicto Sajgho Ord. S. Bened. ad S. Martinum Archi Abbati, vota Deo secundem profitenti. Tyrnaviae, 1767. (Lyrai költemény.)
- Panegyricus D. Francisco Xav. dictus. Tyrnaviae, 1768.

== Bibliography ==
- Magyar Katolikus Lexikon. Főszerk. Diós István. Szerk. Viczián János. Bp., Szent István Társulat, 1993-.
- Veszprém megyei életrajzi lexikon. Főszerk. Varga Béla. Veszprém, Veszprém Megyei Önkormányzatok Közgyűlése, 1998.
- Zalai életrajzi kislexikon. Szerk. Gyimesi Endre. Zalaegerszeg, Zala Megyei Önkormányzati Közgyűlés, 1994.
- Zalai életrajzi kislexikon. 3. javított, bővített kiadás. Szerk. Fatér Bernadett, Horváth József, Kiss Gábor [és mások]. Zalaegerszeg, Deák Ferenc Megyei Könyvtár, 2005.
