= Franjo =

Franjo is a Croatian masculine given name. It is a cognate of Francis and Frank. See there for further etymological discussion.

There are different variations of the name Franjo, including Fran, Franek, Franko, and Frano.

In Croatia, the name Franjo was among the top ten most common masculine given names in the decades up to 1949.

Notable people with the name include:

- Franjo Arapović (born 1965), former Croatian basketball center
- Franjo Babić (1908–1945), Croatian writer and journalist
- Franjo Benzinger (1899–1991), Croatian pharmacist
- Franjo Bučar (1866–1946), Croatian writer and sports popularizer of Slovenian origin
- Franjo Dijak (born 1977), Croatian actor
- Franjo Džal (1906–1945), colonel in the Independent State of Croatia's air force
- Franjo Džidić (1939–2025), Bosnian football player and manager
- Franjo Frankopan (died 1543), Croatian nobleman and Latinist
- Franjo Fröhlich, Yugoslav Olympic fencer
- Franjo Glaser (1913–2003), Croatian football goalkeeper and football manager
- Franjo Gregurić (born 1939), Croatian politician, prime minister of Croatia July 1991 to September 1992
- Franjo Hanaman (1878–1941), Croatian inventor, engineer, and chemist
- Franjo Iveković (1834–1914), Croatian linguist and religious writer, university professor and rector of the University of Zagreb
- Franjo Jelačić (1746–1810), Croatian nobleman, a member of the House of Jelačić
- Franjo Klein (1828–1889), architect in the period of an early and mature historicism in Croatia
- Franjo Kluz (1913–1944), Yugoslav pilot of Bosnian origin, best known as one of the founders of the Partisan air force
- Franjo Komarica (born 1946), Bosnian Croat Roman Catholic prelate, the Bishop of Banja Luka since 1985
- Franjo Krežma (1862–1881), Croatian violinist and composer
- Franjo Kuhač (1834–1911), piano teacher, choral conductor, and comparative musicologist who studied Croatian folk music
- Franjo Kuharić (1919–2002), Cardinal of the Roman Catholic Church
- Franjo Kukuljević (1909–2002), Croatian tennis player
- Franjo Maixner (1841–1903), Croatian university professor and rector of the University of Zagreb
- Franjo Majetić (1923–1991), Croatian actor noted for his comedic roles
- Franjo Malgaj (1894–1919), Slovenian soldier, military leader and poet
- Franjo Marković (1845–1914), Croatian philosopher and writer
- Franjo Mihalić (1920–2015), long-distance runner and Olympic medallist
- Franjo Mraz (1910–1981), Croatian artist
- Franjo Punčec (1913–1985), Croatian tennis player
- Franjo Rački (1828–1894), Croatian historian, politician and writer
- Franjo Rupnik (1921–2000), Croatian football player
- Franjo Šeper (1905–1981), Croatian Cardinal of the Roman Catholic Church
- Franjo Šimić (1900–1944), Croatian colonel, and later general, in the Croatian Home Guard
- Franjo Šoštarić (1919–1975), Croatian football (soccer) player who competed internationally for Yugoslavia
- Franjo Tepurić (born 1990), Croatian football striker
- Franjo Tuđman (1922–1999), Croatian historian, writer and politician the first president of Croatia
- Franjo Vlašić (1766–1840), Croatian general and ban
- Franjo Vladić (1950–2024), Bosnian Croat footballer who played for Yugoslavia national football team
- Franjo Wölfl (1918–1987), Croatian footballer
- Ivan Franjo Jukić (1818–1857), writer from Bosnia and Herzegovina, one of the founders of Bosnian modernism
- Vanja Udovičić (born 1982), born as Franjo Udovičić, Serbian water polo player and Minister of Youth and Sports

== See also ==
- Frano (given name)
- Frane
- Fran (given name)
