= Frano (given name) =

Frano is a Croatian masculine given name.

Notable people with the name include:

- Frano Bakarić, Croatian sprinter
- Frano Botica, New Zealand-Croatian rugby coach and player
- Frano Getaldić-Gundulić, Ragusan writer and politician
- Frano Gundulić, Ragusan nobleman
- Ivan Frano Jukić, Bosnian cleric and writer
- Frano Klasnetić, Croatian futsal player
- Frano Kršinić, Croatian sculptor
- Frano Kršinić (biologist), Croatian marine biologist
- Frano Lasić, Croatian actor and singer
- Frano Menegello Dinčić, Yugoslav artist
- Frano Mlinar, Croatian football player
- Frano Radman, Dalmatian cleric and writer
- Frano Supilo, Croatian politician and journalist
- Frano Vićan, Croatian water polo player
- Frano Vodopivec, Croatian cinematographer
- Frano Zubić, Bosnian cleric

== See also ==
- Franjo
- Frane
- Fran (given name)
