= Francis Webb =

Francis Webb may refer to:

- Francis Webb (engineer) (1836–1906), British engineer
- Francis Webb (poet) (1925–1973), Australian poet
- Francis Webb (writer) (1735–1815), English writer
- Francis Cornelius Webb (1826–1873), English physician and medical writer

== See also ==
- Francis Webb Sheilds (1820–1906), Australian civil engineer
