= Popara (surname) =

Popara (Serbian Cyrillic: Попара) is a Bosnian and Serbian surname. Notable people with the surname include:

- Pavle Popara (born 1987), Serbian footballer
- Nikola Popara (born 1992), Bosnian footballer

== See also ==
- Poparić
