= Ferenci =

Ferenci, Ferenczi, or Ferenczy may refer to:

- Ferenci (surname), a Hungarian surname
- 11584 Ferenczi, an asteroid
- Ferenci, Karlovac County, a village near Ozalj, Croatia
- Ferenci, Istria County, a village near Vižinada, Croatia
