= June Callwood =

Canadian journalist, author and social activist (1924 – 2007)

- Born: June Rose Callwood; June 2, 1924; Chatham, Ontario, Canada
- Died: April 14, 2007 (aged 82); Toronto, Ontario, Canada
- Occupations: Author; Journalist; Activist
- Notable credit(s): Order of Canada; Order of Ontario; Toronto Arts Foundation Lifetime Achievement Award; Canadian News Hall of Fame inductee
- Spouse: Trent Frayne
- Children: Jill Frayne; Brant Frayne; Jesse Frayne; Casey Frayne

June Rose Callwood, CC OOnt (June 2, 1924 – April 14, 2007) was a Canadian journalist, author and social activist. She wrote articles and columns written for national newspapers and magazines, including Maclean's and Chatelaine. She also founded a number of charities.

== Childhood ==
Callwood was born in Chatham, Ontario, and grew up in nearby Belle River, with her younger sister Jane. Her mother was the daughter of a Métis bootlegger and her father was the son of a magistrate. Her parents' marriage was deeply troubled, and while she was shown affection by her grandparents, her family was desperately poor, moving at night from one house to another. Her father left the family and she was forced to drop out of high school to earn an income.

== Career ==
Callwood began her journalism career at her high school, Brantford Collegiate Institute, where she was editor of the school paper. She later worked for the Brantford Expositor as a cub reporter and received 50¢ per week for assorted writing and proofreading assignments. During this time, in the midst of World War II, June was earning $7.50 a week, half of which she gave to her mother for rent. In 1942, she was offered a job with The Globe and Mail and moved to Toronto. She married journalist Trent Frayne two years later, but continued to use her own surname because The Globe and Mail at that time did not employ married women.

Callwood left The Globe and Mail to raise a family but later resumed her career by becoming a freelance journalist, writing books and magazine pieces, many for Maclean's. In the spring of 1957, she interviewed Elvis Presley in Toronto, during the singer's first tour of Canada. Soon after, she ghost-wrote autobiographies for such prominent Americans as broadcaster Barbara Walters, film director Otto Preminger and Dr. Charles William Mayo. Frayne and Callwood also hosted the CBC Television talk show The Fraynes in the 1954-55 television season.

Callwood later entered television journalism, hosting the series In Touch on CBC Television from 1975 to 1978. She also hosted two series, National Treasure and Caregiving with June Callwood, for Vision TV.

In 2004, Callwood went public about her battle with cancer. She refused treatment and continued to be active until she succumbed to the disease in the morning of April 14, 2007. Callwood was last seen on TV on April 2, 2007, in the CBC show The Hour, interviewed by George Stroumboulopoulos.

A biography, written by Anne Dublin and entitled June Callwood: A Life of Action, was published in March 2007.

== Activism ==
Callwood's career was marked by a strong concern for social justice, especially on issues affecting children and women. She became one of Canada's most famous social justice activists, founding or co-founding over 50 Canadian social action organizations including youth and women's hostels. She founded Casey House (a Toronto hospice for people with AIDS), Jessie's (now called Jessie's: The June Callwood Centre for Young Women), PEN Canada, the Canadian Civil Liberties Association, and Feminists Against Censorship. She was also involved in the Digger House, a shelter for homeless youth, and Nellie's, one of Canada's first shelters for women in crisis, and was a key spokesperson for civil liberties for gay people in the aftermath of Operation Soap.

In 1968, she was arrested and briefly spent time in the Don Jail after siding with homeless Yorkville children in a battle with police. In 1991, while on the board at Nellie's, she was accused of racism. "Nobody asked what happened," says Callwood, "you didn't have to do anything in those days. You just had to be in the way of legitimate rage. It woke people up...but a few of us got our heads kicked in." While some did not stand up for her, others defended her, and she was later vindicated with a Harmony Award in 2003 for work against discrimination. Callwood later became a spokesperson for the Campaign Against Child Poverty.

== Honours ==
In 1978, Callwood was made a member of the Order of Canada. She was promoted to Officer in 1985, and promoted again to Companion in 2000. In 1988, she was awarded the Order of Ontario. She was inducted into the Etobicoke Hall of Fame in 1992.

In 2004, the City of Toronto announced that it would name a street in Callwood's honour. Callwood requested that an existing street not be renamed for her, and specified that it be a new or currently unnamed street near a school or a playground. June Callwood Way is in the neighbourhood of Queen Street East and Broadview Avenue.

June Callwood was named Toronto Humanist of the Year 2004 by The Humanist Association of Toronto.

In July 2005, a Toronto park was named after Callwood. A professorship in social justice was also established at Victoria College, University of Toronto in her honour. In 2008, Premier Dalton McGuinty declared June 2 of every year to be June Callwood Day.

In 2011, June Rose Callwood Public School, located at 84 Edward Street in St. Thomas, Ontario, was named in her honour.

Callwood was inducted into the Chatham-Kent Cultural Hall of Fame for her contributions to the literary arts in 2022, as part of its inaugural class.

== Personal life ==
Callwood and Frayne had two daughters and two sons. The daughters are authors Jesse and Jill Frayne, and the elder son is Brant Frayne. The second son and youngest child, Casey Frayne, was killed on April 19, 1982, when he was 20 years old, by a drunk driver on Highway 401 as he returned home from Queen's University. This incited her neighbour John Bates to start a campaign against drunk driving, which resulted in the founding of Citizens Against Impaired Driving (CAID) which is now MADD Canada, the Canadian branch of Mothers Against Drunk Driving.

Callwood withdrew from the public due to the allegations of racism, and during this period, at age 70 Callwood obtained her pilot's licence and maintained the licence throughout her life. "I wanted something to get above the muck and I guess I did it more literally than most people", she said.

Callwood generally shied away from organized religion. "I am missing a formal religion, but I am not without a theology, and my theology is that kindness is a divinity in motion," she said in a 2005 speech delivered as the first lecture in the June Callwood Professorship in Social Justice at Victoria College at the University of Toronto.

== Selected works ==
- Love, Hate, Fear and Anger — 1964
- Canadian Women and the Law — 1974
- The Law Is Not for Women — 1976
- Portrait of Canada — 1981
- Emma: A True Story of Treason — 1984
- Emotions — 1986
- Twelve Weeks in Spring — 1986
- Jim: A Life With AIDS — 1988
- The Sleepwalker — 1990
- Portrait of Canada — 1991
- June Callwood's National Treasures — 1994
- Trial Without End: A Shocking Story of Women and AIDS — 1995
- The Man Who Lost Himself: The Terry Evanshen Story — 2000 (about CFL player Terry Evanshen)

== Archives ==
There is a June Callwood fonds at Library and Archives Canada. The archival reference number is R5274, former archival reference number MG31-K24. It covers the date ranges 1916 to 2003. The fonds contains 14.6 meters of textual records and a variety of other media.
