= Pranciškus =

Pranciškus is a given name. Notable people with the name include:

- Pranciškus Būčys (1872–1951), titular bishop of the Eastern Catholic Church
- Pranciškus Baltrus Šivickis (1882–1968), Lithuanian zoologist
- Pranciškus Smuglevičius, Polish-Lithuanian draughtsman and painter
- Pranciškus Tupikas (1929–2015), Lithuanian politician

== See also ==
- Francis (given name)
