= Ferenc =

- Gender: masculine
- Language: Hungarian
- Name day: October 4, December 3

Other gender
- Feminine: Franciska

Origin
- Language: Latin
- Meaning: Free man
- Region of origin: Medieval Italy

Other names
- Nicknames: Feri, Ferkó
- Cognate: Francis
- Anglicisation: Francis

Ferenc (Hungarian pronunciation: [ˈfɛrɛnt͡s]) is a given name of Hungarian origin. It is a cognate of Francis, Francisco, Francesco, François, Frank and Franz. People with the name include:

- Ferenc Batthyány (1497–1566), Hungarian magnate and general
- Ferenc Bene (1944–2006), Hungarian footballer
- Ferenc Berényi (1927–2004), Hungarian artist
- Ferenc Bessenyei (1919–2004), Hungarian actor
- Ferenc Csik (1913–1945), Hungarian swimmer
- Ferenc Deák (politician) (1803–1876), Hungarian statesman, Minister of Justice
- Ferenc Deák (footballer) (1922–1998), Hungarian footballer
- Ferenc Erkel (c. 1810–1893), Hungarian composer and conductor
- Ferenc Farkas de Boldogfa (1713–1770), Hungarian nobleman
- Ferenc Farkas (Jesuit priest) (1742–1807), Hungarian Jesuit priest
- Ferenc Farkas (Zala county auditor) (1838–1908), Hungarian nobleman
- Ferenc Farkas (1905–2000), Hungarian composer
- Ferenc Fekete (1914–1981), Hungarian cinematographer
- Ferenc Fricsay (1914–1963), Hungarian conductor
- Ferenc Gyurcsány (born 1961), Hungarian Prime Minister
- Ferenc Karinthy (1921–1992), Hungarian writer and translator
- Ferenc Kölcsey (1790–1838), Hungarian poet, literary critic, orator, politician
- Ferenc Koncz (1959–2020), Hungarian politician
- Ferenc Liszt (1811–1886), Hungarian composer and conductor known as Franz Liszt
- Ferenc Mádl (1931–2011), Hungarian legal scholar, politician, professor
- Ferenc Mohácsi (1929–2025), Hungarian sprint canoeist
- Ferenc Molnár (1878–1952), Hungarian author
- Ferenc Móra (1879–1934), Hungarian novelist, journalist, and museologist
- Ferenc Nádasdy (1555–1604), Hungarian nobleman, soldier, politician
- Ferenc Paragi (1953–2016), Hungarian track and field athlete
- Ferenc Puskás (1927–2006), Hungarian footballer
- Ferenc Rados (1934–2025), Hungarian pianist
- Ferenc Szekeres (born 1947), Hungarian long-distance runner
- Ferenc Szálasi (1897–1946), Hungarian politician, the leader of the Arrow Cross Party
- Ferenc Weisz (1885–1943), Hungarian footballer
- Paul Ferenc, fictional character in Far Cry 2
- Alžbeta Ferencová (born 1991), Slovak musician, actress and model

== Ferencz ==
Ferencz is an old spelling of "Ferenc":

- Ferenc Gyulay (1799–1868), Austrian-Hungarian nobleman
- Ferencz Jámbor (born 1973)
- Ferenc József, Prince Koháry de Csábrág et Szitnya (1767–1826), Hungarian nobleman
- Steven (István) Ferencz Udvar-Házy, billionaire businessman
- Ben Ferencz (1920–2023), American lawyer
- István Ferencz (born 1944), Hungarian architect
- Károly Ferencz (1913–1984), Hungarian Olympic sport wrestler
- László Ferencz (born 1961), Hungarian chemical engineer
- Réka Ferencz (born 1989), birthname of Romanian biathlete Réka Forika

== See also ==
- Ferenci (disambiguation)
