= Frain (name) =

Frain is a surname. Notable people with the surname include:

- David Frain (born 1962), an English footballer
- Irène Frain (born 1950), French writer
- James Frain (born 1968), an English actor
- John Frain (born 1968), an English footballer, brother of Peter
- Peter Frain, an English footballer, brother of John
- Rose Frain, a British artist
- Todd Frain (born 1962), an American football player
- Travis D. Frain (born 1998), English political advocate

== See also ==
- Darren DeFrain (born 1967), an American author
