= Fran Stallings =

American storyteller

- Born: Frances Karen Oguss; August 28, 1943 (age 82); Far Rockaway, New York
- Occupation: Storyteller
- Years active: 1982–present
- Partner(s): Gordon Stallings (1968–present; married)
- Children: 2

Fran Stallings is an American storyteller for people of all ages. She has performed at numerous national and international storytelling festivals, in schools and libraries, and on the radio. She performs primarily folktales from around the world. She has authored several audio recordings and books of stories and songs.

Stallings's storytelling style is noted for its ability to entrance listeners, a phenomenon she wrote about for The National Storytelling Journal in 1988. She teaches teachers to use stories in the classroom to hold students' attention while conveying lessons.

== Biography ==
Fran grew up in New York City but spent much of her childhood in Lancaster, Ohio, to which she attributes her Midwestern rather than New York accent. She began storytelling while caring for her four younger siblings; her mother was concerned that their imaginations would be stunted by growing up with television.

She attended Wellesley College partly on the basis of their dance program but majored in biology after a campus job doing illustrations of botanical specimens aroused her interest in plant physiology, and a professor used storytelling in his lectures to interest her in chemistry She then attended the University of Wisconsin as a National Science Foundation Fellow in botany, studying cell differentiation in fungus. She met her husband, Gordon, when they were both in their senior year of undergraduate school. She worked as an assistant professor at a branch of Kent State University from 1970-1973 before following Gordon's work to Ann Arbor, Michigan and then to Bartlesville, Oklahoma. Finding no market for her botanical skills in Bartlesville, she pursued her interest in folktales and began storytelling in the classroom in 1978, while her two children were in elementary school. Her biology background and teaching experience both resurfaced as a thread in her storytelling: as "EarthTeller" she teaches science through stories.

Fran's scientific background (and young children) got her involved as a group leader in Bartlesville's La Leche League, and her connections there led her to local organizing to pass the Equal Rights Amendment (ERA). When the ERA did not pass, and a spinal problem in 1980 caused her to spend most of a summer in bed, she picked up the phone and helped to organize a women's shelter, a gifted education program, and what became the Bartlesville Women's Network.

By 1985, while still recovering from spinal surgery, Fran began working as an artist-in-residence for the Oklahoma State Arts Council. In 1993 Fran visited Japan with her family and met Hiroko Fujita, a storyteller from Fukushima Prefecture, and the two began a professional partnership, touring the U.S. twelve times and Japan seven times from 1995-2008. Their partnership was awarded the International Storybridge Award in 2003.

In March, 2009, Fran won the Tejas Storytelling Association's John Henry Faulk award for "the person who has contributed the most toward the art of storytelling in the Southwest."

== Notable performance venues ==
- Vancouver Storytelling Circle
- Charlotte Folk Festival (North Carolina)
- WinterTales (Oklahoma City)
- Tulsey Town Festival (Tulsa)
- Texas Storytelling Festival
- OKon and RocKon Science Fiction Conventions
- SunFest Storytelling Festival (Bartlesville, Oklahoma)
- Mountain Laurel Autoharp Gathering (MLAG) (Shippensburg University of Pennsylvania)
- Ozark Folk Center (Mountain View, Arkansas)
- Texas Conference on Storytelling

== Publications ==
- Folktales from the Japanese Countryside, a collection of 46 of Hiroko Fujita's traditional stories edited by Fran Stallings.
- Look At That Mouse! Diversions and Stories with a Mouse Puppet by Fran Stallings with Ken Oguss. Prairie-Fire Productions, 2002.
- Stories to Play With: Kids' Tales Told with Puppets, Paper, Toys, and Imagination by Hiroko Fujita, adapted & edited by Fran Stallings. Little Rock AR: August House, 1999. ISBN 0-87483-553-4.
- Hiroko Fujita's FAVORITE STORIES Volume 1 by Hiroko Fujita, adapted & edited by Fran Stallings. (with English translation)
- Hiroko Fujita's FAVORITE STORIES Volume 2 by Hiroko Fujita, adapted & edited by Fran Stallings. (with English translation)
- Stories for Beginners #1 & 2. Tokyo: Isseisha Press, 1999. ISBN 4-87077-154-3 and 4-87077-157-8.
- World Tales. Tokyo: Isseisha Press, 2001. ISBN 4-87077-166-7.

== Recordings ==
- Cat o' Nine Tales: Stories and Songs about Cats. with Gail Huggett and Moby Anderson
- TRAVELING TALES Volume 1: and TRAVELING TALES Volume 2:
- Interaction: Storytelling with Music featuring the story "Shingebiss and the North Wind"
- "Crane's Gratitude" and other tales of animal wit and wisdom
