= Cesco =

Cesco may refer to:

== People ==
=== Given name ===
- Cesco Agterberg (born 1975), Dutch soccer coach
- Cesco Baseggio (1897–1971), Italian actor

=== Surname ===
- Carlos Ulrrico Cesco (died 1987), Argentine astronomer
- Mario R. Cesco, astronomer and son of C. U. Cesco

== Other uses ==
- 1571 Cesco, a main-belt asteroid

== See also ==
- Francis (given name)
