= Franciska =

- Gender: feminine
- Language: Hungarian
- Name day: March 8

Other gender
- Masculine: Ferenc

Origin
- Language: Latin

Other names
- Nickname: Franci
- Anglicisation: Frances
- Related names: Fanni, Franci

Franciska is a given name. It is a feminine form of the Latin Franciscus. Notable people with the name include:

- Franciska Clausen (1899–1986), Danish painter
- Franciska Farkas (born 1984), Hungarian actress
- Franciska Gaal (1903–1973), Hungarian cabaret artist and film actress
- Franciska Grassalkovich (1732–1779), Hungarian noblewoman
- Franciska Győry (born 1940), Hungarian actress
- Franciska Jansen, Dutch track and field athlete
- Franciska Königsegg-Aulendorfi, German noblewoman
- Franciska Nagy (born 1943), Hungarian writer
- Franciska Sontag (1789–1866), stage actor
- Franciska Töröcsik (born 1990), Hungarian actress

== See also ==
- Franziska (given name)
- Francis (given name)
