= William O'Grady (linguist) =

American linguist (born 1952)

- Born: 1952 (age 73–74)

Academic background
- Education: University of Prince Edward Island (B.A); Université Laval (M.A); Harvard University (M.Ed); University of Chicago (Ph.D.)

Academic work
- Institutions: University of Hawaiʻi at Mānoa

William Delaney O'Grady (born 1952) is a professor in linguistics at the University of Hawaiʻi at Mānoa. His research focuses on syntactic theory, language acquisition, Koreanic languages and heritage language. He is also affiliated with the Center for Korean Studies at the University of Hawai‘i at Mānoa as a full member and the Island Studies Program at the University of Prince Edward Island as an adjunct professor and graduate faculty member.

== Notable works ==
O'Grady's work on syntactic theory and language acquisition focuses on emergentism, the idea that complex systems are best understood by investigating the interaction of more basic forces and propensities. He has written many articles about emergentism and its approaches to language for the general reader, including "An Emergentist Approach to Syntax" (2010), which summarizes the emergentist approach to the study of sentence formation. Many of the points raised in this article were developed in more detail in his book Syntactic Carpentry: An Emergentist Approach to Syntax (2005), in which O'Grady shows how the defining properties of various core syntactic phenomena follow from the operation of a linear, efficiency-driven processor.

In his article "Emergentism" O'Grady hypothesizes that there is a need for an emergentist theory of grammar to understand how language is acquired and shaped by people and describes how this is in opposition to the linguistic nativism theory of universal grammar. He stated in another article, "My position with respect to UG is that it does not exist."

He co-authored Contemporary Linguistics: An Introduction (1987), a book that emphasizes the contemporary practice of linguistic analysis and introduced the reader to the fundamentals of linguistics.

O'Grady's research into Korean includes work on case-related phenomena as well as processing and acquisition. He has as co-authored several books on the subject of Korean vocabulary including the Handbook of Korean Vocabulary: A Resource for Word Recognition and Comprehension (1996), The Sounds of Korean: A Pronunciation Guide (2003), and the Handbook of Korean Vocabulary (1996). In 2019 he co-authored Jejueo: The Language of Korea's Jeju Island (2019); the Jeju language is a distinct dialect of Korean and is classified as a critically endangered language by UNESCO, and the book aimed to help establish the importance of Jejueo to the cultural and linguistic heritage of not only Jeju Island but the entire Korean peninsula.

O'Grady has authored or co-authored various articles on heritage language. In "Case in Heritage Korean" (2018) he focuses on children who grow up exposed to Korean at home but speak mainly English in other settings and how this affects the learning of case markers. O'Grady further explores heritage language and the emergentist approach in language acquisition in the article "An Emergentist Perspective on Heritage Language Acquisition" (2011).

== Bibliography ==
- O'Grady William (1981). The Quebec Problem: An Inquiry Into the Ethics of Sovereignty and Secession. Borealis Press
- O'Grady, Dobrovolsky, Katamba (1987). Contemporary Linguistics: An Introduction, Toronto: Copp Clark Pitman Ltd
- O'Grady William (1987). Principles of Grammar and Learning. Chicago: University of Chicago Press
- O'Grady William (1991). Categories and Case: The Sentence Structure of Korean. Philadelphia: John Benjamins Publishing Company
- Choo and O'Grady (1996). Handbook of Korean Vocabulary: A Resource for Word Recognition and Comprehension. Hawaii: University of Hawaii Press
- O'Grady William (1997). Syntactic Development. Chicago: University of Chicago Press
- O'Grady William (2005). Contemporary Linguistic Analysis Study Guide New York: Pearson Education Canada Publishing
- O'Grady William (2005). How Children Learn Language. Cambridge: Cambridge University Press
- O'Grady William (2005). Syntactic Carpentry: An Emergentist Approach to Syntax. Philadelphia: Routledge
- O'Grady, Aronoff, Archibald, Rees-Miller (2009). Study Guide for Contemporary Linguistics. New York: Bedford/St. Martin's
- Macwhinney and O'Grady (eds) (2015). The Handbook of Language Emergence. New Jersey: John Wiley & Sons
- Yang, Yang, O'Grady (2019). Jejueo: The Language of Korea's Jeju Island. Hawaii: University of Hawaii Press
