= Frane Šore Čelik =

Drug Frane Šore Komandir
- Frane Šore
- Born: July 14, 1918; Donji Seget, Kingdom of Dalmatia, Austro-Hungarian Empire
- Died: Jun 12, 1942 (aged 23); Vidimlije, Italian occupation zone of the Independent State of Croatia
- Burial place: Konacvine cemetery, Seget Donji, Croatia
- Military career
- Allegiance: Kingdom of Yugoslavia
- Branch: Royal Yugoslav Navy, Yugoslav / Croatian partisans
- Service years: 1937-1942
- Rank: Unknown
- Nicknames: Čelik, Bajuba
- Unit: Livno partisan squad
- Commands: Company of Livno partisan squad, Platoon of Livno partisan squad (executive officer)

Frane Šore (July 14, 1918 – June 12, 1942), known under the nom de guerre Čelik (lit. 'Steel'), was a Croatian communist revolutionary, Partisan Commanding officer and organizer of the anti-fascist uprising in the village of Donji Seget near Trogir.

== Biography ==
Frane Šore Čelik was born in the village of Donji Seget near Trogir, at the time Kingdom of Dalmatia, Austro-Hungarian Empire, into a family of a fishermen. He was the son of Marko and Ika, born Vukman Ilak. He completed primary school at his place of birth, where he spent his childhood and youth.

Čelik was an early member of the youth revolutionary movement, which included members of the League of Communists of Yugoslavia (KPJ); Zvonko Prlenda a bakery worker, Petar Lozovina, and Tadija Mihanović from Žrnovnica. In mid-1934, he became a member of the League of Communist Youth of Yugoslavia (SKOJ), and was elected soon after as secretary of the local organization of the SKOJ of Seget Donji. In 1936 he became a volunteer for the Spanish Civil War, where he did not arrive due to poor connections and police burglary. In 1936, under the directive of Party, he went to Stobreč and then to Kaštel Kambelovac, where he gathered the advanced youth and founded the organization of the SKOJ. In 1937, he became a member of the national branch of Communist Party of Yugoslavia, the newly-formed Communist Party of Croatia, and since then was more engaged in a revolutionary life. He developed his own ideological and political education by reading Marxist literature.

In 1937, he went to Šibenik to serve in the regular military of the Kingdom of Yugoslavia. He continued with his revolutionary work in the military, where he founded active communist cells in the military unit, scouting command. The military command saw his revolutionary action, and he was mistreated and physically punished, and was sentenced by punishment to a navy ship Jadran, where he was also punished.

After serving the military deadline, he returned to his village and continued his revolutionary work. In 1938 a local reader Seljačka sloga was established in the Špika Bunde house in the village and he was its first president. He was included in the forming of the party cell of KPH – Donji Seget, founded in August 1939. At the time of the capitulation of the kingdom of Yugoslavia, he found himself a reservoir on the battery of Novica on Drvenik Veliki, from where he brought a lot of ammunition and weapons.

After the occupation of the Kingdom of Yugoslavia, and on the basis of the Roman Treaties, the establishment of Italian monarchist-fascist authorities in his native Seget, he was actively involved in the gathering of weapons and ammunition in preparation for the uprising and resistance against the occupier. He participated in the organization of the "shock group" in Seget Donji, which organized and performed the first diversion actions, such as the demolition of telephone and telegraph poles in Marina and Gornji Seget, and in cooperation with the Trogir communists, the demolition of the HDŽ train in Labin Dread, which carried oil for the Ustasha garrison in Sinj. After the arrival of an occupier, under the party directive, he went into an illegal secret life. Italian police and authorities searched for him on the basis of local spies' testimony, such as Filip Bilota, whose name is mentioned in Italian documents. The Carabinieri arrested Čelik in August 1941, in Seget Donji; he was released after several days' detention with the obligation to report back to their office in Trogir.

He departed from the partisans unit on April 24, 1942, where he was assigned to the Livno partisan squad, where he was soon appointed as an exemplary fighter and was assigned as platoon commander and then deputy commander of the company. In the battles in which he participated, he emerged as an unforgiving fighter. He attempted suicide on June 12, 1942, in the village of Vidimlije near Glamoč, while fighting with Chetniks, at the time the place was in the Italian occupation zone of the Independent State of Croatia.

== Legacy ==
His name was adopted by the then High Economic School in Seget Donji, the Youth Cultural Arts Society and a street in Seget Donji. On August 15, 1979, a memorial was constructed; a work by Split sculptor Mirko Ostoja was placed in front of the then-Seget Donji High School.
