= Frain =

Frain may refer to:

- Frain (name), a surname
- Frain, Vosges, a commune in France
- Vranov nad Dyjí, a market town in the Czech Republic, also known by its German name, Frain

== See also ==
- Frane
