= Proinsias =

Proinsias is a given name, the Irish equivalent of Francis. Notable people with the name include:

== People ==
- Proinsias De Rossa (born 1940), Irish Labour Party politician
- Proinsias Mac Airt (1922–1992), Irish republican activist
- Proinsias Mac an Bheatha (1910–1990), Irish language activist and writer
- Proinsias Mac Aonghusa (1933–2003), Irish journalist, writer, TV presenter, and campaigner
- Proinsias Mac Cana (1926–2004), academic and Celtic scholar
- Proinsias Ó Doibhlin (1660–1724), Irish Franciscan friar, poet, and scribe
- Proinsias Ó Maonaigh (1922–2006), Irish fiddler

== Characters ==
- Proinsias Cassidy, character from the Preacher comic book series

== See also ==
- Francis (given name)
- List of Irish-language given names
