= Poparić =

Poparić (Serbian Cyrillic: Попарић) is a surname. Notable people with this surname include:

- Frane Poparić (born 1959), a Croatian footballer
- Milan Poparić (born 1978), a Bosnia and Herzegovina criminal
