= Frånö =

- Location within Västernorrland Location within Sweden
- Coordinates: 62°54′N 17°50′E
- Country: Sweden
- Province: Ångermanland
- County: Västernorrland County
- Municipality: Kramfors Municipality

Area
  - Total: 2.48 km^{2} (0.96 sq mi)

Population (31 December 2010)
  - Total: 640
  - Density: 259/km^{2} (670/sq mi)
- Time zone: UTC+1 (CET)
  - Summer (DST): UTC+2 (CEST)
- Climate: Dfc

Frånö was a locality situated in Kramfors Municipality, Västernorrland County, Sweden with 640 inhabitants in 2010. Since 2015, it is included in the urban area of Kramfors.
