= Francis Webb (writer) =

English writer and minister

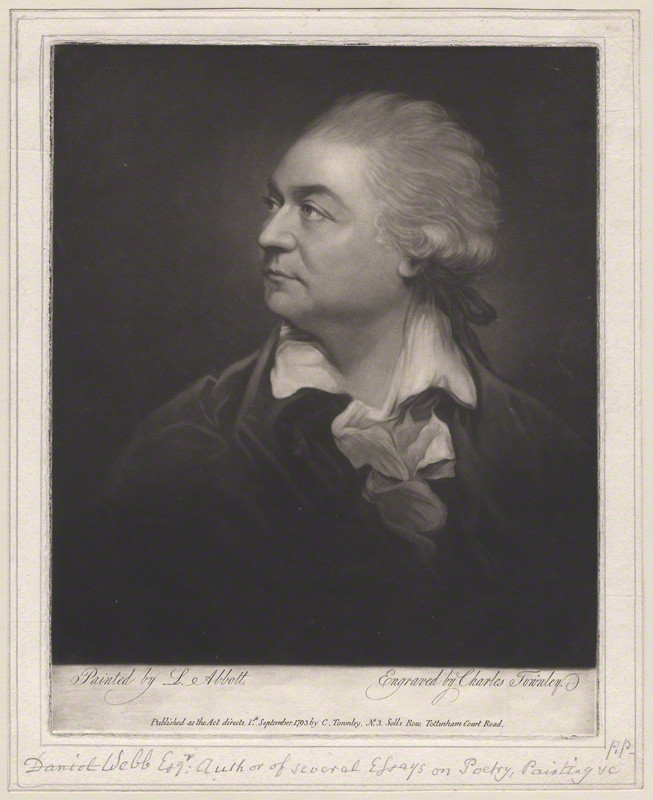
- Francis Webb by Charles Townley, after Lemuel Francis Abbott.
- Born: 18 September 1735; Taunton
- Died: 2 August 1815 (aged 79); Barrington, Somerset
- Occupation: Writer

Francis Webb (18 September 1735 – 2 August 1815) was an English writer.

== Biography ==
Webb was born at Taunton on 18 September 1735. He was the third son of John Webb of Taunton, by his wife Mary, daughter and coheiress of William Sweet of the same town. He was educated at Abingdon and Bristol; afterwards studied theology under Philip Doddridge and his successor, Caleb Ashworth, at the independent academy at Northampton and Daventry. He finished his training with Thomas Amory at Taunton. He entered the nonconformist ministry, became pastor of the congregation at Honiton, and on 27 September 1758 was inducted assistant to Joseph Burroughs, minister of the general baptist congregation at Paul's Alley, London. On the death of Burroughs, on 23 Nov. 1761, Webb undertook the sole charge. In 1766, he retired from the pastoral office and he filled the office of deputy searcher at Gravesend until 1777, when he removed to Poole in Dorset. In 1775 he republished Dr. Johnson's ‘Marmor Norfolciense,’ a squib against Walpole, which first appeared in 1739. Johnson had not concealed his Jacobite principles in penning it, and Webb, in a satirical preface, cleverly contrasted the views he had then held with those he manifested in the ‘False Alarm’ (1770) and in ‘Taxation no Tyranny’ (1775). During Webb's residence in Dorset, he acquired the favour of the Duke of Leeds, the secretary of state, who employed him on several occasions. In 1786, he was appointed secretary to Sir Isaac Heard, and accompanied him to Hesse-Cassel to invest the landgrave with the order of the Garter. In 1801, he accompanied Francis James Jackson to Paris, acting as his secretary during the negotiation of the treaty of Amiens. He was employed by Jackson during the negotiations as an unofficial intermediary, the French diplomatists having much faith in his integrity from their knowledge of his sympathy with Napoleon's government. The understanding of the British envoys with the royalist and ultra-republican malcontents and conspirators was, however, intolerable to him, and he retired to England before the conclusion of peace. He was an intimate friend of the artist Giles Hussey, and wrote a memoir of him which appeared in the ‘History of Dorset’ by John Hutchins, and in Nichols's ‘Literary Anecdotes’. He also gave a more detailed account of Hussey's methods in ‘Panharmonicon’, a description of one of his engravings. In 1811, while residing at Lufton, near Yeovil, where he settled Webb became a unitarian. He died at Barrington, near Ilminster in Somerset, on 2 August 1815, without surviving issue. On 31 March 1764 he was married at Wareham in Dorset to Hannah, daughter of William Milner of Poole.

Webb's portrait has been engraved from a picture by Lemuel Francis Abbott.

== Works ==
- "Sermons," London, 1766, 16mo; 3rd edit. with memoir, London, 1818, 8vo.
- "Thoughts on the Constitutional Right and Power of the Crown in the bestowal of Places and Pensions," London, 1772, 8vo.
- "An Epistle to the Rev. Mr. Kell, with an Ode to Fortitude," Salisbury, 1788, 4to.
- "Poems: on Wisdom; on the Deity; on Genius," Salisbury, 1790, 4to.
- "Ode to the rural Nymphs of Brasted," 1801, 4to.
- "Somerset: a Poem," London, 1811, 4to.
- Three letters of his are preserved among Warren Hastings's correspondence in the British Library Additional Manuscripts (Add MS 17176, f. 171; Add MS 19174, ff. 122 & 419).
