= Frane Bitunjac =

Croatian footballer

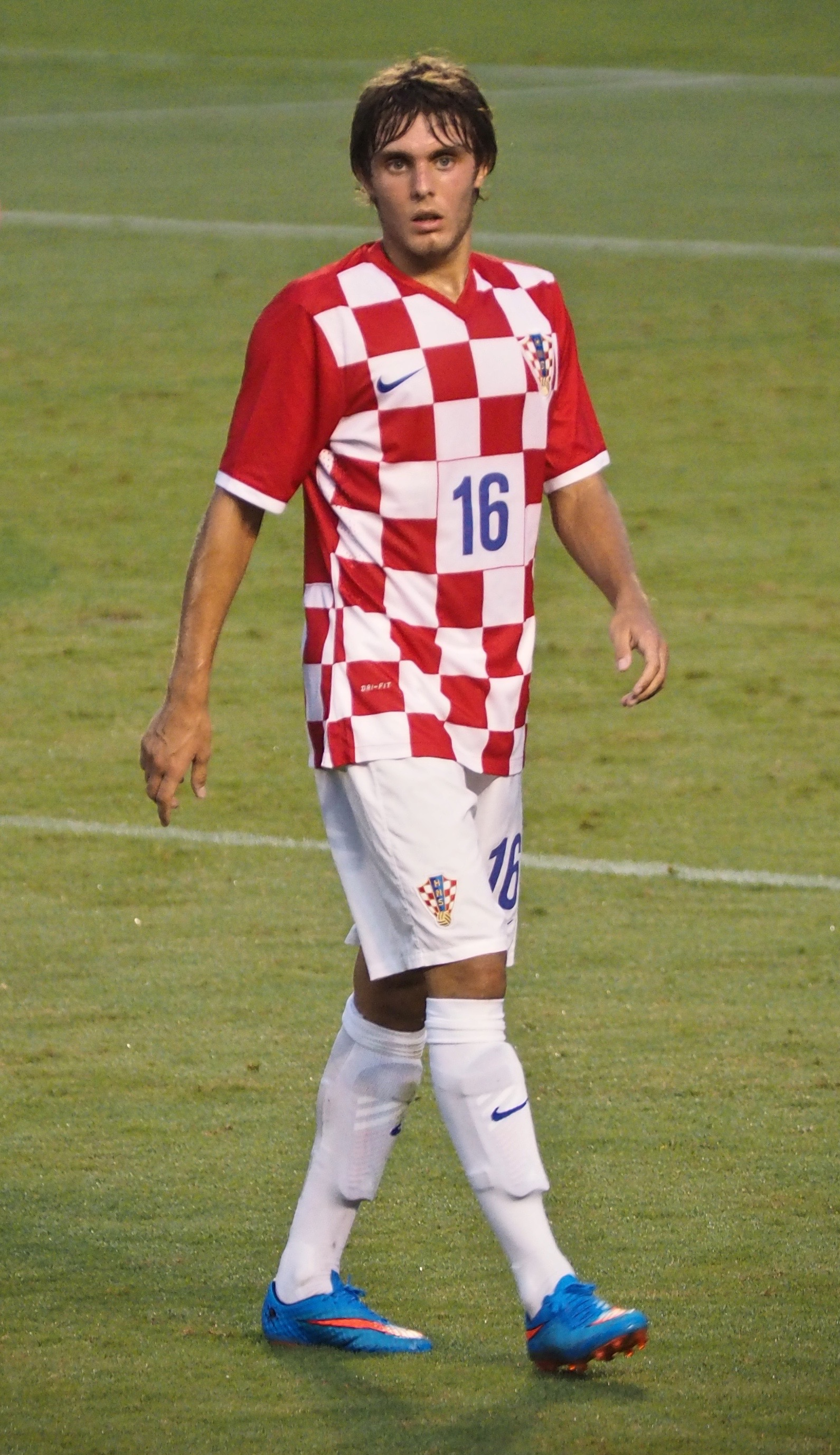

Personal information
- Full name: Frane Bitunjac
- Date of birth: 4 September 1997 (age 29)
- Place of birth: Split, Croatia
- Height: 1.78 m (5 ft 10 in)
- Position: Striker

Team information
- Current team: Primorac Biograd

Youth career
- 2004–2007: Dinara
- 2007–2014: Šibenik
- 2014–2016: Fiorentina

Senior career*
Years	Team	Apps	(Gls)
2016–2017	Šibenik	0	(0)
2017–2020	Zagora Unešić	77	(7)
2020–	Primorac Biograd		

International career
2011	Croatia U14	4	(0)
2012	Croatia U15	2	(0)
2012–2013	Croatia U16	4	(0)
2013	Croatia U17	5	(0)
2014	Croatia U18	2	(0)
2014–2015	Croatia U19	13	(0)
- * Club domestic league appearances and goals as of 8 March 2021

Frane Bitunjac (born 4 September 1997 in Split, Croatia) is a Croatian footballer who plays as a midfielder for Primorac Biograd.

== Club career ==
Frane was born in Split but grew up in Kričak and he lived in Knin near Šibenik, playing for youth team of Dinara Knin. He moved to Šibenik and was a constant member of Croatian youth teams. On 31 January 2014 it was announced that Frane will join Fiorentina in summer of 2014 for an undisclosed fee. After joining HNK Šibenik and not playing enough, Frane signed for NK Zagora Unesic football club playing in 3rd Croatian league. Frane showed his huge talent playing as a central midfielder and become one of the best players on the team.
