= Ferencsik =

Ferencsik is a Hungarian surname. Notable people with the surname include:

- Bálint Ferencsik (born 2005), Hungarian footballer
- János Ferencsik (1907–1984), Hungarian conductor
