= Franek =

Oldest oil shaft in the world

Franek is the oldest oil shaft in the world, located in the village of Bóbrka, Poland. It was dug in 1854 by hand by Ignacy Łukasiewicz.
