= Shingebis =

Native American myth

Shingebis (or Shingebiss) is a figure in indigenous North American mythology, appearing in various Native American stories that exemplify perseverance and strength in the face of adversity. While the narratives vary, they typically focus on an underdog who defies harsh winter conditions, representing virtues such as courage and resilience. Shingebis is often depicted as a duck, and the stories highlight the protagonist's ability to withstand the cold while others succumb.

In some renditions, Shingebis is portrayed as a young woman, while in others, the protagonist takes the form of a duck. Despite various interpretations, the central theme remains consistent: the triumph of the underdog against the odds.

== Story ==
=== Ojibwa ===
One of the most well-known versions of the Shingebis story comes from the Ojibwa (Chippewa) tradition. In this narrative, Shingebis was a resourceful, solitary loon that lived in a lodge alone by a frozen lake. She had four logs of wood to burn. Since each log would burn for four lunar phases, She had just enough wood to stay warm all winter. Shingebis was resilient, unaffected by the cold weather. When the wind was coldest, Shingebis would fish through holes in the ice.

Kabibona'kan (the cold North wind, often referred to as the Winter Maker) observes Shingebis's aloofness and ability to endure and attempts to defeat her. Kabibona'kan unleashed the north wind ten times colder, causing a heavy snow storm. Even with the harsh weather conditions, the fire in the lodge of Shingebis burned on, and she went on with her daily activities.

Watching Shingebis carry her hunt for the day, Kabibona'kan decided to visit Shingebis at her lodge. He went later that night unannounced, and Shingebis didn't know or care. She cooked and ate her fish she caught earlier, rested by the fire, and sung a mocking song about Kabibona'kan:

Ka neej, ka neej,
Bi in, bi in,
Bon in, bon in,
Ok ee, ok ee,
Ka weya, ka weya.

Shingebis was unaware of Kabibona'kan's presence, and continued to sing repeatedly, much to Kabibona'kan's annoyance. He entered Shingebis's lodge and sat down opposite from her. Shingebis was non-confrontational and unfrightened. She merely stirred the coals of the fire and sang "you are my fellow creature", regarding Kabibona'kan as another living thing rather than an enemy. Kabibona'kan's began to cry frozen tears and whispered to himself, "I cannot endure this; I must leave." He left the lodge silently and flew to Shingebis's fishing hole, freezing the reeds to prevent Shingebis from fishing.

Despite Kabibona'kan's efforts, Shingebis found fish all winter and laughed at Kabibona'kan's failure. Kabibona'kan finally surrenders. He says Manitou must be helping her, as it cannot freeze or starve Shingebis, admitting the loon's strength. With four lunar cycles, Shingebis's four logs burned, and she continued to laugh and sing by the water.

This story serves as a reminder of perseverance and fortitude within Ojibwa legend.

=== Other versions ===
A variant of the Shingebis story is found within the Indigenous cultures of the Great Lakes region. In this version, Shingebis is a diving duck who dares to defy Winter. Choosing not to migrate south, Shingebis builds a warm lodge and maintains a fire throughout the winter months. Despite challenges from Kabibonooka, the Winter Maker, Shingebis remains resilient by adapting to changing conditions. This story, too, emphasizes themes of courage and determination in the face of adversity.

== See also ==
- Henry Wadsworth Longfellow
- The Song of Hiawatha
- The North Wind and the Sun
