= Frano Kršinić (biologist) =

Croatian marine biologist

Frano Kršinić (born 23 August 1947) is a Croatian marine biologist.

Kršinić was born in Lumbarda, on the island of Korčula. He obtained his B.Sc., M.Sc. and Ph.D. degrees from the Faculty of Science, University of Zagreb.

Since 1972 he was employed at the Institute of Oceanography and Fisheries in Dubrovnik, where he was a head of the Laboratory of Plankton Ecology until his retirement in 2013. His research focus is plankton of the Adriatic Sea.

Kršinić is a full member of the Croatian Academy of Sciences and Arts since 2000. He is the chairman of the Academy's Scientific Council for Adriatic Research.

== Sources ==
- Frano Kršinić, F.C.A.
- Frano Kršinić at the Ruđer Bošković Institute (in Croatian)
