= Francis Cornelius Webb =

English physician and medical writer

Francis Cornelius Webb (1826–1873) was an English physician and medical writer.

== Life ==
Born in Hoxton Square east of London on 9 April 1826, he was the eldest son of William Webb, a cadet of the family of Webb of Odstock Manor, by his second wife, Elizabeth Priscilla, daughter of Thomas Massett. He was educated at King's College School, London, and at Devonport Grammar School.

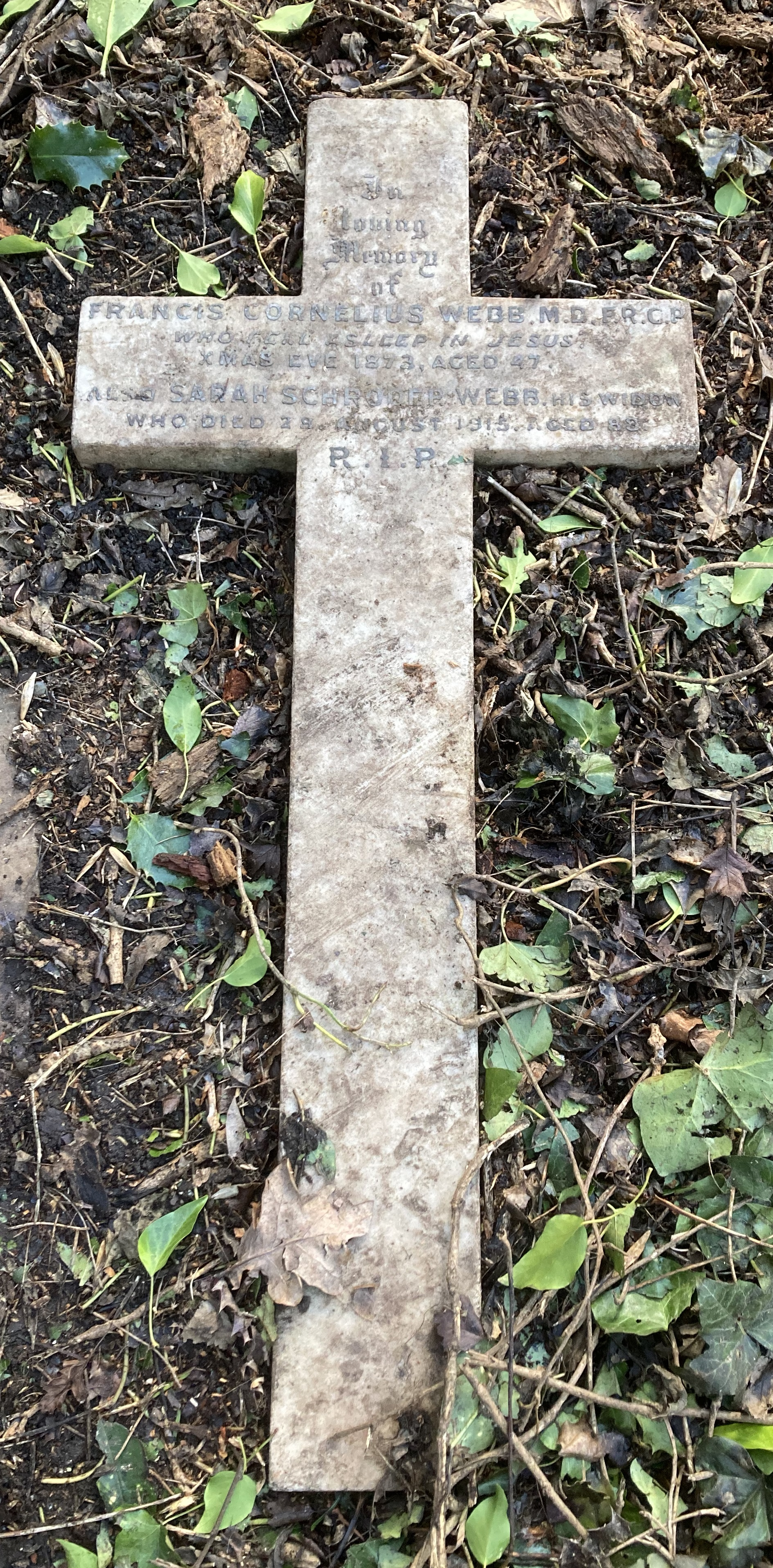
Grave of Francis Cornelius Webb in Highgate Cemetery

On 25 September 1841 Webb was apprenticed to James Sheppard, a surgeon at Stonehouse, and in 1843 he joined the medical school of University College, London. He was awarded five gold and silver medals for proficiency in different classes. In 1847 he became a member of the College of Surgeons of London; in 1849 he went to Edinburgh, graduating M.D. there in 1850 with the thesis "On the general anatomy, physiology and development of the arterial system". In 1851 he returned to London.

In 1859 Webb was appointed a member of the Royal College of Physicians, and he was elected a fellow on 31 July 1873. In 1857 he was nominated to the chair of medical jurisprudence in the Grosvenor Place school of medicine, and subsequently he was lecturer on natural history at the Metropolitan School of Dental Science. At the end of the 1860s he became one of the editors of the Medical Times and Gazette, and for the last years of his life he was editor-in-chief.

Webb was elected a fellow of the Society of Antiquaries of London on 22 May 1856, of the Linnean Society on 21 January 1858, and of other learned bodies. He died on 24 December 1873, and was buried on the west side of Highgate Cemetery.

== Works ==
In 1861 at the Grosvenor Place school Webb delivered the introductory lecture on The Study of Medicine: its Dignity and Rewards, which was published. His first significant work was an article on "The Sweating Sickness in England", published in the Sanitary Review and Journal of Public Health for July 1857, later republished separately. It was followed by "An Historical Account of Gaol Fever", read before the Epidemiological Society on 6 July 1857, and printed in the Transactions of the society. In 1858 he wrote an essay on "Metropolitan Hygiene of the Past" was written by Webb for the Sanitary Review; it was reprinted separately in the same year. It surveyed the sanitary condition of London from the time of the Norman conquest.

When the major work of John Hunter on the teeth was published in the Dental Review, Webb contributed updated notes to the text, Hunter's Natural History of the Human Teeth,’ with notes by Webb and Robert Thomas Hulme, appeared in 1865. Webb published also Biographies of Sir Benjamin Brodie, Bart., and of P. C. Price, Surgeon to King's College Hospital, London, 1865.

== Family ==
On 10 February 1852 Webb married Sarah Schröder, daughter of Joseph Croucher of Great James's Street, Buckingham Gate. They had 12 children, ten of whom survived him.

== Notes ==
Attribution

This article incorporates text from a publication now in the public domain: Lee, Sidney, ed. (1899). "Webb, Francis Cornelius". Dictionary of National Biography. Vol. 60. London: Smith, Elder & Co.
