= Francis Uche Agabige =

Nigerian politician

Member of the Imo State House of Assembly
- Constituency: Orsu Constituency

Personal details
- Born: Imo State, Nigeria
- Party: All Progressives Congress (APC)
- Occupation: Politician

Francis Uche Agabige is a Nigerian politician who currently serves as the representative for the Orsu constituency at the Imo State House of Assembly.
