= Darren DeFrain =

American author and teacher

- Born: June 15, 1967 (age 59); Fairbanks, Alaska, U.S.
- Education: University of Utah (BA, BS); Kansas State University (MA); Texas State University (MFA); Western Michigan University (PhD)
- Occupations: Author; educator
- Writing career
- Genre: Fiction

Darren DeFrain (born June 15, 1967) is an American author and teacher of creative writing who writes novels, short fiction, and essays.

== Life and education ==
Darren DeFrain was born June 15, 1967, in Fairbanks, Alaska. He received a B.A. in English, B.S. in Psychology, and a minor in Italian from the University of Utah in 1989, an M.A. from Kansas State University in 1992, MFA from Texas State University in 1995, and a Ph.D. in Creative Writing from Western Michigan University in 2000. He lives in Wichita.

== Career ==
Darren DeFrain is the author of two books of fiction. His novel The Salt Palace (2005) was nominated for several best-of-the-year lists including The Kansas City Star. This heavily footnoted, postmodern work, sometimes described as a cult novel, examines the histories of the LDS church, the state of Utah, and the Utah Jazz basketball franchise against the story of Brian Peterson and a one-armed hitchhiker as they attempt a dangerous series of road games on their way from Michigan to Utah. DeFrain’s collection of short fiction, Inside & Out: Stories, debuted in 2009 and was praised by MacArthur Fellow Stuart Dybek, and Rea award winner Antonya Nelson.

DeFrain has been on faculty at Wichita State University since 2005 and is currently associate professor.
