= Francis Bernard =

Francis Bernard may refer to:

- Francis Bernard (physician) (died 1698), English apothecary, physician and bibliophile
- Francis Bernard (judge) (1663–1731), Solicitor-General for Ireland and Irish MP for Clonakilty, Bandonbridge
- Sir Francis Bernard, 1st Baronet (1712–1779), British Governor in New Jersey and Massachusetts
- Francis Bernard, 1st Earl of Bandon (1755–1830), Irish peer and MP for Ennis, Bandonbridge
- Francis Bernard, 3rd Earl of Bandon (1810–1877), Irish MP for Bandon, Lord Lieutenant of Cork
- Francis Bernard (artist) (born 1928), French artist
- Francis Bernard (American football) (born 1995), American football linebacker
- Francis Bernard (engineer) (born 1940), founder and CEO of Dassault Systèmes
- Francis James Bernard (1796–1843), founder and first police chief of the Singapore Police Force

== See also ==
- Sir Francis Bernard-Morland, 5th Baronet (1790–1876) of the Bernard baronets
- Bernard (surname)
