= Francis Sultana =

Furniture and interior designer

- Born: Francis Sultana; February 1980 (age 46); Valletta, Malta
- Occupation: Interior designer
- Website: https://www.francissultana.com

Francis Sultana is a Maltese-born furniture and interior designer. Sultana is also CEO of David Gill Gallery in London. He is regularly featured in the annual AD100 list compiled by Architectural Digest. The Times says he is "a furniture designer and decorating mastermind" and also mentions his famous clients. Financial Times How To Spend It magazine said "his baroque-meets-pop art style is making grand statements in an ever-widening circle of homes." Living Etc magazine describes Sultana's style as "luxurious, bespoke-driven and sumptuous".

In 2018 Sultana was made Ambassador of Culture for Malta. He was named as one of the Top 20 interior designers by Wallpaper magazine and Top 100 Interior Designers by House & Garden magazine. The Financial Times said of his first hotel project La Palma Hotel, Capri for Oetker Collection that it is "a glamorous new start for Capri's oldest hotel". In 2021 Sultana became custodian of The Hunting Lodge, the former home of British interior designers John Fowler and Nicky Haslam.

== Background ==
Sultana grew up on the island of Gozo, and gave an Insiders Guide to Malta to the Financial Times How To Spend It magazine Malta: Interior Designer Francis Sultana's Favourite European Island. "As a child," explains W Magazine "a young Sultana would pour over copies of World of Interiors and House & Garden magazines" before he finally moved to London when he was 19. He began work at David Gill Gallery which he talks about in Elle Decor. He became the gallerist to Dame Zaha Hadid and created an exhibition celebrating her life and work at Masterpiece in 2016 which is described by London Evening Standard as "an exhibition to celebrate the other side of Zaha Hadid."

== Career ==
Francis Sultana is regularly featured in the prestigious AD100 list compiled by Architectural Digest magazine Architectural Digest . In 2021 AD France listed Francis as a 'Grandmaster of Interior Design' placing him alongside the six great designers in the world of luxury interior design. His annual collections of furniture are shown at prestigious venues such as Claridges in London Narmina Collection, Wallpaper. He was the only British-based designer to be invited to show at the AD Collections in Paris in 2017 held at the Musée d'Art Moderne de la Ville de Paris. 2019 was the tenth anniversary of the studio. His debut book was published by Vendome in Fall 2019 entitled "Francis Sultana Designs & Interiors". which the Sunday Times called "One of the best design books of 2019."

Sultana has collaborated with some of the world's best luxury brands including Bonacina, with whom he launched a major collection at Milan's Salone di Mobile 2023 " as well as Savoir Beds in the UK " Ginori1975 and Galerie Diurne in Paris.

Sultana currently sits on the board of MICAS the new contemporary art and design space for Malta due to open in 2024 and invited renowned artist and sculptor Ugo Rondinone to create a site specific piece which was launched in 2018 which was described by the Times of Malta as "a place for the people.". In 2019 artist Pierre Huyghe exhibited "Exomind (Deep Water)" in the Wiedl il-Luq in Buskett Gardens, Valletta. In 2022 US artist Michele Oka Doner exhibited The Palm Goddess of Malta and was featured in Airmail "

== Philanthropy ==
Francis Sultana sat on the Board for Rebuilding Childhoods for the NSPCC for eight years and oversaw the Pop Art Ball, the Surrealist Ball and the Neo-Romantic Gala at Masterpiece. He currently sits on the International Council of the Victoria & Albert Museum for whom he chaired the Design Fund which supported the acquisition of contemporary design objects at the V&A from 2011 to 2015. The Fund has enabled the museum to purchase a number of notable objects by designers such as Joris Laarman, Fredrikson Stallard, Hella Jongerius and nendo. Sultana also sits on the International Council of the Design Museum and is co-head of the Cultural and Social Affairs Committee for the Serpentine Galleries, London. He was co-president of the jury for Pavilion of Art and Design London and is a jury member of PAD Paris.
