= Fran (given name) =

Fran is a Spanish, Italian, Croatian and Albanian male name or a common short form of the English names Frances and Francis. The Spanish and Italian Fran is more common for men, while the English name is mostly used for women. While the Croatian, Slovene and Albanian Fran is used as a proper name only for men.

Fran is the name of:

== People ==
=== Women ===
- Fran Adams, American actress
- Frances Fran Allison (1907–1989), American television and radio comedian, personality and singer, star of the television show Kukla, Fran and Ollie
- Fran Baum, Australian social scientist
- Fran Blanche, American engineer and guitar pedal builder
- Frances Fran Brill (born 1946), American retired Muppets puppeteer and actress
- Fran Capo, American motivational speaker and author
- Francine "Fran" Drescher (born 1957), American actress, comedienne and producer
- Fran Gebhard, Canadian theatre director and actor
- Francis Fran Jeffries (1937–2016), American actress, singer and model
- Fran Jonas (born 2004), New Zealand cricketer
- Fran Kirby (born 1993), English association footballer
- Frances Fran Lebowitz (born 1950), American author and public speaker
- Fran Ross (1935–1985), American comedy writer and novelist
- Fran Ryan (1916–2000), American actress
- Fran Scott, British television presenter
- Fran Stallings (born 1943), American storyteller
- Fran Unsworth (born 1957), BBC News executive
- Fran Warren, stage name of American singer Frances Wolfe (1926–2013)
- Frances Fran Wilde (born 1948), New Zealand politician

=== Men ===
- Fran Albreht (1889–1963), Slovene writer and politician
- Fran Bošnjaković (1902–1993), Croatian thermodynamicist
- Fran Bradač (1885–1970), Slovene classical philologist
- Fran Brodić (born 1997), Croatian football player
- Fran Cosgrave (born 1977), Irish nightclub owner and minor celebrity
- Fran Covey, American politician
- Fran Čubranić (born 1997), Croatian water polo player
- Fran Detela (1850–1926), Slovene writer
- Francisco Fran Escribá (born 1965), Spanish football manager
- Fran Krsto Frankopan (1643–1671) Croatian baroque poet, nobleman and politician
- Fran Fraschilla (born 1958), American basketball commentator and former college basketball coach
- Fran Saleški Finžgar (1871–1962), Slovene folk writer
- Fran Galović (1887–1914), Croatian writer
- Fran Gerbič (1840–1917), Slovene composer
- Francisco Javier González Pérez (born 1969), Spanish footballer better known as Fran
- Francis Fran Healy (baseball) (born 1946), American Major League Baseball broadcaster and former player
- Francis Fran Healy (musician) (born 1973), Scottish lead singer and main songwriter of the rock band Travis
- Fran Jesenko (1875–1932), Slovenian botanist
- Fran Karačić (born 1996), Croatian football player
- Fran Kurniawan (born 1985), Indonesian badminton player
- Fran Levstik (1831–1887), Slovene writer, political activist, playwright and critic
- Fran Lhotka (1883–1962), Czech-born Croatian composer
- Fran Mileta (born 2000), Croatian handball player
- Fran Millar (born 1949), American politician
- Fran Milčinski (1867–1932), pen name Fridolin Žolna, Slovene lawyer, writer and playwright
- Fran Novljan (1879–1977), Croatian educator
- Francis Fran O'Brien (American football) (1936–1999), American National Football League player
- Fran O'Brien (footballer) (born 1955), Irish footballer in Ireland and the North American Soccer League
- Francisco Fran Perea (born 1978), Spanish singer and actor
- Fran Pilepić (born 1989), Croatian basketball player
- Fran Ramovš (1890–1952), Slovene linguist
- Fran Roš (1898–1976), Slovene writer, poet and playwright
- Fran Smith Jr. (fl. 1978–present), American bass guitarist with the rock band The Hooters
- Francis Fran Tarkenton (born 1940), American retired National Football League Hall-of-Fame quarterback
- Fran Tudor (born 1995), Croatian football player
- Francisco Fran Vázquez (born 1983), Spanish basketball player
- Francisco Fran Vélez (born 1991), Spanish footballer
- Francisco Javier Fran Yeste (born 1979), Spanish footballer

== Fictional characters ==
- Fran, from the video game Final Fantasy XII
- Fran Fine, the protagonist of the TV series The Nanny
- Fran Bow Dagenhart, the protagonist of the video game Fran Bow

== See also ==
- Frane
