= Zalaboldogfa =

- Village
- Flag Coat of arms

- Location of Zalaboldogfa
- Coordinates: 46.89951°N 16.76971°E
- Country: Hungary
- Region: Western Transdanubia
- County: Zala
- District: Zalaegerszeg

Area
  - Total: 11.34 km^{2} (4.38 sq mi)

Population (1 January 2026)
  - Total: 375
  - Density: 33.1/km^{2} (85.6/sq mi)
- Time zone: UTC+1 (CET)
  - Summer (DST): UTC+2 (CEST)
- Postal code: 8992
- Area code: (+36) 92
- Website: zalaboldogfa.hu

Zalaboldogfa is a village northwest of Zalaegerszeg in Zala County, Hungary.
