= Re: Fraynes =

- Also known as: The Fraynes
- Genre: Sports talk show
- Presented by: Trent Frayne; June Callwood
- Country of origin: Canada
- Original language: English
- No. of seasons: 1

Production
- Running time: 15 minutes (approx.)

Original release
- Network: CBC Television
- Release: 16 October 1954 – 30 April 1955

Re: Fraynes (later The Fraynes) is a Canadian sports talk show which aired on CBC Television from 1954 to 1955.

== Premise ==
Sports personalities were interviewed in a set which resembled a recreation room. Hosts were journalists Trent Frayne and his wife June Callwood. The program was retitled The Fraynes from the 26 February 1955 episode.

Guests included Edmonton Eskimos player Norman Kwong (27 November 1954).

== Scheduling ==
This program, approximately 15 minutes, was broadcast Saturday nights following the hockey broadcast from 16 October 1954 to 30 April 1955. It filled network time until the newscast at 11:00 p.m..
