= Frano Radman =

Frano Radman (Donji Muć, 1722 – Makarska, 1789) was a Venetian Dalmatian Franciscan friar and writer. He was a friend of Andrija Kačić Miošić. He was the first to use the pseudonym Gajetan Deribak, the other being friar Gašpar Vinjalić (d. 1781) from Zadar. He was possibly a relative of Josip Radman.
