= Trent Frayne =

Canadian sportswriter (1918–2012)

- Born: September 13, 1918; Brandon, Manitoba
- Died: February 11, 2012 (aged 93); Toronto, Ontario
- Occupations: journalist, sportswriter
- Awards: Elmer Ferguson Memorial Award (1984)

Trent Gardiner Frayne (September 13, 1918 – February 11, 2012) was a Canadian sportswriter whose career stretched over 60 years. Pierre Berton described Frayne as "likely Canada's greatest sportswriter ever."

== Early life ==
"Billy" Frayne, as he was known as a youth, was the only child born to father Homer, who was a railroader for the Canadian Pacific Railway and mother Ella Trent in Brandon, Manitoba.

== Career ==
He began his journalism career with the Brandon Sun at the age of 15 covering minor hockey and moved to Winnipeg, Manitoba three years later to accept a job with the Canadian Press and the Winnipeg Tribune in 1938. He shared lodgings with Winnipeg Free Press columnist Scott Young and befriended Tribune columnist Ralph Allen. He covered his first World Series in 1941 and interviewed Joe DiMaggio. He left Winnipeg in 1942 for Ontario leaving his childhood nickname behind in favour of his given name of Trent.

He followed Young and Allen to Toronto and joined The Globe and Mail as a general reporter earning $45 a week. At the Globe he met June Callwood whom he married in 1944. Frayne resumed his work as a full-time sportswriter when he joined the staff of the Toronto Telegram. He moved to Maclean's Magazine in the 1950 where Callwood was by then working as a freelancer. Fellow Maclean's writer Pierre Berton became a close friend and said of the couple "They were very much in love, a handsome couple who called each other 'Dreamy,'" The couple raised four children in the Etobicoke home they shared until Callwood's death in 2007. Frayne and Callwood also hosted the CBC Television talk show The Fraynes in the 1954–1955 television season.

In 1959, Frayne was hired by the Toronto Star as a feature writer and, from 1962 to 1968, worked as a publicist for the Ontario Jockey Club before resuming his journalism career and then moving to the Toronto Sun in the 1970s. From 1983 to 1989, the couple both worked as columnists at The Globe and Mail. Frayne wrote monthly columns for Maclean's from 1989 until his retirement at the age of 78 in 1997.

During his career, Frayne's work also appeared in Chatelaine, Sports Illustrated and Saturday Evening Post magazines. He wrote more than a dozen books, won the National Newspaper Award for sports writing in 1975 and was the first recipient of Brandon University's Quill Award for Outstanding Achievement in 1990. He was honored by the Hockey Hall of Fame in 1984, receiving the Elmer Ferguson Memorial Award, and was inducted into the Canadian Football Hall of Fame in 1988. Frayne was also inducted into the Canadian News Hall of Fame and honoured with a life membership in the Baseball Writers of America.

== Personal life and death ==
Frayne's memoir is titled The Tales of an Athletic Supporter.

He and Callwood had four children, Jill (born 1945), Brant (born 1948), Jesse (born 1951) and Casey who was born in 1961 and was killed in a motorcycle accident in 1982.

He died at the age of 93 of pneumonia and complications related to old age.
