= Francis Katamba =

British linguist (born 1947)

- Born: 1 May 1947 (age 79); Kampala, Uganda
- Known for: English phonology; English morphology; Morphological theory; Phonological theory; African linguistics

Academic background
- Education: University of Edinburgh

Academic work
- Discipline: Linguist
- Sub-discipline: English phonology; English morphology; Morphological theory; Phonological theory; African linguistics
- Institutions: Lancaster University
- Website: Katamba on the website of Lancaster University

Francis X. Katamba (born 1947) is a Ugandan-born British linguist. He is currently an emeritus professor at the Department of Linguistics and English Language of Lancaster University, United Kingdom. His research focuses on Luganda phonology and morphology, English phonology and morphology, morphological theory, phonological theory, and African linguistics.

== Career ==
Katamba received his PhD from the University of Edinburgh in 1974 with a dissertation entitled, "Aspects of the Grammar of Luganda." He has been a professor at Lancaster University since 2000.

== Research ==
Katamba's research focuses on Luganda and English phonology and morphology.

He is credited for his work on inflectional phrase and Luganda tones. He had a long and fruitful collaboration with Larry Hyman investigating Luganda phonology .

Katamba claimed that exocentric compounds are headless – in other words they do not contain an element that can function as a semantic head in Morphology in 1993.

In his book, entitled Morphology and published in 2005, Katamba extended his analysis to other areas in linguistics to have a grasp of the morphology of words, but also a better understanding of the relationship between morphology, phonology and semantics, in addition to an overview of sociolinguistics and psycholinguistics.

In a chapter on back-formation, published in the Encyclopedia of Language & Linguistics (Second Edition) in 2006, he investigated the most productive type of back-formations, hypocoristics.

== Publications ==
Katamba has publications in several major journals such as English Language and Linguistics and Language.

Katamba has written numerous books entitled Introduction to Phonology (Longman, 1989), English Words (2nd edition, London: Routledge, 2005); Morphology (co-author John Stonham, London: Palgrave. 2nd ed. 2006) and he has edited several others, including Frontiers of Phonology, co-edited with Jacques Durand (Longman, 1995); Bantu Phonology and Morphology (Lincom Europa, Munich, 1995); Contemporary Linguistics: An Introduction 3rd ed. (edited with William O'Grady and Michael Dobrovolsky, London: Addison Wesley Longman, 1997) and Morphology: Critical Concepts. (London: Routledge. 6 volumes, 2004).

== Bibliography ==
=== Books ===
- Katamba, F. X. (2004). Morphology: Critical Concepts. Routledge.
- Katamba, F. X., & Stonham, J. (2006). Morphology. (Modern linguistics series). Basingstoke: Palgrave.
- Culpeper, J. V., Kerswill, P., Wodak, R., McEnery, T., & Katamba, F. (2018). English Language: Description, Variation and Context. (2nd ed.) London: Palgrave Macmillan.

=== Articles ===
- Katamba, F. (1975). "Death and Man in the Earlier Works of Wole Soyinka". The Journal of Commonwealth Literature, 9(3), 63–71. doi:
- Hyman, L. M. and Katamba, F. X. (1993). "A new approach to tone in Luganda". Language, 69. doi: 10.2307/416415
- Hyman, L. M. and Katamba, F. X. (2005). "The word in Luganda". In Erhard Voeltz (ed.), Studies in African Linguistic Typology. Amsterdam: John Benjamins, pp. 171–194.
- Katamba, F. X., Nurse, D. (Ed.), & Phillippson, G. (Ed.) (2002). "Review of H. J. Giegerich (1999) Lexical strata in English: morphological causes, phonological effects". English Language and Linguistics, 6(2), 379–416. doi:10.1017/S1360674302230282
