= Frane Poparić =

Croatian footballer (born 1959)

Personal information
- Full name: Frane Poparić
- Date of birth: 4 January 1959 (age 67)
- Place of birth: Sinj, SFR Yugoslavia
- Position: Defender

Youth career
- Junak Sinj

Senior career*
Years	Team	Apps	(Gls)
1976–1977	Hajduk Split	1	(0)
1981–1982	Solin	18	(4)
1984–1988	VÖEST Linz	91	(4)
1988–1989	Leibnitz		
1989–1990	VSE St. Pölten	25	(2)
1992–1993	Šibenik	9	(2)
- * Club domestic league appearances and goals

Frane Poparić (born 4 January 1959 in Sinj, SFR Yugoslavia) is a Croatian retired football defender who played for several Croatian and foreign football clubs.

== Career ==
Poparić began playing football with home town side NK Junak Sinj at age 14. He played professionally with Hajduk Split, NK Solin, VSE St. Pölten and HNK Šibenik.
