= 2017 in British television =

This is a list of events that took place in 2017 relating to Television in the United Kingdom.

== Events ==
=== January ===
Date	Event
1	BBC One launches a new set of idents, replacing the circle idents that have been shown before programmes for a decade. The new idents feature the photography of Martin Parr, who has attempted to capture portraits of modern Britain.
1	EastEnders airs the deaths of characters Ronnie and Roxy Mitchell in a swimming pool freak accident.
1	Sherlock returns to BBC One for a fourth series. Overnight viewing figures indicate the first episode was watched by an average audience of 8.1 million, making it the second most watched programme of the 2016–17 festive period; The New Year's Eve fireworks had a viewership of 11.6 million.
1	ITV Racing returns to ITV for the first time since 1985.
3	The lunchtime edition of Midlands Today is taken off air after staff are evacuated from The Mailbox complex when a fire alarm is activated. The incident turns out to be a false alarm.
4	Fawlty Towers is voted the best British sitcom of all time British sitcom in a survey of comedians, comedy writers and actors.
5	Channel 4 announce they are to show the Monaco Grand Prix and Singapore Grand Prix live for the first time in five years and the United States Grand Prix live for the first time in a decade on free-to-air TV, as they announce their picks for 2017. As part of the C4F1 coverage, also the British Grand Prix and Abu Dhabi Grand Prix as contracted.
6	The manufacturers of the Ant & Dec's Saturday Night Takeaway board game apologise after several of the quiz questions were found to have incorrect answers.
7	The BBC airs the first Saturday evening National Lottery Draw to be shown via BBC iPlayer only, the Corporation having taken the decision to stop broadcasting the draw live on BBC One after agreeing a new deal with Lottery operator Camelot Group.
7	BBC Two airs the documentary David Bowie: The Last Five Years on the eve of what would have been the singer's 70th birthday.
7	Let It Shine makes its debut on BBC One, while The Voice debuts on ITV. Overnight viewing figures indicate that an average audience of 6.3 million tuned in for Let It Shine, narrowly beating the 5.9 million who watched The Voice.
10	Former deputy governor of the Bank of England David Clementi is named as BBC chairman, heading the board of directors that will replace the BBC Trust.
11	BBC Director-General Tony Hall unveils plans to revamp BBC iPlayer in order to make it the premier online television service by 2020.
12	BBC One announces the launch of The Big Painting Challenge, a boot-camp style series that will see amateur artists compete for the title of Britain's best amateur artist. The prime-time Sunday evening show, which will begin in February, will be presented by will be hosted by Mariella Frostrup and the Rev Richard Coles.
12	BBC Two has commissioned Terry Pratchett: Back in Black, a documentary about the fantasy author Terry Pratchett which takes a humorous look at his life story.
13	Sky says it has pulled an episode of its series Urban Myths about Michael Jackson following a complaint from his daughter. Paris Jackson had said that she was "incredibly offended" by the portrayal of her father in the programme due to be aired by Sky Arts.
13	Richard Ayoade will present a new series of The Crystal Maze when it returns to Channel 4 later this year, the broadcaster announces. Stephen Merchant presented a one off edition of the game show last year.
13	Channel 5 weather presenter Sian Welby will join Heart Radio to present the weekday evening show from 16 January.
14	The Russian version of "The Final Problem", the last in the current series of Sherlock, is illegally uploaded to the internet prior to its transmission on 15 January. The BBC launches an investigation into the leak. Overnight viewing figures suggest the show episode was watched by an audience of 5.9 million.
15	The BBC announce plans to adapt the John le Carré novel The Spy Who Came in from the Cold for television.
18	The BBC Trust rules that a BBC News at Six report from November 2015 discussing Labour leader Jeremy Corbyn's view on the shoot-to-kill policy in Northern Ireland was impartial and inaccurate.
18	Channel 4 announces that Wife Swap will return for a one-off Brexit special.
19	It is reported that Bill Emmott, a former board member of Ofcom, is seeking a judicial review into a decision by Secretary of State for Culture, Media and Sport Karen Bradley to dismiss him from his post without compensation after he expressed support for the European Union.
19	ITV announces that it has axed The Xtra Factor from ITV2. Future editions of the programme will appear online only.
20	BBC One and ITV provide live coverage of the inauguration of Donald Trump as the 45th President of the United States; BBC coverage of the event is presented by BBC World's Katty Kay, with ITV's coverage presented by Tom Bradby. Also, BBC News announces that Kay would co-present 100 Days covering Trump's first 100 days, however in the end the programme carries on indfefinley apart from a summer break in August.
20	Angus Deayton is confirmed as the new host of Creme de la Creme, a Great British Bake Off spin-off series that will continue to air on the BBC.
24	BBC Two announce plans for Geri's Nineties: The Decade That Made Me, a series in which former Spice Girl Geri Horner will look back at the 1990s.
25	At the 22nd National Television Awards, Ant & Dec are presented with the Television Presenter Award for the sixteenth consecutive year.
27	BBC Two airs Eurovision: You Decide from London's Hammersmith Apollo, where former X Factor contestant Lucie Jones is chosen to represent the United Kingdom in the 2017 Eurovision Song Contest with the song "Never Give Up on You".
30	Peter Capaldi announces his intention to leave Doctor Who at the end of the year.
31	Dermot O'Leary and Emma Willis are chosen to host the 2017 Brit Awards after Michael Bublé pulled out because his son is receiving treatment for cancer.
31	BBC Two airs the 1971 film 10 Rillington Place following the death of Sir John Hurt, who plays the role of Timothy Evans.

=== February ===
Date	Event
1	It is announced that Nick Jenkins and Sarah Willingham will leave Dragons' Den when the current series ends on 26 February.
2	Kris Marshall announces he is leaving the role of DI Humphrey Goodman in BBC One's Death in Paradise at the end of the current series. His place will be taken by Ardal O'Hanlon who will appear as a new detective.
2	Construction workers accidentally dig up and damage Blue Peter's Millennium Time Capsule while carrying out work at London's O2 Arena. The O2 has said it will work with the Blue Peter team to repair or replace the capsule, buried before the Millennium and due to be opened in 2050.
3	US human rights campaigner Kenneth Roth apologises to Newsnight presenter Emily Maitlis after mistakenly accusing her of running an alleged CIA torture site. Roth had tweeted a picture of Maitlis instead of Gina Haspel, named as CIA deputy director by US president Donald Trump.
3	With The Jump set to return to Channel 4 for a fourth series from 5 February, it is reported that the 2017 series has claimed its first casualty, with model Vogue Williams having to pull out because of a knee injury.
3	EastEnders fans express their disappointment on social media upon learning the evening's episode has been cancelled in favour of the BBC One documentary Spy in the Wild.
3	Coleen Nolan wins the nineteenth series of Celebrity Big Brother.
4	Sir Bradley Wiggins reveals that he has suffered a foot injury while training for the fourth series of The Jump, becoming the second participant to be injured during training for this year's series. However, Wiggins says he will continue as a contestant.
7	Debut of The Moorside, a BBC One drama starring Sheridan Smith and telling the story of the Shannon Matthews case. The first episode is received positively by critics.
7	Channel 5 announces that it will air a revamped and updated version of Blind Date.
8	Rolf Harris is cleared of three sex offence charges at Southwark Crown Court.
9	BBC Wales pulls a promotional trailer for the Six Nations rugby match between Wales and England to be held on 11 February after criticism that it was anti-English.
10	BBC Four acquires its first Canadian drama, the six part Cardinal, a detective series based on Giles Blunt's 2002 novel Forty Words for Sorrow. The series will air later in the year.
13	Sir Bradley Wiggins is forced to quit The Jump after sustaining what is described as a small leg fracture during snowcross training.
15	It has been announced that Rolf Harris will face a retrial on 15 May over three alleged sex offence charges and one new charge of indecent assault.
16	Edition of EastEnders in which Bex Fowler (played by Jasmine Armfield) performs the ballad "Boxed Up Broken Heart". The track, written by musician and singer Gwyneth Herbert, is part of a storyline in which the character pens the song after splitting from an onscreen boyfriend.
17	The BBC confirms that Danny Dyer will take a short break from his EastEnders role following a report in The Sun that bosses were concerned about his health.
19	The TV adaptation of Len Deighton's novel SS-GB, a series imagining an alternate history in which the United Kingdom is occupied by Nazi Germany, during the Second World War, debuts on BBC One. The first episode attracts a number of complaints from viewers unable to hear the dialogue, which is blamed on actors mumbling. The BBC says it will look at the sound quality before the next episode is transmitted.
19	Piers Morgan announces he will not present the Royal Television Society (RTS) Programme awards following a campaign to remove him. A petition asserting it was "not acceptable" for Morgan to present the awards ceremony attracted some 200 signatures after the RTS confirmed him as host on 16 February.
25	Ant & Dec's Saturday Night Takeaway returns for its fourteenth series.
27	Sky News relaunches its 10 pm bulletin with a new-look set and a focus on content from the Sky News team of specialists and broadcast from the new glass box studio at the heart of Sky's campus in Osterley, west London.
27	The Nightly Show is broadcast on ITV at 10 pm and runs for eight weeks and ITV News at Ten is moved to a temporary timeslot of 10.30 pm.

=== March ===
Date	Event
1	The television licence will increase from £145.50 to £147 on 1 April, it is announced – the first time the annual licence has increased since 2010.
2	Channel 5 announce plans to broadcast the Home and Away spin-off film Revenge, which gets its British television debut on 5Star on 13 March.
3	Isabelle Heward is named the 2017 Mastermind champion.
4	The BBC launches an investigation after a group of five intruders gained access to a studio at Broadcasting House during a live broadcast of the BBC News channel the previous evening. The individuals were not seen on air and left of their own accord.
16	Ofcom confirms it has received one complaint about a child grooming storyline in Coronation Street involving the character Bethany Platt (Lucy Fallon), although the plot has generally won praise from children's charities.
16	Channel 4 confirms Sandi Toksvig, Prue Leith and Noel Fielding will join Paul Hollywood when The Great British Bake Off returns later this year.
20	The final edition of Crimewatch is broadcast on BBC One. The programme ends as a monthly evening programme after nearly 33 years on air although it isn't until October that its cancellation is confirmed when it is announced that its daytime spin-off series Crimewatch Roadshow (now Crimewatch Live) would continue to air, but will also air more episodes per year.
22	The BBC and ITV interrupt their schedules to provide news coverage following a terrorist attack in Westminster.
23	Opening the first edition of BBC One's current affairs programme This Week to air in the wake of the Westminster attack, presenter Andrew Neil launches a scathing attack against those who commit acts of terrorism, describing them as "jumped up jihadis", and saying that Britain will never be "cowed" or "defeated" by them.
23	Channel 5 airs the documentary The Last Days of George Michael, prompting Michael's former bandmate, Andrew Ridgeley to criticise the programme as "sensationalist and mucky". Channel 5 defends its decision to broadcast the film, citing a "legitimate public interest in the circumstances surrounding his death".
24	The BBC released The Curse of Fatal Death, a 29-minute parody episode made for Red Nose Day in 1999. Written by the future Doctor Who writer Steven Moffat, the episode features Rowan Atkinson as The Doctor, with several other actors portraying different versions of the Time Lord, including Joanna Lumley as the first female Doctor. The episode has been released to coincide with Red Nose Day 2017.
27	BBC One airs Question Time: Britain After Brexit, a special edition of Question Time from Birmingham ahead of government preparations to trigger Article 50, the process of withdrawal from the European Union.
30	Comedian Sue Perkins will stand in for Graham Norton as presenter of the 2017 British Academy Television Awards because Norton will be in Kyiv in his role as presenter of the BBC's coverage of the 2017 Eurovision Song Contest.
30	Channel 5 celebrates its 20th anniversary.
31	The tenth series of Doctor Who, which begins on 15 April, will feature the first openly gay companion, Bill Potts (played by Pearl Mackie).
31	The BBC Three documentary film Reggie Yates's Hidden Australia is criticised by the BBC Trust for "[seriously breaching] its editorial guidelines" after some of its footage was found to be misleading. The film, made by Sunday Pictures, portrayed extreme drinking among the Aboriginal community at a party, which was in fact footage of several events held on different days, including scenes from a wake.

=== April ===
Date	Event
2	Mo Adeniran wins the sixth series of The Voice UK. The series final is briefly interrupted when the stage is invaded by an individual carrying a piece of paper which he attempts to show to the cameras.
2	BBC announces it has renewed its contract for exclusive contract to broadcast the Glastonbury Festival until 2022.
3	Beginning of a week of special editions of BBC World News's flagship interview programme HARDtalk celebrating its 20th anniversary. Programmes include an interview with Sir Ian McKellen recorded in front of a live audience at the BBC Radio Theatre, which airs on 4 April.
7	John Middleton makes his final appearance as Emmerdale character Ashley Thomas after 21 years with the show. The character dies after being diagnosed with incurable pneumonia.
8	Ant & Dec's Saturday Night Takeaway broadcasts live to the UK from Walt Disney World Resort in Orlando, Florida.
10	BBC period drama Call the Midwife will get its first black character, West Indian nurse Lucille, when it returns for a seventh series in 2018. BBC News reports casting is currently under way for the role.
10	Maxine Mawhinney presents her final bulletin on BBC News alongside Simon McCoy after 21 years with BBC News.
10	Balliol College, Oxford wins the 2016–17 series of University Challenge, beating Wolfson College, Cambridge 190–140.
11	Peter Kay's Car Share returns to BBC One for a second series. The opening episode sparks renewed interest in the 2001 compilation album Now That's What I Call Music! 48 after tracks from it are featured in the show. As a result of the series, Now 48 enters the album charts for the first time in several years.
15	Doctor Who returns to BBC One for its tenth series.
17	The finale of the final series of Broadchurch airs on ITV. Overnight audience figures indicate the episode was seen by an average of 8.7 million viewers (peaking at 9.3 million), the series' highest-ever viewership.
18	The BBC announces a season of programming on both radio and television to mark the 50th anniversary of 1967 Sexual Offences Act. The season, Gay Britannia, will examine the history of gay Britain and celebrate the LGBTQ community.
18	Told that Prime Minister Theresa May has called a snap general election for 8 June, a BBC vox pop interviewee, Brenda from Bristol, responds "You're joking – not another one!"
19	Crystal Palace chairman Steve Parish and former banker Jenny Campbell will join the next series of Dragons' Den, replacing Nick Jenkins and Sarah Willingham.
20	The BBC confirms David Dimbleby will present its coverage of the 2017 general election on 8 June. Dimbleby, who will be fronting his tenth general election coverage, had said before the 2015 general election that 2015 would be the last time he would present election coverage. Also it is announced that Huw Edwards will present the daytime coverage on 9 June.
22	An edition of ITV's Take Me Out is dedicated to a contestant who has died since the programme was filmed. An inquest in September hears the man hanged himself after losing his job because he took four days off work to appear on the show.
25	Katty Kay and Christian Fraser announce on air that the programme 100 Days will be extended. It will be renamed 100 Days + starting on Monday 1 May. This is partly due to the snap 2017 general election on 8 June. It also means World News Today, which fills the slot on Friday and weekends, would be saved for now, despite being axed a month earlier.
27	Crystal Palace chairman Steve Parish quits the Dragons' Den line-up before filming begins for the next series; he is replaced by Vitabiotics chairman Tej Lalvani.
27	Online food delivery service Just Eat signs a £10 million-a-year deal to sponsor The X Factor, one of the largest sponsorships for a weekly British television show.
28	Joseph Valente, winner of the 2015 series of The Apprentice is ending his business relationship with Lord Sugar, it is announced. Although Valente will take full control of his ImpraGas business, the two have parted amicably.
30	The Loose Women presenters launch their Body Stories campaign, featuring a billboard image of them all posing in swimwear with the slogan "Look but don't retouch". The campaign is aimed at addressing issues relating to body image.

=== May ===
Date	Event
3	It has been announced that Adam Crozier is to step down as ITV chief executive after seven years.
5	BBC Four airs the documentary Classic Albums: Carly Simon – No Secrets in which Carly Simon sings the words of a fourth verse she penned for her 1972 hit "You're So Vain" for the first time. However, the documentary does not shed any light on the song's subject.
9	Shirley Ballas will join the panel of judges on Strictly Come Dancing when it returns to BBC One later in the year, it is confirmed. She replaces Len Goodman, who stepped down at the end of the last series.
12	Junior doctor Saliha Mahmood-Ahmed wins the 2017 series of MasterChef.
12	EastEnders unveils plans to introduce a new family–the Taylors, who will arrive in Albert Square in summer 2017. Executive Producer Sean O'Connor describes the family as "noisy and brash", "[lacking] cash" but "[having] love and warmth in spades".
13	Portugal's Salvador Sobral wins the 2017 Eurovision Song Contest with the love ballad "Amar pelos dois". It is the first time Portugal have won the competition. The UK's entry, Lucie Jones comes fifteenth with her song "Never Give Up on You".
15	ITV airs the concluding episode of its four part drama, Little Boy Blue, a series dealing with the 2007 murder of Rhys Jones. The programme attracts criticism from the former Assistant Chief Constable of Merseyside, Patricia Gallan, who says some of its content "should not be taken as fact". Gallan herself is portrayed in the series by Sara Powell.
16	Debut of Three Girls, a hard hitting three-part BBC One drama about the Rochdale child grooming scandal. The series is later cited as an influence on Darren Osborne's decision to commit the Finsbury Park attack in June. Osborne's trial in early 2018 is told that he watched the drama a few weeks before carrying out the attack, and became fixated by its subject matter.
16	McDonald's says it will withdraw an advertising campaign featuring a boy who struggles to identify with his dead father until he visits the fast food restaurant. The commercial first aired on 12 May, and received hundreds of complaints from parents who said their children had been upset by its content, as well as drawing criticism from a bereavement charity for exploiting childhood grief. The ad was scheduled to run for seven weeks, but its last airdate will be on 17 May.
16	David Tennant and Billie Piper will reunite to play the Tenth Doctor and Rose Tyler for a series of audio dramas, it is announced.
18	Olivia Wardell wins Cycle 11 of Britain's Next Top Model.
19	Iran International television begins broadcasting to Iran from studios in London via satellite.
22	Ofcom decides not to launch an investigation into a rape scene that appeared in an episode of Emmerdale aired on 24 April, despite the content generating 101 viewer complaints.
22	Comedian Vic Reeves will make a cameo appearance in Coronation Street as a television producer, it is announced.
25	Channel 4 cut scenes of a bomb threat from their upcoming drama series Ackley Bridge, in the wake of the Manchester bombing attack.
25	The week's edition of BBC One's Question Time, scheduled to take place in Belfast, is instead moved to Salford in the wake of the Manchester Arena bombing. Panellists for the programme are Home Secretary Amber Rudd, Mayor of Greater Manchester Andy Burnham, anti-extremism campaigner Sara Khan, head of the Police and Crime Commissioners Association Nazir Afzal, and peace campaigner Colin Parry.
25	The BBC announces the BBC Store, a facility allowing viewers to buy and download BBC content, will close in November, two years after its launch.
25	Fred Talbot is found guilty at Lanark Sheriff Court of a string of sex offences against schoolboys during boating and camping trips in the 1970s and 1980s. He is sentenced on 15 June.
31	ITV announces plans to reschedule the eleventh series final of Britain's Got Talent so as not to clash with the One Love Manchester concert, Ariana Grande's benefit concert for the victims of the Manchester bombing, which will air on BBC One on 4 June. Britain's Got Talent, originally scheduled to air on that evening, will now air a day earlier. The British Soap Awards, due to air on 3 June, will air on 6 June instead.

=== June ===
Date	Event
2	Jay Hunt will step down from her role as Chief Creative Officer at Channel 4 in September, it is announced.
3	BBC Two airs Sgt Pepper's Musical Revolution with Howard Goodall, a documentary presented by Howard Goodall celebrating the 50th anniversary of the release of The Beatles album Sgt. Pepper's Lonely Hearts Club Band.
3	Canadian detective series Cardinal makes its British television debut on BBC Four.
3	Tokio Myers wins the eleventh series of Britain's Got Talent.
4	BBC One postpones a Question Time leaders debate due to air at 5.55 pm to make way for a BBC News special following the previous evening's terrorist attack in London. The programme, set to feature Scottish National Party leader Nicola Sturgeon and Liberal Democrat leader Tim Farron taking questions in Edinburgh, is rescheduled for 5 June. However, two further pre-recorded debates with the leaders of UKIP and the Green Party, and Plaid Cymru, due to air later the same evening are not rescheduled. Planned editions of The Andrew Marr Show and the Sunday Politics are cancelled in the wake of the attack.
4	The One Love Manchester concert airs live on BBC One and BBC Radio, starring Ariana Grande. Overnight viewing figures indicate it had a peak audience of 22.6 million, making it the most watched television event of 2017 to date.
7	The first series of the Channel 4 school drama Ackley Bridge premieres.
8–9	The BBC, ITV, Channel 4 and Sky News provide coverage of the results of the 2017 general election, which sees the Conservatives lose their majority, but remain the party with the largest number of seats in the House of Commons.
9	ITV announce plans for a drama about the 2015 Hatton Garden safe deposit burglary starring Timothy Spall.
13	BBC Two airs the documentary Jo Cox: Death of An MP to coincide with the first anniversary of her murder.
14	The Grenfell Tower fire dominates the news media.
14	The BBC denies reports that a scene from Planet Earth II showing a baby iguana being chased by racer snakes was faked.
15	ITV weather presenter Fred Talbot is jailed for four years for historical sex offences against boys he took on school trips to Scotland between 1978 and 1981 when he was a schoolteacher.
15	Antibiotics are voted Britain's greatest invention following a live television special, Britain's Greatest Invention on BBC Two.
15	On the eve of the first anniversary of the murder of Labour MP Jo Cox, Channel 4's late night talk show The Last Leg airs a joint video recorded by four former British Prime Ministers–John Major, Tony Blair, Gordon Brown and David Cameron–in which they pay tribute to Cox and urge people to celebrate her life.
15	A planned appearance by singer Lily Allen on the evening's edition of Newsnight is cancelled at the last minute, and following an earlier appearance on Channel 4 News in which she made outspoken remarks about the previous day's Grenfell Tower fire. The BBC says the decision to pull Allen from the programme has nothing to do with her earlier comments.
17	Billy Connolly, Julie Walters and June Whitfield are among those from the world of entertainment to be awarded in the 2017 Birthday Honours, with Connolly receiving a knighthood, and Walters and Whitfield receiving Damehoods.
17	Following the Grenfell Tower fire in London, BBC Two pulls the documentary Venice Biennale: Sink or Swim as it features artist Khadija Saye, who is correctly believed to be among those to have perished in the blaze. The opening edition of BBC One's singing contest Pitch Battle is also replaced by a different edition after the blaze, a decision taken due to song lyrics.
17	The debut edition of BBC One's Pitch Battle is seen by an average audience of 2 million viewers, while Channel 5's relaunched Blind Date is watched by 1.5 million. The second edition of ITV's The Voice Kids draws in an average 2.5 million. However, ratings are down on their usual average, something which broadcasters attribute to a heat wave being experienced by the UK.
19	Ofcom says it will not investigate an edition of Britain's Got Talent in which Amanda Holden wore a topless dress as it "would not have exceeded most viewers' expectations". The regulator received 650 complaints about the edition of the programme aired on 1 June, and 683 complaints across the series about Holden's choice of outfits.
20	The start of the BBC News at Ten is temporarily delayed by a "technical systems crash" that occurred seconds before the programme was due to go on air.
22	In what is believed to be the first such incident of its type on Question Time, a member of the audience is told to leave the programme by presenter David Dimbleby for repeatedly heckling the panel.
22	Antiques Roadshow experts believe a Fabergé ornament recently valued on the programme could be one of its most significant finds, with a value of £1million.
23	It is announced that Sean O'Connor will leave EastEnders after just a year in the role of executive producer. He will temporarily be replaced by former executive producer John Yorke.
24	John Simm reprises his role as The Master for the Doctor Who episode "World Enough and Time".
29	Culture Secretary Karen Bradley refers Rupert Murdoch's bid to take full control of Sky UK to the Competition Commission after an Ofcom report into the matter concluded that the deal could give the Murdoch family "increased influence" over the UK's news agenda.

=== July ===
Date	Event
1	The tenth series of Doctor Who concludes with an extended hour-long episode, "The Doctor Falls". The episode sees David Bradley portraying William Hartnell's First Doctor, a role he first played in the 2013 television biopic An Adventure in Space and Time.
3	Ofcom has launched an investigation into a Coronation Street storyline involving child grooming after scenes were shown before the 9.00 pm watershed. Five complaints were received about the scenes, involving the character Bethany Platt (played by Lucy Fallon) when they appeared in an omnibus edition of the soap shown on ITV2 on the morning of Saturday 3 June.
4	Plans are announced to reinvent the BBC for a new generation, including spending an extra £34 million on children's programming.
4	A BBC survey indicates that at least a third of Premier League football fans regularly view matches online through unofficial streaming services.
6	The final edition of Question Time before the summer break is interrupted by two digital alerts from presenter David Dimbleby's mobile phone, set to remind him it is bedtime.
6	Coronation Street bosses are warning fans to be aware of an online scam offering to recruit extras.
12	BBC One Wales airs Sir Gareth Edwards at 70, a birthday tribute to Welsh rugby union player Gareth Edwards. The programme is presented by Gabby Logan in front of a celebrity audience. The programme is aired nationally on BBC Two on 1 August.
13	As the government considers whether Channel 4 should relocate from London, television producer Phil Redmond launches a bid to move the broadcaster to Liverpool.
13	A recently married couple, believed to be the first same-sex couple to marry in a Muslim ceremony in the UK, are guests on ITV's This Morning.
14	The BBC unveils plans to launch a bursary scheme aimed at nurturing new female comedy talent from the North, and named in honour of the late Caroline Aherne. The launch takes place at the 2017 Salford Sitcom Showcase on 27 July.
14	A BBC One trailer reveals that the identity of the actor to play the Thirteenth Doctor in Doctor Who will be announced on the channel following the 2017 Wimbledon Men's Singles Final on 16 July.
16	Jodie Whittaker is announced as the Thirteenth Doctor, and the first woman to regularly play the role. The trailer revealing the identity of the next Doctor is watched by an estimated 4.6 million viewers. The announcement that a woman will take up the role is broadly welcomed, with those offering their support including Prime Minister Theresa May, who is described as being "pleased" by the news. The news is greeted with mixed reception from two actors who previously portrayed the role; expressing a preference for a male Doctor, Peter Davison says he feels "a bit sad" the character may no longer be "a role model for boys", comments that are dismissed as "rubbish" by his successor, Colin Baker.
19	As part of the terms of its renewed Royal Charter, the BBC publishes the earnings of celebrities on salaries over £150,000 in its annual report for 2016/17. The figures reveal that two-thirds of these are male, with Chris Evans the top earner. The revelations spark a row about the gender pay gap, and suggestions from politicians that male stars could be forced to take a pay cut.
21	ITV announces the death of Pudsey, the dog who, as part of Ashleigh and Pudsey, won the 2012 series of Britain's Got Talent.
23	Around forty of the BBC's high-profile female personalities have signed an open letter to Director-General Tony Hall urging him to "correct [the] disparity" over gender pay.
23	Mel and Sue will present a revived version of The Generation Game, which has been commissioned for an initial run of four editions, it is confirmed.
23	Singer Katherine Jenkins makes her television presenting debut as one of the main presenters of Songs of Praise.
24	The first trailer for the Doctor Who Christmas special, titled "Twice Upon a Time" is released online. The one-minute footage shows Peter Capaldi's final outing as The Doctor.
24	Milkshake! introduces a new logo.
24	The BBC announces a new music festival for 2018, which it is hoped will fill the gap left by Glastonbury, which is taking a year off. The Biggest Weekend will run from 25 to 28 May, and take place at four venues, one in each of the Home Countries. Coverage will be shown on BBC radio and television.
24	ITV2 airs the third series finale of Love Island, which is watched by an average 2.43 million viewers, giving the channel its largest audience to date.
28	Channel 4 says that its athletics series The Jump will take a break during 2018, and will not be part of its winter schedule so as not to clash with the Winter Olympics in South Korea.
28	Isabelle Warburton wins the eighteenth series of Big Brother.
29	BBC One airs the series 31 finale of Casualty, an episode notable for being the first on British television to be shot in entirely one take using a single camera.
30	The Sunday Times removes an online article amid allegations of antisemitism after columnist Kevin Myers suggested in the piece that some female BBC presenters are paid high salaries because they are Jewish. The newspaper also confirms that Myers "will not write again" for them following the comments. Myers subsequently apologises for the remarks, telling Ireland's RTÉ News that he "uttered those words out of respect for the religion".
30	Earl Spencer urges Channel 4 not to broadcast tapes of his sister, Diana, Princess of Wales discussing aspects of her personal life amid concerns it will cause distress to her children. The footage is scheduled to air as part of the documentary Diana: In Her Own Words, due for broadcast in the run up to the 20th anniversary of her death. His concerns are subsequently echoed by Royal commentators and friends of the late princess, including Rosa Monckton, who intends to write to the broadcaster urging them not to show the footage, which she says "doesn't belong in the public domain".

=== August ===
Date	Event
1	The BBC announces plans for Britain's Best Cook, a new cookery contest series for BBC One, with Claudia Winkleman as presenter and Mary Berry as one of the judges.
4	Countryfile presenter Anita Rani wades into the BBC gender pay gap controversy, claiming the issue of equal pay is also about race and class.
4	The Sun agrees to pay former EastEnders producer Sean O'Connor "substantial damages" after wrongly reporting that he had been sacked from the programme for bullying cast members.
4	Viewers are left confused after ITV4 apparently airs the wrong version of a James Bond film in its 9.00pm slot. TV listings had advertised the 2006 version of Casino Royale starring Daniel Craig as Bond, but the channel instead airs the 1967 version with David Niven as a retired Bond. The 1967 version is also aired by ITV on New Year's Eve, albeit correctly on this occasion.
6	It is reported that former Top Gear presenter Jeremy Clarkson is being treated in hospital for pneumonia after being taken ill while on holiday in Majorca.
6	The Channel 4 documentary Diana: In Her Own Words is aired, drawing their largest overnight ratings for over a year. Figures indicate the film, which includes footage of Diana, Princess of Wales discussing aspects of her marriage to Prince Charles, was watched by an average audience of 3.5 million, peaking at 4.1 million.
8	Scriptwriter Nina Raine is to write a version of Jane Austen's novel Pride and Prejudice for ITV that will be darker and more adult themed than previous versions. It is the sixth time the book has been adapted for television.
8	Sky's Soccer AM announces that its presenter Helen Chamberlain is to leave the programme after 22 years. She will be replaced by comedian Lloyd Griffith and former footballer Jimmy Bullard.
9	The BBC announces that the Radio 4 cultural review programme Front Row will be extended to television, and begin airing on BBC Two in September.
9	Fitness experts have criticised Geordie Shore starlet Charlotte Crosby for her promotion of a one-week diet plan, which they argue would have questionable results.
11	Former Vice President of the United States Al Gore appears as a guest on Channel 4's The Last Leg.
11	YouTube star Trisha Paytas quits the twentieth series of Celebrity Big Brother after eleven days, saying that being a contestant on the show was the "worst experience" of her life.
14	BBC Radio 5 Live presenter Emma Barnett makes her debut as a Newsnight presenter, providing summer cover on the BBC Two current affairs programme. She is followed on 17 August by LBC shock-jock Nick Ferrari.
15	Michael Sheen and David Tennant have been cast in a joint BBC/Amazon adaptation of the Neil Gaiman/Terry Pratchett novel Good Omens, it is announced.
16	BBC Two announce plans to move its new cooking show, The Big Family Cooking Showdown to avoid clashing with editions of The Great British Bake Off, which begins on Channel 4 on 29 August. Showdown will move from Tuesday to Thursday evenings from that date.
18	At the High Court of England and Wales, entertainer Michael Barrymore wins "more than nominal damages" against Essex Police after claiming his career was ruined as a result of his wrongful arrest on suspicion of the rape and murder of Stuart Lubbock.
18	Veteran entertainer and presenter Sir Bruce Forsyth has died aged 89, it is announced.
18	BBC Two have acquired the broadcast rights to The Assassination of Gianni Versace, the second series of the FX true crimes anthology drama series American Crime Story; the series will air in 2018.
20–23	Channel 4 airs The State, a four part drama shown over four consecutive nights which deals with a group of British Muslims who join the Islamic State of Iraq and the Levant and travel to Syria. The series wins praise from both critics and viewers.
21	The BBC announces plans for Harry Styles at the BBC, a one-off entertainment show to air in November in which Harry Styles chats to Nick Grimshaw and performs some of his songs. The programme is aired on 2 November, and features a sketch in which Styles tries his hand at bingo calling.
21	The BBC considers the idea of a permanent tribute to Sir Bruce Forsyth after some fans called for a statue of him to be installed outside a BBC building.
21	Viewers of ITV's This Morning are left moved by a segment of the show in which presenter Ruth Langsford comforts a former colleague who was left with a brain injury after suffering an anaphylactic shock when she ate a meal containing nuts while on holiday in Budapest.
23	It is announced that Sarah Smith will succeed Andrew Neil as presenter of The Sunday Politics when the programme returns on 17 September.
23	The League of Gentlemen will return to BBC Two for three one-off specials to mark the series' 20th anniversary, it is announced.
23	Following her portrayal of Cilla Black in a 2014 biopic, it is announced that Sheridan Smith has signed a record deal with East West Records to release an album.
23	Memorable edition of the ITV Lunchtime News in which a toddler runs around the studio while Alastair Stewart interviews her mother and brother for a piece about milk allergies.
24	The BBC announces it has commissioned documentaries about the Grenfell Tower fire and the murder of Stephen Lawrence.
25	Sarah Harding wins the twentieth series of Celebrity Big Brother.
27	BBC One debuts Strike – The Cuckoo's Calling, the first in a new detective series, Strike, and based on the crime novels by J. K. Rowling.
28	Channel 5 confirms Celebrity Big Brother will return in 2018, following rumours it would be axed along with the main Big Brother show. Speculation about its future had begun after Channel 5's director, Ben Frow told the Edinburgh Television Festival he "would be much happier with a channel that did not have Big Brother on it".
29	Sky UK ceases carriage of Fox News Channel, owned by Sky stakeholder 21st Century Fox, after fifteen years (the feed consisted of a near-direct simulcast of the American cable news channel, outside of commercials being replaced by Sky News forecasts and headlines). A low audience average of 2,000 daily viewers for the channel in the United Kingdom was cited for the move to discontinue offering the channel, though FNC's issues through 2017 and Rupert Murdoch clearing hurdles to acquire the remaining interest in Sky UK that he does not presently own were also cited.
29	The Great British Bake Off makes its Channel 4 debut, with a viewing audience of 5.8 million tuning in to watch the opening episode of its eighth series.

=== September ===
Date	Event
2	Missing 1960s episodes of soap opera Crossroads are shown for the first time following a discovery by Kaleidoscope, an organisation that specialises in locating missing television footage, of episodes which were thought to be lost. They were found in a vault at ITV Leeds.
2	The X Factor returns for its fourteenth series, with the opening episode achieving ratings of 6 million, the programme's lowest viewership to date.
2	Premiership Rugby makes its debut on Channel 5.
2	Sky One and Pick broadcast coverage of Game 4 Grenfell, a charity football match held at Loftus Road to raise funds for those affected by the Grenfell Tower fire.
4	ITV announces that Dancing on Ice will return in January 2018 after a four-year hiatus. It will be presented by Phillip Schofield and Holly Willoughby.
4	BBC Two airs Diana and I, a film that explores how the death of Diana, Princess of Wales affected ordinary people.
5	Good Morning Britain features an interview with therapist Dr Michael Davidson, who claims some gay people can be made straight through therapy. By the following day the segment has attracted 466 complaints to Ofcom following comments made by Davidson, who says homosexuality is "an aberration", "a sin" and "in some cases reversible".
6	ITV announces the introduction of a sixth weekly episode of Coronation Street from Wednesday 20 September, meaning the programme will air a double bill of episodes on Mondays, Wednesdays and Fridays from that date.
6	Former BBC North East and ITV Tyne Tees newsreader Mike Neville dies of cancer at the age of 80.
7	The BBC announces the full lineup for the Later...with Jools Holland 25th anniversary special, being held at the Royal Albert Hall on 21 September. Acts will include Foo Fighters, Paul Weller, Van Morrison, Dizzee Rascal, Gregory Porter, Kali Uchis, Camille, Songhoy Blues, and Jorja Smith. The special will be broadcast on BBC Two on Saturday 23 September.
9	As Strictly Come Dancing returns for a new series, openly gay comedian Susan Calman (who is one of the contestants) is forced to defend her decision to dance with a male partner after facing fierce criticism from members of the LGBT community on social media. Calman says she was offended by the criticism she received for taking part in the show, which does not have same-sex dance couples. Bosses at Strictly have not ruled out the idea of using same-sex couples at a future date.
12	Culture Secretary Karen Bradley signals her intention to refer 21st Century Fox's proposed £11.7bn takeover of Sky to the Competition and Markets Authority for further investigation amid concerns over media plurality. The merger deal is referred to the Authority on 14 September.
14	Addressing the Royal Television Society's conference in Cambridge, Karen Bradley, the Secretary of State for Culture, Media and Sport, appears to row back from government plans to move Channel 4 out of London, suggesting that not all of the broadcaster's operations would need to relocate.
14	ITV announces plans for Butterfly, a three part series about a transgender schoolgirl, with Anna Friel playing the role of the girl's mother.
14	Nate Dias and Steve Guinness win the first series of Channel 4's Lego Masters.
15	ITV have secured a deal to show coverage of the 2017 Prix de l'Arc de Triomphe.
16	BBC Two airs The A-Z of Later...with Jools Holland: From Adele to ZZ Top, a programme celebrating the diverse acts that have appeared on the programme during the quarter of a century it has been on air.
19	It is reported that Dawn French and Jennifer Saunders will reunite for a Christmas special of French and Saunders to mark the series' 30th anniversary.
20	The Detectives returns to BBC Two for a second series, this time focusing on Greater Manchester Police's Murder Investigation Team.
20	ITV announces that ITV3 will broadcast two classic episodes of Coronation Street on weekday afternoons from 2 October.
20	ITV confirms that Sheridan Smith will star in a TV special later in the year. Titled Sheridan, the one-off special will feature her performing some of the songs from her debut album, and talking about her life. The show is aired on 5 November, and features Smith being interviewed by Alexander Armstrong.
22	Greg James and A.Dot will present a new, primetime music show for BBC One to launch in October, it is announced. Sounds Like Friday Night will be the first regular mainstream music programme to air on the BBC since Top of the Pops was axed in 2006.
23	BBC One airs the first live edition of the fifteenth series of Strictly Come Dancing; overnight viewing figures indicate it was watched by an audience of 9.3 million, compared to 4.8 million for ITV's The X Factor.
23	The TV version of Front Row makes its debut on BBC Two.
24	BBC One begins airing daily highlights of the 2017 Invictus Games, held in Toronto, Ontario, Canada. The event concludes on 30 September, with the final highlights programme airing the following day.
24	BBC One airs a TV adaptation of Ian McEwan's 1987 novel The Child in Time, starring Benedict Cumberbatch and Kelly Macdonald.
26	BBC Two airs the Horizon documentary "Being Transgender", a film that looks at what it means to be transgender, and what happens when someone undergoes transitioning.
27	The Times reports that ITV is planning to launch a late night current affairs programme to rival BBC Two's Newsnight. The programme will air after News at Ten, and in direct competition to Newsnight. Nick Ferrari and Emma Barnett, who have both guest presented Newsnight are also lined up as presenters.
27	The Advertising Standards Authority has ruled that adverts for the anti-acne treatment Proactiv+ featuring actress Jorgie Porter cannot be aired during children's programmes because the advert implies that teenagers who don't use the product are more likely to be bullied.
27	The BBC releases a five-minute prequel film of its forthcoming series, Blue Planet II, with a soundtrack by Hans Zimmer and Radiohead. The trailer's release comes as the series is premiered at London's BFI IMAX cinema, with Prince William as a special guest.
27	Following the death on 25 September of Elizabeth Dawn, who played Vera Duckworth in Coronation Street for three decades, ITV dedicates the evening's Coronation Street double bill to her. It is subsequently announced that her funeral will be held at Salford Cathedral on 6 October.
27	BBC Two's Newsnight airs a 32-minute film that gives a detailed account of what happened to the residents living on the 21st floor of Grenfell Tower on the night of the fire. The film includes interviews with six of the survivors.
28	Rita Ora is confirmed as host of the 2017 MTV Europe Music Awards, which will be held in London for the first time in two decades.
28	The tenth series of ITV's dating game show Take Me Out will feature two specials, one where a female contestant picks a date and one involving contestants over the age of 50, it is reported. The series is scheduled to return in 2018.
30	Launch of Saturday Mash-Up! on BBC Two and CBBC, a new Saturday morning children's TV show that will attempt to recapture the spirit of classic BBC programmes such as Going Live! and Live & Kicking.

=== October ===
Date	Event
1	Launch of the BBC Three series Overshadowed, a drama made up of a series of vlog posts that tackles the topic of eating disorders.
2	Twenty years after the final episode of The Brittas Empire was aired, the sitcom's cast reunite for the reopening of Ringwood Health and Leisure Centre, after the location where the series was filmed underwent an eleven-week refurbishment.
2	Gold HD is launched by UKTV.
3	Former chief crown prosecutor Nazir Afzal expresses his concern about a scene in Coronation Street that showed a victim of grooming being sketched by a court artist at the trial of her abuser. Under English law all victims of sex crimes are granted lifelong anonymity, and Afzal fears the scene that depicted Bethany Platt (Lucy Fallon) being drawn by the artist could discourage victims of grooming from coming forward.
5	Keeley Hawes is to play a female Home Secretary in a new six part BBC drama titled Bodyguard, it is announced.
8	While presenting her Sunday morning show for BBC Berkshire, Strictly Come Dancing contestant Debbie McGee accidentally reveals the identity of the latest participant to leave the series (Richard Coles), hours before the results show is broadcast. The results programme is recorded after the Saturday live show, then broadcast the following evening. Ruth Langsford makes a similar mistake the following weekend by revealing that she has made it through to the next round before the results show has been aired.
9	Country singer Dolly Parton has been signed up to read a children's story for CBeebies, as part of the channel's Imaginative Library project; she will read Louise Yates's Dog Loves Books on 25 October.
10	Sir Bruce Forsyth is honoured by the National Television Awards, which announces it has renamed its entertainment prize after him.
10	Tom Baker has returned to his role as the Fourth Doctor to complete the unfinished 1979 Doctor Who story "Shada", it is reported. Outdoor footage had been filmed for the story, scheduled to be the final part of the programme's seventeenth season, but it was abandoned after strike action prevented studio scenes being completed. The story will be released by BBC Worldwide. The project is completed by November, with animation and voiceover used for the missing scenes, as well as a live action scene in which Baker reprises his role.
10	BBC director of news James Harding announces he will stand down from the role at the beginning of 2018.
11	Singer Olly Murs confirms he is joining the judging panel on the next series of The Voice.
11	The British Academy of Film and Television Arts suspends US film producer Harvey Weinstein's membership following allegations of sexual misconduct.
12	Friday 27 October is confirmed as the start date of BBC One's new music show, Sounds Like Friday Night, with Jason Derulo co-presenting the first edition, as well as performing on that show. Other artists who will appear on the series include Liam Payne, Liam Gallagher, Jessie Ware and Foo Fighters.
13	An advert for the CoppaFeel charity, which raises awareness of breast cancer, makes broadcasting history by showing a nipple on television before the 9.00pm watershed for the first time. The ad, which shows people using touch to check their own breasts, as well as touching other objects, is previewed on ITV's Good Morning Britain before airing during commercial breaks throughout the day from Monday 16 October.
16	Channel 4 airs the documentary George Michael: Freedom, a film George Michael was at work on at the time of his death in December 2016. The documentary focuses on the period leading up to and immediately after the release of his 1990 album Listen Without Prejudice Vol. 1, and coincides with the album's re-release. The album reaches number one on the UK Albums Chart on 27 October – 27 years after having previously topped the charts in 1990.
17	The BBC announces that its primetime Crimewatch programme is being axed after 33 years, but says the daytime show Crimewatch Roadshow will continue to air.
17	Essity launch an ad campaign for Bodyform featuring sanitary pads stained with red liquid, rather than blue, making Bodyform the first product of its type to be advertised with a more realistic appearance.
18	An advert for Skinny Tan, a self-tanning product launched in 2013 with the help of investment from Dragons' Den entrepreneurs Kelly Hoppen and Piers Linney is banned by the Advertising Standards Agency after it was deemed misleading. The ad claimed the product was the first tanning product to be made with natural ingredients, and could reduce the appearance of cellulite, but the ASA found that these claims could not be proven.
19	The British Film Institute strips Harvey Weinstein of his membership following allegations of sexual misconduct.
20	Strictly Come Dancing confirms that judge Bruno Tonioli will miss the weekend's shows because of "a very busy work schedule", the first time he has been absent from the judging panel since the programme's launch.
20	Mary Berry, Mel Giedroyc and Sue Perkins are to present a Christmas special for the BBC titled Mary, Mel and Sue's Surprise Party in which they will visit a community centre in South Wales.
20	Sources including BBC News report that a project has begun to repair and preserve puppets owned by Cosgrove Hall, which were used in popular children's TV series such as Danger Mouse, Count Duckula, Terry Pratchett's Truckers and Noddy's Toyland Adventures. The puppets were put into storage after their respective series ended, and in some cases have been packed away for several decades.
20	The Muslim Council of Britain expresses concern about the Channel 4 documentary My Week As a Muslim in which a white woman with anti-Muslim views is dressed as a Pakistani Muslim, even using prosthetic brown skin to make her appearance look genuine. The MCB says the programme is well intentioned, but that it would have advised Channel 4 against it.
21	BBC News reports that before beginning work on Coronation Street, its creator, Tony Warren started writing a script for another soap. But while, like its more famous counterpart, Seven, Bessie Street was set in a row of terraced houses, the series had a very different narrative. The script is part of an exhibition on show at Salford Museum and Art Gallery, and dedicated to Warren.
21	BBC One airs the first episode of Gunpowder, a drama about the 1605 Gunpowder Plot. The episode attracts seven complaints to Ofcom because of violent scenes involving execution. In defence, the BBC says the scenes are "grounded in historical fact", and reflect events that were happening at the time.
22	The Only Way Is Essex star Gemma Collins presents the BBC Radio 1 Teen Award for Best TV Show to Love Island and, after announcing the winner, falls through an opening in the stage.
23	The BBC confirms that Jodie Whittaker's Thirteenth Doctor will be joined by three companions–Bradley Walsh, who will play Graham, Tosin Cole, who will play Ryan, and Mandip Gill, who will play Yasmin.
24	Konnie Huq, Anthea Turner, Mark Curry, Diane-Louise Jordan, Tim Vincent and Radzi Chinyanganya will take part in a special Blue Peter version of Strictly Come Dancing for Children in Need to air on 17 November.
24	Tamzin Outhwaite will return to EastEnders in early 2018, reprising her role as Melanie Owen, the character having last been seen in April 2002.
25	Apple hires former BBC One Controller and Channel 4 Chief Executive Jay Hunt to join its video team.
25	Labour Party leader Jeremy Corbyn is to appear in a special edition of Channel 4's Gogglebox in order to raise money for Stand Up to Cancer.
25	The Advertising Standards Authority rules that reality television star Marnie Simpson broke advertising rules by posting images on Snapchat of products in which she has a business interest, without identifying them as adverts.
26	Tim Peake, a former crew member on the International Space Station, appears as a guest on ITV's This Morning, where he is asked by guest host Amanda Holden if, when he "went to the moon, did you take a piece of the moon and bring it back home with you?".
27	Olivia Colman will succeed Claire Foy in the role of Queen Elizabeth II in the Netflix biographical series The Crown. Colman will play an older version of the Queen from 2019, as the series tells the story of her life.
27	ITV announces some changes to the live element of this year's series of The X Factor. The sing-off between the two lowest scoring contestants is scrapped, with the judges no longer participating in the decision about who is eliminated from the process. One contestant will leave on each show (i.e., Saturday and Sunday evening) rather than each weekend, and the winning contestants of each weekend's shows will also compete for a "money can't buy" prize.
28	ITV issues a statement following a number of viewer complaints about the level of violence in the previous evening's double bill of Coronation Street, aired before the 9.00pm watershed. The scenes saw kidnap victim Andy Carver (played by Oliver Farnworth) shoot fellow hostage Vinny Ashford (Ian Kelsey), before being killed himself by their captor, Pat Phelan (Connor McIntyre). Phelan is then seen to dispose of the bodies in a lake. In its defence, ITV says that the character "has already been established as a villain [and] so his actions, evil though they are, won't have come as a surprise to viewers [but] the programme is always careful to limit the level of violence actually shown to a minimum to convey the drama and tell the story".
28	To celebrate the 20th anniversary of the release of Harry Potter and the Philosopher's Stone, the first book in the Harry Potter series, BBC Two presents the documentary Harry Potter and the World of Magic, in which author J. K. Rowling discusses her inspiration for the books, among them being the 1975 film The Man Who Would Be King, whose use of Masonic symbology she claims inspired the symbol of the Deathly Hallows.
29	ITV confirms that Bruno Langley, who has played Todd Grimshaw in Coronation Street since 2001, has left the series following an internal inquiry over allegations he assaulted a woman in a bar. Langley subsequently faces criminal charges over the incident.
29	Blue Planet II debuts on BBC One, where overnight figures suggest it is watched by an average 10.3 million viewers.
31	Sophie Faldo wins the eighth series of The Great British Bake Off. The result is accidentally revealed by Prue Leith ten hours before the final episode is broadcast, an error she attributes to being in Bhutan and mixing up her time zones. But in spite of this, the final attracts an average viewership of 7.3 million, rising to 7.7 million, and representing Channel 4's highest overnight figures since 2012. Some Freeview report being unable to see the final because of signal disruption. Freeview says this is down to high weather pressure.
31	Newsnight editor Ian Katz has been appointed as director of programmes at Channel 4, it is announced.
31	25th anniversary of the broadcast of the controversial BBC One film Ghostwatch.

=== November ===
Date	Event
1	S4C celebrate their 35th anniversary.
1	Cartoonito begins using 16:9 widescreen.
2	Channel 4 and Countdown both celebrate their 35th anniversaries.
2	BBC Director-General Tony Hall warns that the emergence of companies such as Netflix, Amazon and Apple as forces in television production, coupled with falls in advertising revenues for commercial broadcasters poses a threat to the future of British made programming, with the amount spent on production in the UK decreasing by as much as £500m annually over the next decade.
3	The second edition of Sounds Like Friday Night sees Dizzee Rascal replace scheduled guest Liam Gallagher at the last minute after the latter is told to rest his voice by doctors.
5	The Commercial Broadcasters Association (COBA), the body for international broadcasters in the UK, warns that Brexit may force TV firms to move some operations abroad if there is no trade deal when Britain leaves the European Union.
5	The BBC says it has extended its contract with the Met Office to supply weather information to March 2018, after Meteogroup, the provider set to replace the Met Office failed to be ready in time. Meteogroup was originally scheduled to take over from the Met Office in Spring 2017.
7	Judy Murray, Kimberly Walsh, Colin Jackson, Robbie Savage, Katie Derham and Jeremy Vine are among guests confirmed for the 2017 Strictly Come Dancing Christmas Special.
7	In an interview with the Radio Times, television presenter Anne Robinson describes how older people need to be "clever and thin" to be on television, and how she is "permanently on a diet".
8	Sky says it will close Sky News if the news channel proves to be an obstacle in News Corporation's bid to takeover Sky.
8	Netflix officially confirm that the crime drama Top Boy, originally cancelled by Channel 4 in 2014, has been re-commissioned for a third series in 2019, produced by Canadian rapper Drake.
9	BBC One airs Sam Smith at the BBC featuring singer Sam Smith.
9	Former Scottish First Minister Alex Salmond is to host a political talk show each Thursday on Russian broadcaster RT, it is announced.
9	The BBC News channel celebrates its 20th anniversary.
10	BBC One pulls the drama Agatha Christie's Ordeal by Innocence from the Christmas schedule after one of the stars, Ed Westwick was accused of rape. The BBC says the drama will not be broadcast "until these matters are resolved".
10	Netflix have acquired the international broadcasting rights to Trump: An American Dream, a four part Channel 4 documentary about the life of Donald Trump that was aired earlier in the year.
14	Officials at 10 Downing Street have launched an investigation after a female television producer told the Radio Times she was groped by a male government minister following a visit to the property for meeting about a TV programme while David Cameron was prime minister.
14	Following three viewer complaints that the 2017 Marks & Spencer Christmas ad contains the word "fuck", the commercial is cleared for broadcast by the Advertising Standards Agency. The advert, made to tie in with the release of the film Paddington 2 and which premiered on 7 November, features Paddington Bear helping a bearded burglar return Christmas gifts he has stolen after mistaking him for Santa Claus. The burglar then says "Thank you, little bear", which was misheard by some viewers as "Fuck you, little bear".
16	The Alex Salmond Show makes its debut on RT UK. The first edition features an interview with President of Catalonia Carles Puigdemont and a discussion about LGBT issues.
17	BBC One and BBC Two broadcast Children in Need 2017, with highlights including a special celebrity edition of The Weakest Link presented by Anne Robinson, and a teaser for the 2017 Doctor Who Christmas special. The telethon raises £50.1m, surpassing the 2016 total.
17	Kezia Dugdale, a former leader of the Scottish Labour Party, is announced as a last minute contestant for ITV's I'm a Celebrity...Get Me Out of Here!. It is subsequently reported that she faces disciplinary action from the Labour Party for not making party managers aware she will be out of the country on non-work related business while the Scottish parliament is in session. On 21 November, the party says that she will not be suspended. She makes her first appearance on the programme on 22 November. Dugdale becomes the second person to be evicted from the show, after eleven days in the jungle. She receives a written warning from Labour regarding the episode upon her return to Scotland in mid December.
17	Peter Kay announces that his Peter Kay's Car Share will return for a finale in 2018.
19	Songs of Praise presenter Aled Jones has voluntarily agreed not to appear on the BBC while the broadcaster holds an investigation into allegations he sent inappropriate messages to a woman more than a decade ago, it is reported. Jones apologises for any upset caused by his behaviour, which he says can be "occasionally juvenile". In January 2018, the BBC confirms the presenter, last heard on air in October, will return to his presenting roles.
20	The death is reported of British cameraman Mark Milsome, who was killed while filming a stunt for the BBC series The Forgiving Earth in Ghana.
20	ITV magazine programme This Morning goes off air for twelve minutes due to technical problems.
21	Channel 4 will air two episodes of The Great British Bake Off as part of its festive line up, each featuring four former contestants who will compete to be overall champion.
21	The BBC announce that the fourth BBC Music Awards will be scaled-back with no awards ceremony held. The awards will now be included as part of The Year in Music 2017, a new studio-based BBC Two programme hosted by Claudia Winkleman and Clara Amfo on 8 December.
21	YouTube star Jack Maynard, a contestant on the seventeenth series of I'm a Celebrity...Get Me Out of Here!, leaves the programme after The Sun newspaper prints offensive Twitter posts he made in 2012. Maynard subsequently apologises for the remarks, which he attributes to being "young" and "careless".
21	Radio and television presenter Reggie Yates apologises after his use of the term "fat Jewish guy" during a recent podcast in which he was discussing the music industry.
23	An edition of BBC One's Question Time being recorded at Colchester Town Hall is cut short after a member of the audience collapses, requiring medical treatment. The programme, which usually runs for an hour, is concluded after forty minutes as the woman who was taken ill cannot be safely removed by paramedics. It is later broadcast in its shorter format.
23	Reality television personality Jeremy McConnell is jailed for eighteen weeks after missing community service work in order to get a beard transplant.
24	Channel 4 apologises after a clip from the US sitcom Black-ish that includes a joke about the 1993 Shankill Road bombing in Belfast was posted to its Facebook page. The post, concerning an episode of the series broadcast on E4 the previous week, is also removed.
25	It is reported that former television presenter John Leslie has been charged with sexually assaulting a woman following allegations of an incident at an Edinburgh nightclub. In June 2018 Leslie is cleared of the charges after the case is found to be not proven following a two-day trial at Edinburgh Sheriff Court.
27	Following the announcement that Prince Harry is to marry his fiancée Meghan Markle in 2018, the couple give a filmed interview to the BBC's Mishal Husain that airs on the evening's BBC Six O'Clock News.
30	Following its use in this year's John Lewis Christmas ad, it is reported that author Chris Riddell's book Mr Underbed has enjoyed a boost in sales, prompting the book's publisher to print another 10,000 copies.

=== December ===
Date	Event
1	Strictly Come Dancing singer Tommy Blaize releases his debut album, Life & Soul, featuring covers of classic soul tracks.
3	Boy band Rak-Su win the fourteenth series of The X Factor, becoming the first boy band to be named as winners in the series' history.
4	Reggie Yates steps down from his Top of the Pops presenting role following comments he made during a podcast.
5	BBC News at Ten apologises after using clips of the wrong actor in a news story about the death of Shashi Kapoor.
5	James Dixon, an officer with Thames Valley Police who appeared on the Sky One documentary series Road Wars, is killed when his motorcycle is in collision with a car near Hare Hatch, Berks.
6	BBC Radio 1 presenter Clara Amfo will replace Reggie Yates as presenter on the Top of the Pops Christmas and New Year specials after Yates stepped down from the role.
7	The Belfast Telegraph reports that Channel 4 has issued a "Derry glossary" ahead of the start of its new comedy series Derry Girls in order to help viewers understand some of the Northern Irish lingo used by the characters. The series begins on 4 January 2018.
8	Jack Whitehall is confirmed as presenter of the 2018 Brit Awards, which will take place at The O2, London, and will be broadcast live on ITV.
10	Georgia Toffolo wins the seventeenth series of I'm a Celebrity...Get Me Out of Here!.
12	The Duke and Duchess of Cambridge are awarded gold Blue Peter badges for their campaign work involving mental health issues affecting children.
12	ITV commissions Victoria for a third series.
14	The Walt Disney Company agrees a $52.4bn (£39bn) deal to buy the majority of 21st Century Fox from Rupert Murdoch, which includes Fox's 39% share in Sky.
15	Sky and BT sign a deal to share their channels on both platforms.
15	Fran Unsworth, the current director of the BBC World Service Group and deputy director of news and current affairs at the BBC, is appointed as the BBC's director of news and current affairs, replacing James Harding who steps down from the role in early 2018.
16	Joe McFadden and dance partner Katya Jones win the fifteenth series of Strictly Come Dancing.
17	Distance runner Sir Mo Farah is named this year's BBC Sports Personality of the Year.
17	James White and Sarah Lynn both win the thirteenth series of The Apprentice, the first time Lord Sugar has chosen both finalists as business partners.
17	The death is reported of actor Terence Beesley, who died suddenly at his home in Somerset in late November.
18	BBC Two announce plans for a documentary about the Harvey Weinstein scandal. The film will be directed by Ursula Macfarlane.
19	PBS and BBC News announce that the US network has acquired the rights to simulcast Beyond 100 Days and World News Today starting from 2 January 2018. From 22 December to 1 January the programme and Outside Source is replaced by an edition of World News Today.
20	BBC Two airs the series four finale of Peaky Blinders, confirming the drama will return for a fifth series in 2019.
21	Craig Johnston wins the tenth series of Masterchef: The Professionals, becoming the youngest contestant to secure the title.
21	Ivy Watson wins Cycle 12 of Britain's Next Top Model.
25	Jodie Whittaker makes her debut as the Thirteenth Doctor in the Christmas Day special of Doctor Who.
25	Channel 4's Alternative Christmas message is delivered by children who survived the Grenfell Tower fire, who urge viewers to "love and cherish" their families.
26	Overnight viewing figures indicate The Queen's Christmas Message was the most watched TV programme on Christmas Day, with 7.6 million viewers. Mrs. Brown's Boys was second with 6.8 million, followed by Strictly Come Dancing with 6.5 million and Call the Midwife with 6.3 million. The Christmas Day special of EastEnders was fifth, meaning BBC One has won the annual festive ratings battle. ITV's highest rating programme was Coronation Street with 4.8 million viewers, which is seventh, coming a place below Jodie Whittaker's Doctor Who debut, seen by an audience of 5.7 million.
26	ITV airs the network television premiere of Jurassic World.
27	A Coronation Street storyline sees the character Alya Nazir (played by Sair Khan) being subjected to racist abuse, with the episode going on to attract a mixed response from viewers. While some praise the storyline for raising the issue, others complain that it is offensive. Speaking to BBC News the following day, Khan says that she suggested the story to the series' producers because she wanted to highlight the topic.
28	Figures released by Ofcom indicate that Good Morning Britain to be the programme that attracted the most viewer complaints during 2017.
29	A Radio Times poll of TV critics names Blue Planet II as the best programme of 2017.
29	BBC One shows the network television premiere of Gone Girl, David Fincher's 2014 adaptation of Gillian Flynn's psychological thriller of the same name.
30	Those from the world of television to receive recognition in the 2018 New Year Honours include Strictly Come Dancing judge Darcey Bussell who becomes a Dame, actor Hugh Laurie who receives a CBE, and presenter Eamonn Holmes who is awarded an OBE.
30	The government announces plans to make available an extra £60m to encourage broadcasters to produce more home grown children's programming.
30	Figures released by the BBC indicate that its Action Line service for sexual abuse support was contacted by more than 127,000 callers in 2017, and following dramas such as Three Girls and Apple Tree Yard.
30	Channel 5 airs the first live network television broadcast of a Premiership Rugby match as it airs footage of The Big Game (rugby union)#Big Game 10 between Harlequins and the Northampton Saints at Twickenham. Mark Durden-Smith is the presenter, while commentary is provided by Conor McNamara, David Flatman and Paul Grayson.
31	BBC One welcomes in 2018 with a concert by Nile Rodgers and Chic, celebrating their 40th anniversary. The show pauses at midnight for the Chimes of Big Ben and fireworks display.

== Debuts ==
=== BBC ===
Date	Debut	Channel
1 January	Thailand: Earth's Tropical Paradise	BBC Two
2 January	Impossible	BBC One
2 January	CBBC Visits the Wizarding World of Harry Potter and Fantastic Beasts	CBBC
3 January	Revolting	BBC Two
3 January	Yellowstone: Wildest Winter to Blazing Summer	BBC Two
4 January	Italy's Invisible Cities	BBC One
7 January	Let It Shine	BBC One
7 January	Taboo	BBC One
7 January	David Bowie: The Last Five Years	BBC Two
11 January	Hospital	BBC Two
11 January	Common Sense	BBC Two
12 January	Spy in the Wild	BBC One
22 January	Apple Tree Yard	BBC One
23 January	Numberblocks	CBeebies
23 January	100 Days (now Beyond 100 Days)	BBC Four / BBC News Channel
26 January	British History's Biggest Fibs with Lucy Worsley	BBC Four
6 February	SAS: Rogue Warriors	BBC Two
7 February	The Moorside	BBC One
8 February	This Country	BBC Three
8 February	Roots	BBC Four
13 February	Remotely Funny	CBBC
19 February	SS-GB	BBC One
22 February	Incredible Medicine: Dr Weston's Casebook	BBC Two
24 February	The Secrets of Your Food	BBC Two
27 February	Mary Berry Everyday	BBC Two
27 February	Meet the Lords	BBC Two
28 February	The Replacement	BBC One
28 February	1066: A Year to Conquer England	BBC Two
5 March	Clique	BBC Three
9 March	Just a Couple	BBC Three
13 March	Fugitives	BBC One
13 March	My Life: New Boys in Town	CBBC
17 March	Wild Ireland: The Edge of the World	BBC Two
18 March	Happy 100th Birthday Dame Vera Lynn	BBC Two
25 March	All Round to Mrs. Brown's	BBC One
26 March	Turkey with Simon Reeve	BBC Two
27 March	Holding Back the Years	BBC One
27 March	The Repair Shop	BBC Two
27 March	Amazing Hotels: Life Beyond the Lobby	BBC Two
28 March	Gravity and Me: The Force that Shapes Our Lives	BBC Four
30 March	Galapagos	BBC One
31 March	Decline and Fall	BBC One
5 April	Second Chance Summer: Tuscany	BBC Two
5 April	Me and My Dog: The Ultimate Contest	BBC Two
11 April	Our Friend Victoria	BBC One
12 April	Reported Missing	BBC One
13 April	Bucket	BBC Four
13 April	The World According to Kids	BBC Two
21 April	Hospital People	BBC One
22 April	The Playlist	CBBC
24 April	The Boss	BBC One
1 May	Amsterdam: An Art Lovers' Guide	BBC Four
3 May	Trust Me, I'm a Vet	BBC Two
4 May	Can't Cope, Won't Cope	BBC Three
7 May	Babs	BBC One
7 May	Mexico: Earth's Festival of Life	BBC Two
7 May	Dara & Ed's Road to Mandalay	BBC Two
7 May	Queer Britain	BBC Three
8 May	A1: Britain's Longest Road	BBC One
10 May	King Charles III	BBC Two
16 May	Three Girls	BBC One
18 May	Kat & Alfie: Redwater	BBC One
24 May	White Gold	BBC Two
25 May	Paula	BBC Two
28 May	The Life Swap Adventure	BBC Two
28 May	Paul Hollywood's Big Continental Road Trip	BBC Two
30 May	Broken	BBC One
30 May	The Chillenden Murders	BBC Two
1 June	The Great Village Green Crusade	BBC Four
4 June	One Love Manchester	BBC One
5 June	The Secret Life of the Hospital Bed	BBC One
5 June	Cosby: Fall of an American Icon	BBC Two
8 June	Frankie Boyle's New World Order	BBC Two
12 June	The Art of Japanese Life	BBC Four
12 June	Handmade in Japan	BBC Four
13 June	Ryan Gander: The Idea of Japan	BBC Four
13 June	Jo Cox: Death of an MP	BBC Two
15 June	Britain's Greatest Invention	BBC Two
17 June	Pitch Battle	BBC One
19 June	Curious Creatures	BBC Two
23 June	Tracey Breaks the News	BBC One
28 June	The Week the Landlords Moved In	BBC One
3 July	The Betrayed Girls	BBC One
11 July	In the Dark	BBC One
11 July	The British Garden: Life and Death on Your Lawn	BBC Four
17 July	Letterbox	BBC Two
17 July	Nadiya's British Food Adventure	BBC Two
18 July	Addicted Parents: Last Chance to Keep My Children	BBC Two
19 July	The Sweet Makers	BBC Two
20 July	The Mash Report	BBC Two
22 July	Ill Behaviour	BBC iPlayer
23 July	Wild Alaska Live	BBC One
24 July	Wild	BBC One
26 July	Against the Law	BBC Two
27 July	Prejudice and Pride: The People's History of LGBTQ Britain	BBC Four
29 July	Queer as Art	BBC Two
31 July	Man in an Orange Shirt	BBC Two
31 July	Queers	BBC Four
8 August	Trust Me	BBC One
14 August	The Zoo	CBBC
15 August	The Big Family Cooking Showdown	BBC Two
15 August	Quacks	BBC Two
16 August	Saving Lives at Sea	BBC Two
16 August	No More Boys and Girls	BBC Two
19 August	Partners in Rhyme	BBC One
20 August	Astronauts: Do You Have What It Takes?	BBC Two
20 August	Britain's Forgotten Men	BBC Three
27 August	Strike	BBC One
30 August	World's Busiest Cities	BBC Two
31 August	Sex Map of Britain	BBC Three
4 September	Richard Osman's House of Games	BBC Two
4 September	Diana and I	BBC Two
11 September	Rellik	BBC One
11 September	Beyond 100 Days	BBC Four & BBC News Channel
13 September	The Other One	BBC Two
16 September	Even Better Than the Real Thing	BBC One
20 September	Famalam	BBC Two
20 September	The Detectives: Murder on the Streets	BBC Two
24 September	The Child in Time	BBC One
25 September	The Vietnam War	BBC Four
25 September	The Human Body: Secrets of Your Life Revealed	BBC Two
28 September	Russia with Simon Reeve	BBC Two
30 September	Saturday Mash-Up!	CBBC & BBC Two
30 September	Britain Afloat	BBC Two
1 October	The Last Post	BBC One
1 October	Overshadowed	BBC Three
2 October	Pablo	CBeebies
6 October	Porridge	BBC One
6 October	Nile Rodgers How To Make It in the Music Business	BBC Four
9 October	A Matter of Life and Debt	BBC One
13 October	Ronny Chieng: International Student	BBC Three
14 October	Lucy Worsley's Nights at the Opera	BBC Two
18 October	Army: Behind the New Frontlines	BBC Two
19 October	The Ganges with Sue Perkins	BBC One
21 October	Gunpowder	BBC One
27 October	Sounds Like Friday Night	BBC One
27 October	Tracey Breaks the News	BBC One
29 October	Blue Planet II	BBC One
30 October	Getting the Builders In	BBC One
30 October	Fugitives	BBC One
30 October	Nigella: At My Table	BBC Two
31 October	Creeped Out	CBBC
6 November	Dennis & Gnasher: Unleashed!	CBBC
12 November	Howards End	BBC One
13 November	The Boy With The Topknot	BBC Two
14 November	Drugsland	BBC Three
16 November	Love, Lies & Records	BBC One
20 November	Armchair Detectives	BBC One
22 November	Mary Berry's Country House Secrets	BBC One
4 December	Island Medics	BBC One
4 December	The Hairy Bikers Home for Christmas	BBC One
16 December	Feud	BBC Two
24 December	Mary, Mel and Sue's Big Christmas Thank You	BBC One
25 December	The Highway Rat	BBC One
26 December	Little Women	BBC One
26 December	The Miniaturist	BBC One
26 December	Reindeer Family & Me	BBC Two
27 December	Alan Partridge: Why, When, Where, How and Whom?	BBC Two
30 December	A Christmas Carol Goes Wrong	BBC One

=== ITV ===
Date	Debut	Channel
2 January	The Halcyon	ITV
5 January	Save Money: Good Health	ITV
6 January	Britain's Best Walks with Julia Bradbury	ITV
7 January	The Opening Show	ITV4
8 January	2Awesome	ITV2
8 January	Dance Dance Dance	ITV
10 January	Martin Clunes: Islands of Australia	ITV
13 January	Tina and Bobby	ITV
30 January	James Martin's French Adventure	ITV
31 January	Tales from the Coast with Robson Green	ITV
5 February	Lion Country: Night and Day	ITV
5 February	The Good Karma Hospital	ITV
16 February	Mafia Women with Trevor McDonald	ITV
21 February	Britain's Busiest Motorway	ITV
24 February	Phillip Schofield's South African Adventure	ITV
27 February	The Home Game	ITV
27 February	The Nightly Show	ITV
28 February	The Secret Chef	ITV
1 March	Little Big Shots	ITV
2 March	Harry Hill's Alien Fun Capsule	ITV
2 March	Prime Suspect 1973	ITV
5 March	5 Gold Rings	ITV
27 March	Harlots	ITV Encore
4 April	Save Money: Good Food	ITV
10 April	Devon and Cornwall Cops	ITV
17 April	Culinary Genius	ITV
18 April	Don't Ask Me Ask Britain	ITV
20 April	Joanna Lumley's Postcards	ITV
20 April	The Detectives: Inside the Major Crimes Team	ITV
23 April	Bigheads	ITV
24 April	Little Boy Blue	ITV
1 May	Babushka	ITV
6 May	The Keith & Paddy Picture Show	ITV
5 June	Lord Lucan: My Husband, the Truth	ITV
10 June	The Voice Kids	ITV
11 June	The Loch	ITV
11 June	Love Island: Aftersun	ITV2
12 June	Amazing Animal Births	ITV
12 June	Fearless	ITV
15 June	The Real Full Monty	ITV
15 June	CelebAbility	ITV2
26 June	David Dickinson's Name Your Price	ITV
30 June	The Secret World of Posh Pets	ITV
5 July	Joanna Lumley's India	ITV
13 July	Eat, Shop, Save	ITV
27 July	Inside London Fire Brigade	ITV
11 August	Teach My Pet To Do That	ITV
14 August	easyJet: Inside the Cockpit	ITV
17 August	The Brighton Police	ITV
30 August	Love Your Home and Garden	ITV
2 September	Saturday Morning with James Martin	ITV
2 September	The Family Chase	ITV
2 September	Cannonball	ITV
4 September	Dress to Impress	ITV2
11 September	Liar	ITV
12 September	Robson Green's Coastal Lives	ITV
14 September	Bromans	ITV2
20 September	Bad Move	ITV
4 October	Celebrity Showmance	ITV2
9 October	After the News	ITV
9 October	Timewasters	ITV2
12 October	An Hour to Catch a Killer with Trevor McDonald	ITV
13 October	Australian Wilderness with Ray Mears	ITV
19 October	Gordon Ramsay on Cocaine	ITV
22 October	Your Song	ITV
27 October	Bear's Mission	ITV
30 October	The Harbour	ITV
13 November	Gone To Pot	ITV
15 November	Tamara's World	ITVBe
28 November	How to Spend it Well at Christmas	ITV
11 December	Bancroft	ITV
24 December	All Star Musicals	ITV

=== Channel 4 ===
Date	Debut	Channel
2 January	First Dates Hotel	Channel 4
5 January	Spies	Channel 4
8 January	Walking the Americas	Channel 4
6 February	The Fake News Show	Channel 4
16 February	Inside Dior	More4
20 February	The Trouble with Dad	Channel 4
22 February	The Royal House of Windsor	Channel 4
23 February	Gap Year	E4
26 February	Rivers with Jeremy Paxman	Channel 4
27 February	Game of Clones	E4
2 March	Extremely British Muslims	Channel 4
6 March	How'd You Get So Rich?	Channel 4
6 March	Mutiny	Channel 4
23 March	Three Wives, One Husband	Channel 4
12 April	My Online Nightmare	Channel 4
19 April	How to Live Mortgage Free with Sarah Beeny	Channel 4
19 April	Confessions of a Junior Doctor	Channel 4
20 April	Born to Kill	Channel 4
30 April	Escape to Costa Rica	Channel 4
8 May	Loaded	Channel 4
9 May	Elizabeth	Channel 4
14 May	Hunted America	All 4
21 May	The Trial: A Murder in the Family	Channel 4
28 May	The Handmaid's Tale	Channel 4
7 June	Ackley Bridge	Channel 4
19 June	Vlogglebox	E4
22 June	Host the Week	Channel 4
24 June	Pop, Pride and Prejudice	More4
3 July	Binky & JP's Baby: Born in Chelsea	E4
21 July	Maxxx	Channel 4
4 August	The Secret Life of the Holiday Resort	Channel 4
5 August	Paul O'Grady's Hollywood	Channel 4
14 August	Cheap Cheap Cheap	Channel 4
15 August	Delhi Cops	Channel 4
16 August	Made Over By	E4
20 August	From Russia to Iran: Crossing Wild Frontiers	Channel 4
20 August	The State	Channel 4
21 August	All Gardens Great and Small	More4
24 August	Lego Masters	Channel 4
29 August	Married to a Celebrity: The Survival Guide	Channel 4
6 September	Back	Channel 4
10 September	Bang	S4C
13 September	My Hotter Half	E4
13 September	999: On the Frontline	More4
17 September	Electric Dreams	Channel 4
18 September	All Star Driving School	E4
25 September	Celebrity Psych Test	E4
1 October	Escape	Channel 4
9 October	Steph and Dom's One Star to Five Star	Channel 4
12 October	GameFace	E4
24 October	The End of the F***ing World	Channel 4
9 November	Trump: An American Dream	Channel 4
26 November	Coastal Railways with Julie Walters	Channel 4

=== Channel 5 ===
Date	Debut	Channel
3 January	A New Life in Oz	Channel 5
9 January	The Week We Went Wild	Channel 5
11 January	Celebrity 100% Hotter	Channel 5
12 January	Get Your Tatts Out: Kavos Ink	Channel 5
7 February	Secrets of the National Trust	Channel 5
7 February	Celebrity Carry On Barging	Channel 5
8 February	Climbing the Property Ladder	Channel 5
10 February	Cruising with Jane McDonald	Channel 5
13 February	Railways That Built Britain with Chris Tarrant	Channel 5
16 February	When Kids Kill: Schoolboy Slayer	Channel 5
17 March	Tony Robinson: Coast to Coast	Channel 5
20 March	Traffic Cops: Under Attack	Channel 5
21 March	Yorkshire: A Year in the Wild	Channel 5
23 March	The Last Days of George Michael	Channel 5
29 March	One Night with My Ex	Channel 5
30 March	Rich House, Poor House	Channel 5
31 March	Spectacular Spain with Alex Polizzi	Channel 5
19 April	Badass Brides	5Star
27 April	Baby Ballroom	5Star
1 May	The Miranda Hart Story	Channel 5
8 May	Mind the Age Gap	Channel 5
9 May	Elizabeth I	Channel 5
6 June	Our Dream Hotel	Channel 5
9 June	Biggest Dog in the World	Channel 5
17 June	Before They Were Stars	Channel 5
6 July	Circus Kids: Our Secret World	Channel 5
7 August	Make or Break?	Channel 5
23 August	Starting Up, Starting Over	Channel 5
30 August	Nightmare New Builds	Channel 5
3 September	My Secret Sex Fantasy	Channel 5
11 September	Paddington Station 24/7	Channel 5
16 September	Alaska: A Year in the Wild	Channel 5
29 September	Britain by Bike with Larry & George Lamb	Channel 5
29 September	A Celebrity Taste of Italy	Channel 5
13 October	Bad Habits, Holy Orders	Channel 5
27 October	Eight Days that Made Rome	Channel 5
20 November	Sinkholes	Channel 5
20 November	Oxford Street Revealed	Channel 5

=== Other channels ===
Date	Debut	Channel
2 January	Celebrity Fat Fighters	TLC
8 January	The Big Spell	Sky One
15 January	Freddie Down Under	Sky One
19 January	Urban Myths	Sky Arts
17 March	Oasis	Amazon Video
22 March	Dr Christian Will See You Now	W
31 March	Carters Get Rich	Sky One
3 April	Just Tattoo of Us	MTV
5 April	Henry IX	Gold
13 April	Guerrilla	Sky Atlantic
14 April	Ronnie's Redneck Road Trip	Dave
22 April	Micky Flanagan Thinking Aloud	Sky One
5 May	Jamestown	Sky One
15 May	Go 8 Bit: DLC	Dave
18 May	A Tale of Two Sisters	Yesterday
15 June	Riviera	Sky Atlantic
23 June	Free Rein	Netflix
24 June	Ben Phillips Blows Up	Comedy Central
21 August	Sunny Day	Nick Jr.
4 September	The Davina Hour	W
7 September	Tin Star	Sky Atlantic
17 September	Justice: Qalb Al Adala	OSN Ya Hala Al Oula
21 September	The Russell Howard Hour	Sky One
22 September	Jack Whitehall: Travels with My Father	Netflix
6 October	Sing: Ultimate A Cappella	Sky One
9 October	OK K.O.! Let's Be Heroes	Cartoon Network
25 October	Bounty Hunters	Sky One
2 November	Living the Dream	Sky One
7 November	Sick Note	Sky One
11 November	Murder on the Blackpool Express	Gold
13 November	Don't Say It, Bring It	Dave
20 November	Royal Ranch	Disney Channel
27 November	The Hurting	Dave

== Channels and streaming services ==
=== New channels ===
Date	Channel
4 February	ITV Box Office
15 March	Quest Red
11 August	Geo Kahani
31 August	FreeSports
2 October	Gold HD

=== Defunct channels ===
Date	Channel
11 August	Geo Tez
1 November	Flava

== Television shows ==
=== Changes of network affiliation ===
Show	Moved from	Moved to
Classic Coronation Street	Plus	ITV3
The National Lottery Draws	BBC One	BBC iPlayer
Eurovision: You Decide	BBC Four	BBC Two
Line of Duty	BBC Two	BBC One
The Cheltenham Festival	Channel 4	ITV & ITV4
The Grand National	Channel 4	ITV & ITV4
Chester's May Festival	Channel 4	ITV & ITV4
The Epsom Derby	Channel 4	ITV & ITV4
Royal Ascot	Channel 4	ITV & ITV4
Glorious Goodwood	Channel 4	ITV & ITV4
The Ebor Festival	Channel 4	ITV & ITV4
Other Horse Racing Programmes	Channel 4	ITV & ITV4
The Great British Bake Off	BBC One & BBC Two	Channel 4
The Great British Bake Off: An Extra Slice	BBC One & BBC Two	Channel 4
BDO World Darts Championship	BBC One & BBC Two	Channel 4
The Voice UK	BBC One	ITV
The Worst Witch	CITV	CBBC
Blind Date	ITV	Channel 5
Don't Tell the Bride	Sky One	E4
The Price Is Right	ITV	Channel 4
60 Minute Makeover	ITV	Quest Red
Empire	E4	5Star
8 Out of 10 Cats	More4	E4
Hogan's Heroes	ITV4	Forces TV
Thomas & Friends	Nick Jr.	Cartoonito

=== Returning this year after a break of one year or longer ===
Programme	Date(s) of original removal	Original channel(s)	Date of return	New channel(s)
ITV Racing	5 October 1985	ITV	1 January 2017	ITV & ITV4
The Worst Witch	26 January 2001; 27 January 2007	CITV	11 January 2017	CBBC
Piers Morgan's Life Stories	11 December 2015	ITV	3 February 2017	N/A (same as original)
Blind Date	31 May 2003	ITV	17 June 2017	Channel 5
World News America	25 March 2011	BBC News Channel	2017	N/A (same as original)
The Crystal Maze	10 August 1995 (Original Series); 16 October 2016 (Stand Up to Cancer Special)	Channel 4	23 June 2017	N/A (same as original)
CBBC on BBC Two	4 January 2013	BBC Two	30 September 2017	N/A (same as original)
Classic Coronation Street	1 November 2004	Plus	2 October 2017	ITV3
Dennis & Gnasher: Unleashed!	20 December 2013	CBBC	6 November 2017	N/A (same as original)
The Weakest Link	31 March 2012	BBC One & BBC Two	17 November 2017	N/A (same as original)
The Price Is Right	12 January 2007	ITV	30 December 2017	Channel 4

== Continuing television shows ==
=== 1920s ===
Programme	Date
BBC Wimbledon	(1927–1939, 1946–2019, 2021–present)

=== 1930s ===
Programme	Date
Trooping the Colour	1937–1939, 1946–2019, 2023–present
The Boat Race	1938–1939, 1946–2019, 2021–present

=== 1950s ===
Programme	Date
Panorama	1953–present
Eurovision Song Contest	1956–2019, 2021–present
The Sky at Night	1957–present
Final Score	1958–present(part of Grandstand, 1958–2001)
Blue Peter	1958–present

=== 1960s ===
Programme	Date
Coronation Street	1960–present
Maigret	1960–1963, 1992–1993, 2016–present
Points of View	1961–present
Songs of Praise	1961–present
University Challenge	1962–1987, 1994–present
Doctor Who	1963–1989, 1996, 2005–present
Horizon	1964–present
Match of the Day	1964–present
Top of the Pops	1964–present
Gardeners' World	1968–present
A Question of Sport	1968, 1970–present

=== 1970s ===
Programme	Date
Emmerdale	1972–present
Mastermind (including Celebrity Mastermind)	1972–1997, 2003–present
Newsround	1972–present
Football Focus	1974–present
Pobol y Cwm	1974–present
Porridge	1974–1977, 2016–present
Arena	1975–present
One Man and His Dog	1976–present
Top Gear	1977–present
Ski Sunday	1978–present
Antiques Roadshow	1979–present
Question Time	1979–present

=== 1980s ===
Programme	Date
Children in Need	1980–present
Danger Mouse	1981–1992, 2015–present
Countdown	1982–present
ITV Breakfast	1983–present
Good Morning Britain	1983–1992, 2014–present
Thomas & Friends	1984–present
EastEnders	1985–present
Watchdog	1985–present
Comic Relief	1985–present
Catchphrase	1986–2002, 2013–present
Casualty	1986–present
Fifteen to One	1988–2003, 2013–present
Red Dwarf	1988–1999, 2009, 2012–present
This Morning	1988–present
Countryfile	1988–present

=== 1990s ===
Programme	Date
Have I Got News for You	1990–present
The Crystal Maze	1990–1995, 2016–present
MasterChef	1990–2001, 2005–present
ITV News Meridian	1993–present
Junior MasterChef	1994–1999, 2010–present
Room 101	1994–2007, 2012–present
Top of the Pops 2	1994–present
Hollyoaks	1995–present
Soccer AM	1995–present
Silent Witness	1996–present
Classic Coronation Street	1996–2006, 2017–present
Midsomer Murders	1997–present
Robot Wars	1997–2004, 2016–present
Teletubbies	1997–2002, 2007–2009, 2012, 2015–present
Y Clwb Rygbi	1997–present
Cold Feet	1998–2003, 2016–present
British Soap Awards	1999–2019, 2022–present
Holby City	1999–2022
Loose Women	1999–present

=== 2000s ===
Programme	Date
2000
Big Brother (including Celebrity Big Brother)	2000–present
Bargain Hunt	2000–present
BBC Breakfast	2000–present
Click	2000–present
Doctors	2000–present
A Place in the Sun	2000–present
The Unforgettable	2000–2002, 2010–present
Unreported World	2000–present
2001
BBC South East Today	2001–present
Rogue Traders	2001–present (part of Watchdog 2009–present)
2002
Animal Park	2002–2009, 2016–present
Escape to the Country	2002–present
Flog It!	2002–present
I'm a Celebrity...Get Me Out of Here!	2002–present
Inside Out	2002–present
Most Haunted	2002–2010, 2014–present
River City	2002–2026
Saturday Kitchen	2002–present
2003
Daily Politics	2003–present
QI	2003–present
This Week	2003–present
Eggheads	2003–present
Extraordinary People	2003–present
Grumpy Old Men	2003–present
Homes Under the Hammer	2003–present
Traffic Cops	2003–present
2004
Doc Martin	2004–2019
Match of the Day 2	2004–present
Strictly Come Dancing	2004–present
The X Factor	2004–2018
The Big Fat Quiz of the Year	2004–present
The Culture Show	2004–present
Football First	2004–present
The Gadget Show	2004–present
Live at the Apollo	2004–present
NewsWatch	2004–present
SadlerVision	2004–present
Strictly Come Dancing: It Takes Two	2004–present
Who Do You Think You Are?	2004–present
2005
8 out of 10 Cats	2005–present
Coach Trip	2005–2006, 2009–present
The Andrew Marr Show	2005–present
The Adventure Show	2005–present
The Apprentice	2005–present
Dragons' Den	2005–present
The Hotel Inspector	2005–present
The Jeremy Kyle Show	2005–present
Mock the Week	2005–present
Pocoyo	2005–present
Springwatch	2005–present
2006
The Album Chart Show	2006–present
Animal Spies!	2006–present
The Apprentice: You're Fired!	2006–present
Banged Up Abroad	2006–present
Cricket AM	2006–present
Dickinson's Real Deal	2006–present
Don't Get Done, Get Dom	2006–present
Horrid Henry	2006–present
Monkey Life	2006–present
Not Going Out	2006–present
The One Show	2006–present
People & Power	2006–present
Peschardt's People	2006–present
The Secret Millionaire	2006–2008, 2010–present
2007
Britain's Got Talent	2007–present
Would I Lie to You?	2007–present
Benidorm	2007–present
The Big Questions	2007–present
Don't Tell the Bride	2007–present
The Graham Norton Show	2007–present
Heir Hunters	2007–present
Helicopter Heroes	2007–present
Inspector George Gently	2007–present
London Ink	2007–present
Shaun the Sheep	2007–present
Real Rescues	2007–present
The Hot Desk	2007–present
2008
An Là	2008–present
Big & Small	2008–present
Celebrity Juice	2008–present
Chuggington	2008–present
Only Connect	2008–present
Put Your Money Where Your Mouth Is	2008–present
Police Interceptors	2008–present
Rubbernecker	2008–present
Seachd Là	2008–present
2009
Pointless	2009–present
The Chase	2009–present
Countrywise	2009–present
Cowboy Trap	2009–present
Four Weddings	2009–present
Piers Morgan's Life Stories	2009–present
Rip Off Britain	2009–present

=== 2010s ===
Programme	Date
2010
Dinner Date	2010–present
The Great British Bake Off	2010–present
Great British Railway Journeys	2010–present
A League of Their Own	2010–present
Little Crackers	2010–present
Lorraine	2010–present
Luther	2010–present
The Only Way Is Essex	2010–present
Sherlock	2010–present
Sunday Morning Live	2010–present
Take Me Out	2010–2020
2011
All Over the Place	2011–present
The Amazing World of Gumball	2011–present
Black Mirror	2011–present
Episodes	2011–2017
Four Rooms	2011–present
Horrible Histories: Gory Games	2011–2018
Junior Bake Off	2011–present
Made in Chelsea	2011–present
Match of the Day Kickabout	2011–present
Ross Kemp: Extreme World	2011–2017
Sam & Mark's Big Friday Wind-Up	2011–present
Show Me What You're Made Of	2011–present
Sun, Sex and Suspicious Parents	2011–present
Trollied	2011–present
Vera	(2011–2025)
2012
4 O'Clock Club	2012–present
Endeavour	2012–present
Call the Midwife	2012–present
Great Continental Railway Journeys	2012–present
Prisoners' Wives	2012–present
The Syndicate	2012–present
Stella	2012–present
Stand Up To Cancer	2012–present
The Voice UK	2012–present
Naomi's Nightmares of Nature	2012–present
Tipping Point	2012–present
Paul O'Grady: For the Love of Dogs	2012–2023
Last Tango in Halifax	2012–present
Operation Ouch!	2012–present
Claimed and Shamed	2012–present
Wolfblood	2012–present
2013
The Dumping Ground	2013–present
Blandings	2013–present
Dani's Castle	2013–present
Absolute Genius with Dick and Dom	2013–present
Broadchurch	2013–2017
Caught Red Handed	2013–present
Officially Amazing	2013–present
Count Arthur Strong	2013–2017
Shetland	2013–present
Big Star's Little Star	2013–2018
The Dog Rescuers	2013–present
Still Open All Hours	2013–present
Two Doors Down	2013, 2016–present
2014
Agatha Raisin	2014–present
Boomers	2014–present
The Dog Ate My Homework	2014–present
The Jump	2014–present
Collage and Service: Meets G & G1	2014–present
Detectorists	2014–2017
The Great Interior Design Challenge	2014–present
The Great British Bake Off: An Extra Slice	2014–present
Happy Valley	2014–present
Holiday of My Lifetime	2014, 2016–present
Tyger Takes On...	2014–present
Educating Joey Essex	2014–present
The Fifteen Billion Pound Railway	2014–2017
In the Club	2014–present
Weekend	2014–2017
Chasing Shadows	2014–present
Judge Rinder	2014–present
Grantchester	2014–present
Paul O'Grady's Animal Orphans	2014–present
Weekend Escapes with Warwick Davis	2014–present
Scrambled!	2014–present
W1A	2014–2017
Who's Doing the Dishes?	2014–present
24 Hours in Police Custody	2014–present
GPs: Behind Closed Doors	2014–present
2015
The Almost Impossible Gameshow	2015–present
CBBC Official Chart Show	2015–2017
Chewing Gum	2015–2017
The Dengineers	2015–present
Doctor Foster	2015–present
Eve	2015–present
The Frankenstein Chronicles	2015–present
The Great Pottery Throw Down	2015–present
Hetty Feather	2015–present
Hive Minds	2015–present
Hoff the Record	2015–present
Hunted	2015–present
In Therapy	2015–present
Josh	2015–2017
Jeremy Kyle Emergency Room	2015–present
The Kyle Files	2015–present
Michael McIntyre's Big Show	2015–present
Ninja Warrior UK	2015–present
Nightmare Tenants, Slum Landlords	2015–present
No Offence	2015–present
Peter Kay's Car Share	2015–2018
Play to the Whistle	2015–2017
Poldark	2015–present
Real Stories with Ranvir Singh	2015–present
Rebound	2015–present
Safe House	2015–present
SAS: Who Dares Wins	2015–present
The Saturday Show	2015–present
Scream Street	2015–present
Simply Nigella	2015–present
So Awkward	2015–present
Special Forces: Ultimate Hell Week	2015–present
Taskmaster	2015–present
Thunderbirds Are Go	2015–present
Victoria Derbyshire	2015–present
Wild & Weird	2015–present
10,000 BC	2015–present
Eat Well for Less?	2015–present
2016
The A Word	2016–present
All Over the Workplace	2016–present
Alphabetical	2016–present
Bake Off: The Professionals	2016–present
Borderline	2016–present
Cash Trapped	2016–2017, 2019–
Class Dismissed	2016–present
The Code	2016–2017
The Crown	2016–present
The Cruise	2016–present
Dara O Briain's Go 8 Bit	2016–2018
Debatable	2016–present
The Durrells	2016–present
Eden	2016–2017
Got What It Takes?	2016–present
Insert Name Here	2016–present
The Level	2016–present
Maigret	2016–present
Marcella	2016–present
Masterpiece	2016–present
Mum	2016–present
Naked Attraction	2016–present
No Such Thing as the News	2016–present
Peter Kay's Comedy Shuffle	2016–2017
Peston on Sunday	2016–present
The Premier League Show	2016–present
The Question Jury	2016–2017
Spot Bots	2016–present
Stan Lee's Lucky Man	2016–2018
Tenable	2016–present
This Time Next Year	2016–2019
Top Class	(2016–present)
Tribes, Predators & Me	2016–2017
Unspun with Matt Forde	2016–present
Upstart Crow	2016–present
Victoria	2016–present
We Have Been Watching	2016–2017
The Windsors	2016–present
Witless	2016–2018
Zapped	2016–2018

== Ending this year ==
Date(s)	Programme	Channel(s)	Debut(s)
4 January	Pop Quiz	BBC One / Red TV / Vintage TV / BBC Four	1981
7 January	The National Lottery Draws	BBC One	1994
8 January	Eve	CBBC	2015
15 January	Thailand: Earth's Tropical Paradise	BBC Two	2017
27 January	Tina and Bobby	ITV	2017
1 February	We Have Been Watching	Gold	2016
3 February	Spy in the Wild	BBC One	2017
5 February	Zack & Quack	Nick Jr.	2014
6 February	Apple Tree Yard	BBC One	2018
9 February	Chewing Gum	E4	2015
12 February	Uncle	BBC Three / BBC One	2014
14 February	The Moorside	BBC One	2017
14 February	Everything's Rosie	CBeebies	2010
17 February	CBBC Official Chart Show	CBBC	2015
20 February	The Halcyon	ITV	2017
25 February	Let It Shine	BBC One	2017
26 February	The Big Spell	Sky One	2017
12 March	The Jump	Channel 4	2014
13 March	Meet the Lords	BBC Two	2017
14 March	1066: A Year to Conquer England	BBC Two	2017
14 March	The Replacement	BBC One	2017
17 March	Tracey Ullman's Show	BBC One	2016
19 March	SS-GB	BBC One	2017
20 March	Crimewatch	BBC One	1984
23 March	Little People	Cartoonito / Tiny Pop	2016
29 March	Postman Pat	BBC One / BBC Two / CBeebies / Tiny Pop	1981
4 April	Play to the Whistle	ITV	2015
13 April	Gap Year	E4	2017
17 April	Broadchurch	ITV	2013
23 April	The Nightly Show	ITV	2017
5 May	Carters Get Rich	Sky One	2017
9 May	Second Chance Summer: Tuscany	BBC Two	2017
11 May	Born to Kill	Channel 4	2017
12 May	Nick Kicks	Nickelodeon	2016
14 May	Escape to Costa Rica	Channel 4	2017
15 May	Little Boy Blue	ITV	2017
18 May	Three Girls	BBC One	2017
18 May	Guerrilla	Sky Atlantic	2017
23 May	Don't Ask Me Ask Britain	ITV	2017
23 May	Elizabeth I	Channel 5	2017
25 May	The Trial: A Murder in the Family	Channel 4	2017
28 May	Bigheads	ITV	
29 May	The Fifteen Billion Pound Railway	BBC Two	2014
22 June	Kat & Alfie: Redwater	BBC One	2017
30 June	Mount Pleasant	Sky One	2011
4 July	Broken	BBC One	2017
13 July	100 Days/100 Days +	BBC Four / BBC News Channel	2017
14 July	Count Arthur Strong	BBC Two / BBC One	2013
15 July	Wife Swap	Channel 4	2003 & 2017
16 July	The Loch	ITV	2017
17 July	Fearless	ITV	2017
22 July	Pitch Battle	BBC One	2017
30 July	Wild Alaska Live	BBC One	2017
1 August	In the Dark	BBC One	2017
11 August	Eden	Channel 4	2016
11 August	The Question Jury	Channel 4	2016
12 August	Ross Kemp: Extreme World	Sky One	2011
1 September	Cash Trapped	ITV	2016
3 September	Weekend	ITV	2014
19 September	Quacks	BBC Two	2017
1 October	Overshadowed	BBC Three	2017
12 October	Russia with Simon Reeve	BBC Two	2017
16 October	Rellik	BBC One	2017
20 October	Nile Rodgers How To Make It in the Music Business	BBC Four	2017
21 October	Lucy Worsley's Nights at the Opera	BBC Two	2017
23 October	W1A	BBC Two	2014
28 October	The Furchester Hotel	CBeebies	2014
30 October	Inspector George Gently	BBC One	2007
2 November	Bromans	ITV2	2017
3 November	The Lodge	Disney Channel	2016
4 November	Gunpowder	BBC One	2017
5 November	The Last Post	BBC One	2017
6 November	Josh	BBC Three / BBC One	2015
17 November	Gone To Pot	ITV	2017
20 November	Royal Ranch	Disney Channel	2017
3 December	Howards End	BBC One	2017
10 December	Blue Planet II	BBC One	2017
13 December	Detectorists	BBC Four	2014
15 December	Sarah & Duck	CBeebies	2013
17 December	Coastal Railways with Julie Walters	Channel 4	2017
19 December	Dave Gorman: Modern Life is Goodish	Dave	2013
27 December	The Miniaturist	BBC One	2017
28 December	Little Women	BBC One	2017

== Deaths ==
Date	Name	Age	Broadcast credibility
2 January	Brian Widlake	85	Journalist and broadcaster (The Money Programme, The World at One)
3 January	Rodney Bennett	81	Television director (Doctor Who)
17 January	Philip Bond	82	Actor (Doctor Who, The Onedin Line, The Life and Adventures of Nicholas Nickleby)
23 January	Gorden Kaye	75	Actor ('Allo 'Allo!, Brazil, Coronation Street)
25 January	Sir John Hurt	77	Actor (Sodor's Legend of the Lost Treasure, Midnight Express, Alien, The Elephant Man, The Black Cauldron, Red Fox, Thumbelina, Doctor Who)
26 January	David Rose	92	Television producer (Z-Cars, Softly, Softly), founder of Film4
1 February	Desmond Carrington	90	Actor (Emergency – Ward 10) and radio broadcaster
6 February	Alec McCowen	91	Actor (A Night to Remember, Henry V, Gangs of New York)
8 February	Alan Simpson	87	Writer (Hancock's Half Hour, Comedy Playhouse, Steptoe and Son)
8 February	Tara Palmer-Tomkinson	45	Socialite and television presenter (I'm a Celebrity: Extra Camp, Animals Do the Funniest Things)
12 February	Sara Coward	69	Actress (Inspector Morse, Hetty Wainthropp Investigates, Rumpole of the Bailey)
20 February	Stephen Rhodes	66	Radio broadcaster, television presenter and voiceover (This Morning, Family Fortunes)
25 February	Neil Fingleton	36	Actor (Game of Thrones, 47 Ronin, Doctor Who)
28 February	James Walker	76	Actor (Nineteen Eighty-Four, Empire of the Sun, Danny, Champion of the World)
9 March	Ann Beach	78	Actress (Fresh Fields, Notting Hill)
9 March	Jane Freeman	81	Actress (Last of the Summer Wine)
10 March	John Forgeham	75	Actor (Footballers' Wives, The Italian Job, Kiss of the Dragon, Crossroads)
10 March	Tony Haygarth	72	Actor (El C.I.D., Chicken Run, Where the Heart Is, Emmerdale, Dracula)
17 March	Robert Day	94	Television and film director (The Green Man, First Man into Space, Two-Way Stretch, The Rebel)
7 April	Christopher Morahan	87	Television and stage director (The Jewel in the Crown, Emergency Ward 10)
7 April	Tim Pigott-Smith	70	Actor (Winston Churchill: The Wilderness Years, Fame Is the Spur, The Jewel in the Crown, The Chief, Bloody Sunday, Gangs of New York, V for Vendetta, 37 Days)
8 April	Brian Matthew	88	Radio broadcaster and television presenter (Thank Your Lucky Stars)
10 April	David Parry-Jones	83	Broadcaster, sports commentator and writer (BBC Wales Today)
10 April	Margaret Towner	96	Actress (Derek, Star Wars: Episode I – The Phantom Menace)
16 April	Rosemary Frankau	84	Actress (Terry and June)
17 April	Sean Scanlan	68	Actor (The Tales of Para Handy, Rab C. Nesbitt)
2 May	Moray Watson	88	Actor (Rumpole of the Bailey, The Darling Buds of May)
5 May	Michael Wearing	78	Television producer (Edge of Darkness, Boys from the Blackstuff)
10 May	Geoffrey Bayldon	93	Actor (Worzel Gummidge, Catweazle, Magic Grandad, Casino Royale, Dracula)
23 May	Sir Roger Moore	89	Actor (The Spy Who Loved Me, The Persuaders!, The Saint)
24 May	David Bobin	71	Sports broadcaster (Sky Sports)
28 May	John Noakes	83	Television presenter (Blue Peter, Go With Noakes)
30 May	Molly Peters	75	Actress (Thunderball)
1 June	Roy Barraclough	81	Actor (Sez Les, Dawson's Weekly, Les Dawson Show, Coronation Street)
2 June	Peter Sallis	96	Actor (Last of the Summer Wine, Wallace and Gromit, The Wind in the Willows)
5 June	Andy Cunningham	67	puppeteer and actor (Bodger & Badger)
12 June	Sam Beazley	101	Actor (Harry Potter and the Order of the Phoenix, Johnny English)
19 June	Brian Cant	83	Narrator (Camberwick Green, Trumpton, Chigley, Jay Jay the Jet Plane), actor (Dappledown Farm, and television presenter (Play School)
27 June	Michael Bond	91	Writer (The Herbs, Paddington Bear)
30 June	Barry Norman	83	Film critic and television presenter (Film...)
3 July	Joe Robinson	90	Actor (Diamonds Are Forever, The Loneliness of the Long Distance Runner, Thor and the Amazon Women)
4 July	Carol Lee Scott	74	Actress and singer (Grotbags)
15 July	William Hoyland	73	Actor (Bill Brand, Hellboy, For Your Eyes Only)
16 July	Trevor Baxter	84	Actor (Doctor Who, Sky Captain and the World of Tomorrow, Maelstrom) and playwright
21 July	Deborah Watling	69	Actress (Doctor Who)
25 July	Hywel Bennett	73	Actor (The Virgin Soldiers, Shelley, EastEnders, The Bill)
27 July	Robert Anker	27	Dancer (former member of Diversity, winners of the 2009 series of Britain's Got Talent)
28 July	Rosemary Anne Sisson	93	Writer (Upstairs, Downstairs)
3 August	Robert Hardy	91	Actor (All Creatures Great and Small, Winston Churchill: The Wilderness Years, Harry Potter)
13 August	Victor Pemberton	85	Writer and television producer (Doctor Who, Fraggle Rock, The Adventures of Black Beauty)
18 August	Sir Bruce Forsyth	89	Entertainer and presenter (Sunday Night at the London Palladium, The Generation Game, Takeover Bid, Play Your Cards Right, The Price Is Right, You Bet!, Didn't They Do Well, Strictly Come Dancing)
18 August	Liz MacKean	52	Journalist (Newsnight)
6 September	Mike Neville	80	Broadcaster (BBC North East and Cumbria, ITV Tyne Tees)
7 September	Terence Harvey	72	Actor (Hollyoaks, From Hell, The Phantom of the Opera)
17 September	Suzan Farmer	75	Actress (The Scarlet Blade, Doctor in Clover, Coronation Street)
21 September	William G. Stewart	84	Television presenter and producer (Fifteen to One)
25 September	Tony Booth	85	Actor (Till Death Us Do Part, Coronation Street)
25 September	Liz Dawn	77	Actress (Coronation Street, Emmerdale)
25 September	Bobby Knutt	71	Comedian and actor (The Comedians, Emmerdale, Benidorm)
28 September	Benjamin Whitrow	80	Actor (Pride and Prejudice, Chicken Run, Quadrophenia)
11 October	Trevor Byfield	73	Actor (The Bill, Yesterday's Dreams, GoldenEye)
16 October	Kevin Cadle	62	Sports broadcaster (Sky Sports) and basketball coach
16 October	Roy Dotrice	94	Actor (Amadeus, A Moon for the Misbegotten)
16 October	Sean Hughes	51	Comedian (Never Mind the Buzzcocks, Sean's Show) and actor (The Last Detective)
21 October	Rosemary Leach	81	Actress (A Room with a View, The Roads to Freedom, The Plague Dogs)
22 October	Patricia Llewellyn	55	Television producer (The Naked Chef, Ramsay's Kitchen Nightmares), BAFTA (2001, 2005, 2008) and Emmy winner (2006).
2 November	Paddy Russell	89	Television director (Doctor Who, Out of the Unknown, The Omega Factor)
4 November	Dudley Simpson	95	Composer (Doctor Who, Blake's 7)
8 November	Antonio Carluccio	80	Chef (Two Greedy Italians)
8 November	Tim Gudgin	87	Radio presenter and voiceover artist (Grandstand, Final Score)
8 November	Pat Hutchins	75	Illustrator, author and actress (Rosie and Jim, Titch)
9 November	Bill Cashmore	56	Actor and playwright (The Bill, Brass Eye, Knightmare, All Creatures Great and Small, Fist of Fun)
15 November	Keith Barron	83	Actor (Duty Free, Upstairs, Downstairs, The Nigel Barton Plays)
21 November	Rodney Bewes	79	Actor (The Likely Lads, Whatever Happened to the Likely Lads?) and writer (Dear Mother...Love Albert)
23 November	Anthony Harvey	87	Director (The Lion in Winter) and film editor (Dr. Strangelove, Lolita)
30 November	Terence Beesley	60	Actor (EastEnders, The Phantom of the Opera, War & Peace)
30 November	Alfie Curtis	87	Actor (Star Wars, The Elephant Man)
5 December	Meic Povey	67	Actor and playwright (Minder, A Mind to Kill, Pobol y Cwm)
11 December	Keith Chegwin	60	Television presenter (Cheggers Plays Pop, It's a Knockout) and actor (Macbeth)
11 December	Suzanna Leigh	72	Actress (Paradise, Hawaiian Style)
15 December	Heinz Wolff	89	Scientist and television presenter (The Great Egg Race)
16 December	Sharon Laws	43	Professional cyclist and part of ITV4's commentary team for the channel's coverage of the 2017 Women's Tour.
23 December	Leon Bernicoff	83	Reality show participant (Gogglebox)
31 December	Doreen Keogh	93	Actress (Coronation Street, The Royle Family, Father Ted)

== See also ==
- 2017 in British music
- 2017 in British radio
- 2017 in the United Kingdom
