= EasyJet: Inside the Cockpit =

British documentary miniseries

- Genre: Documentary mini-series
- Directed by: Katy Lock; David Waterman; Kosta Papanicolas; Eddie Stafford
- Narrated by: Stephen Fry
- Country of origin: United Kingdom
- Original language: English
- No. of seasons: 2
- No. of episodes: 6

Production
- Producer: Dan Grabiner
- Cinematography: Spencer Franks
- Camera setup: Multi-camera
- Running time: 46 – 60 min

Original release
- Network: ITV
- Release: 14 August 2017 – 16 May 2019

EasyJet: Inside the Cockpit is a British documentary miniseries featuring EasyJet crew members and their careers. The series was narrated by Stephen Fry and was aired on the British television network ITV. It aired from 14 August 2017 until 16 May 2019.

The series features new cadet pilot candidates while training to become EasyJet first officers.
