= Coastal Railways with Julie Walters =

- Genre: Documentary
- Directed by: Kim Maddever
- Presented by: Julie Walters
- Country of origin: United Kingdom
- Original language: English
- No. of series: 1
- No. of episodes: 4

Production
- Executive producer: Paul Sommers
- Producer: Martin Cass
- Running time: 48 minutes
- Production company: Alaska Productions

Original release
- Network: Channel 4
- Release: 26 November – 17 December 2017

Coastal Railways with Julie Walters is a British television programme on Channel 4 presented by actress Julie Walters that first aired on 26 November 2017. A re-edited version combining the first two episodes and entitled Scotland's Coastal Railways with Julie Walters was broadcast on 10 January 2021.

== History ==
Julie Walters introduces the programmes telling of her own love of the coast. Each episode features Walters travelling for five days on a coastal railway in Britain, experiencing the landscapes and its people.

The series' first distribution in the United States took place in July 2018, on the video streaming service Acorn TV, and in 2019 it aired on Public Broadcasting Service (PBS) network stations.

== List of episodes ==
No. in series	Title	Directed by	Original release date	UK viewers (millions)
1	"West Highland Railway"	Kim Maddever	26 November 2017	2.43
After starting on the Caledonian Canal, Walters travels along Scotland's West Highland Railway over the Glenfinnan Viaduct on her way to visit Mallaig and the Isle of Skye.
2	"The East Coast Line"	Kim Maddever	3 December 2017	2.12
Walters travels along the East Coast Main Line from Newcastle to Edinburgh. She sees a branch line being reinstated to Alnwick, meets beachcombers near Berwick-Upon-Tweed, visits one of "the world's most extreme caravan parks" with impressive sea views, goes fishing for lobsters, then discovers the secrets of the Balmoral Hotel in Edinburgh.
3	"The Great Western Road"	Kim Maddever	10 December 2017	N/A
Walters travels along the Great Western Main Line and some of its branch lines built by Isambard Kingdom Brunel in Devon and Cornwall. She visits RNLI at St. Ives, and hears about smuggling history in Polperro and a haunted castle in Kingswear.
4	"Wales to Liverpool"	Kim Maddever	17 December 2017	N/A
Walters travels from Aberystwyth in Wales to Liverpool. She visits a historical railway in Tywyn, takes the Ffestiniog railway up Snowdonia, takes a zip-wire ride and visits Europe's biggest pet cemetery.
