= Len Goodman =

English ballroom dancer (1944–2023)

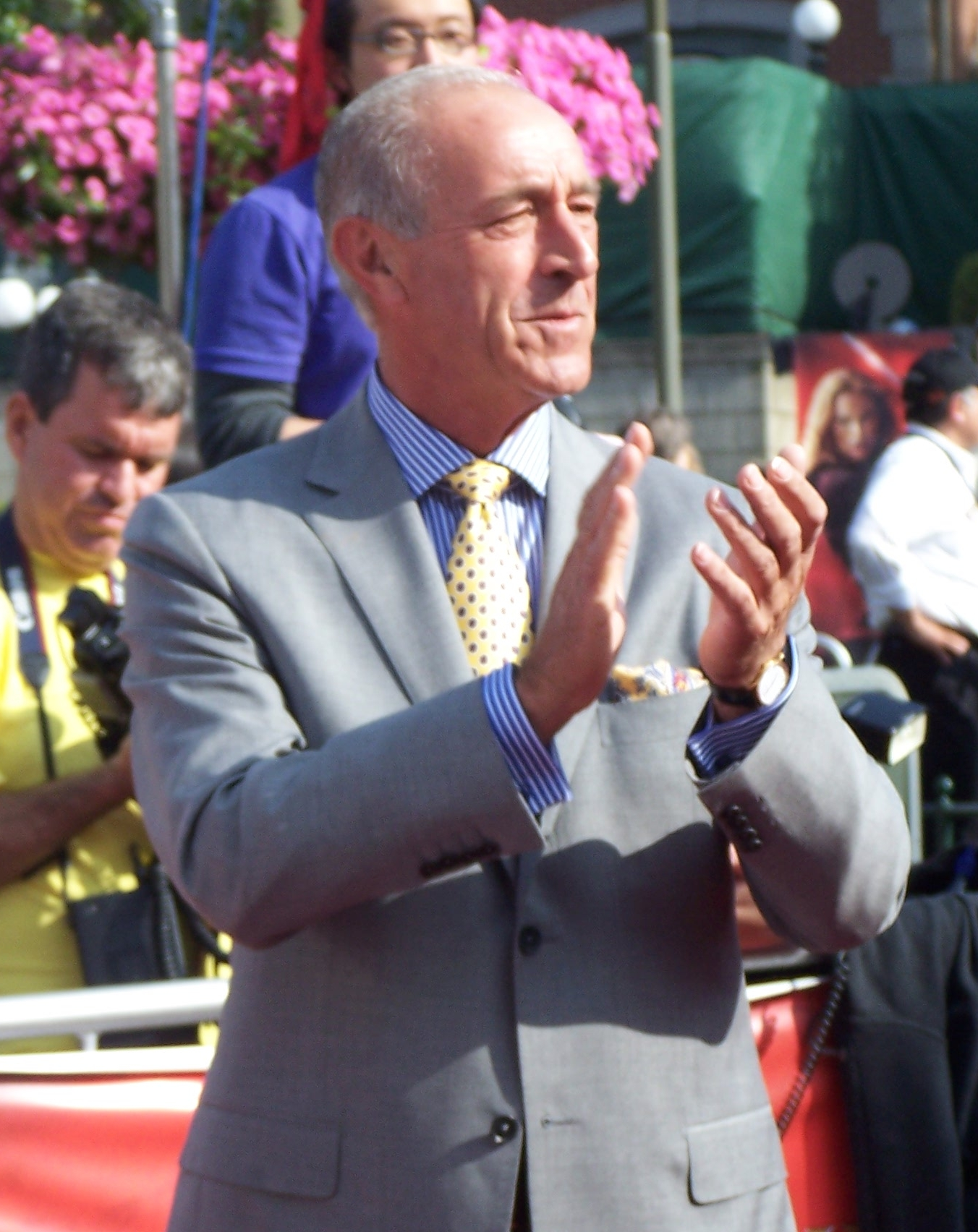
- Goodman in 2007
- Born: Leonard Gordon Goodman; 25 April 1944; Farnborough, Kent, England
- Died: 22 April 2023 (aged 78); Royal Tunbridge Wells, Kent, England
- Occupations: Dancer; dance teacher; dance competition adjudicator
- Years active: 1967–2022
- Notable work: Dancing with the Stars (American TV series) (2005–2022); Strictly Come Dancing (2004–2016); Holiday of My Lifetime (2014–2016); Partners in Rhyme (2017)
- Spouses: Cherry Kingston (m. 1972; div. 1987); Sue Barrett (m. 2012)
- Children: 1

Leonard Gordon Goodman (25 April 1944 – 22 April 2023) was an English professional ballroom dancer, dance teacher, and dance competition adjudicator. He appeared as head judge on the British television programme Strictly Come Dancing – in which various celebrities compete for the glitterball trophy – from its beginning in 2004 until 2016, and on the American television program Dancing with the Stars from 2005 until 2022. After Goodman's death, the award was renamed the Len Goodman Mirrorball trophy. He also ran a ballroom dance school in Dartford, Kent.

== Early life ==
Goodman was born in Farnborough, Kent, on 25 April 1944. He grew up in Bethnal Green, East London, where his grandfather worked as a costermonger, selling fruit and vegetables. As a child, Goodman was wheeled around in his grandfather's barrow and tasked with making sure the vegetables appeared to be fresh. He moved to Blackfen when he was six years old and later attended Westwood Secondary Modern School in his teens, where he was a member of the cricket team.

== Career ==
Goodman was an apprentice welder for Harland and Wolff in Woolwich. He started dancing at the late age of 19, after his doctor recommended it as therapy for a foot injury.

Goodman turned professional, won various competitions, and retired from dancing after winning the British Championships at Blackpool in his late twenties. He was a recipient of the Carl Alan Award, in recognition of outstanding contributions to dance and in 2006 and 2007 a show in which he appeared was nominated for the Emmy Award in the Outstanding Reality/Competition Program category.

=== Strictly Come Dancing ===
Goodman appeared as head judge on the BBC One dance competition Strictly Come Dancing from its inception in 2004 until 2016. He appeared on the panel with Arlene Phillips, Bruno Tonioli, and Craig Revel Horwood; Phillips was later replaced by Alesha Dixon and then Darcey Bussell. In July 2016, Goodman announced he would be leaving the show at the end of that year's series. His final appearance was on the Christmas Day Special. On 9 May 2017, it was announced that Shirley Ballas would succeed Goodman as head judge. Goodman had also appeared on the original Come Dancing series as a judge.

=== Dancing with the Stars ===
Goodman had been the sole head judge on Strictly Come Dancing's American adaptation, Dancing with the Stars. He had appeared with fellow judges Carrie Ann Inaba and Bruno Tonioli since the show's inception and for five seasons with alternating fourth judges and the brother-sister pair of Julianne Hough and Derek Hough. He missed much of season 19 and season 23 due to his responsibilities in the UK, and he did not appear as a judge in season 21 and season 29, but presented short segments on dance styles during the latter season. On 14 November 2022, Goodman announced during the season 31 semifinals broadcast that he would be retiring from the show to spend more time with his family in Great Britain. Goodman died from cancer on 22 April 2023.

After Goodman's death, the Dancing with the Stars Mirrorball Trophy was renamed the Len Goodman Mirrorball Trophy starting in season 32 in his memory. On 24 October 2023, Dancing with the Stars Season 32 paid tribute to the late Goodman, with many of the original dancers returning to perform a group waltz to "Moon River" alongside the show’s current pros. Goodman's wife was present for the performance. The routine was choreographed by pro dancers Val Chmerkovskiy and Jenna Johnson, who received an Emmy nomination for it.

=== Other television work ===
In 2005, Goodman voiced Professor in the five-time Emmy Award–winning children's program Auto-B-Good.

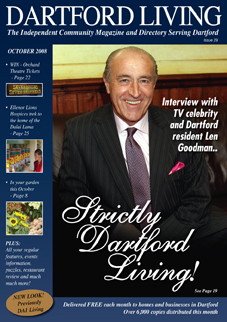
Len Goodman on the cover of Dartford Living, October 2008

In both 2007 and 2008, he was one of the UK's commentators at the Eurovision Dance Contest.

In March and April 2012, Goodman hosted a three-part BBC One documentary that was broadcast in the United States by PBS for the 100th anniversary of the voyage and sinking of the RMS Titanic. It capitalised on his experience as a welder at Harland and Wolff, and in it he interviewed descendants of survivors, and introduced viewers to memorials and significant sites in the United Kingdom.

In 2013, Goodman presented the BBC Four programme Len Goodman's Dance Band Days. He also hosted Len Goodman's Perfect Christmas on Boxing Day on BBC One. In November and December 2013 Goodman and Lucy Worsley presented the BBC Four three-part show Dancing Cheek to Cheek.

In August 2014, Goodman was one of a number of well-known faces taking part in ITV's two-part documentary series Secrets from the Clink. In October 2014, Goodman hosted BBC One show Holiday of My Lifetime. The show returned for a second series in February 2016, in which he was featured with Dan Walker, Carol Kirkwood, and many more.

In November 2015, Goodman and chef Ainsley Harriott presented the BBC show Len and Ainsley's Big Food Adventure, a 10-part series exploring world cuisine in England and Wales. Prior to the show he had never eaten curry, spaghetti or Chinese food.

In 2017, Goodman presented a family game show called Partners in Rhyme, based on Matt Edmondson's game, Obama Llama.

In October 2021, Goodman made a guest appearance in the Channel 4 soap opera Hollyoaks as part of a dancing storyline, when his voice was heard, while dance teacher Trish Minniver, portrayed by Denise Welch, was reminiscing.

=== Radio ===
Between 2013 and 2018, Goodman occasionally deputised for Paul O'Grady on his Sunday afternoon music show on BBC Radio 2, playing the music that he had grown up with. In 2021, he hosted three special bank holiday shows for Boom Radio.

=== Other work ===
In 2006, he appeared on an all singing/dancing version of The Weakest Link and beat Stacey Haynes in the final to win the prize money of £8,050, for his nominated hospice care charity Demelza, of which he was an official patron.

Goodman's autobiography Better Late Than Never, written with Richard Havers, was published by Ebury Press in 2008.

In 2021, Goodman appeared as a contestant in a celebrity version of the ITV quiz show The Chase alongside Nicki Chapman, Will Kirk, and Joe Pasquale.

== Personal life ==
Goodman married his dancing partner Cherry Kingston in 1972, but they divorced in 1987. He then had a long-term relationship with a woman named Lesley, whom he described as the ex-wife of "a bloke called Wilf Pine who had managed the band Black Sabbath". Goodman and Lesley's son, James William Goodman, was born on 26 January 1981, but at the age of 12 moved with his mother back to her native Isle of Wight after his parents had separated. As of 2012, James started Latin and ballroom dancing at his father's Goodman Dance Centre.

On 30 December 2012, Goodman married his companion of more than ten years, Sue Barrett, a 47-year-old dance teacher, in a small ceremony at Mosimann's, a London dining club.

Goodman was a West Ham United fan and was featured on the BBC football show Football Focus on 26 September 2009. He was also a keen cricket fan and in May 2009 took part in a celebrity Ashes cricket match in Van Nuys, California.

In October 2011, Goodman appeared on the BBC's Who Do You Think You Are?, in which he discovered that one of his maternal ancestors was a silk-weaver who died a pauper in the Bethnal Green workhouse. Goodman's great-great-grandfather, Josef/Joseph Sosnowski, came from Poland, where he fought in the anti-tsarist November uprising, for which he was awarded the Virtuti Militari, Poland's highest military decoration for heroism and courage. After finding out about his ancestry, Goodman said: "I feel no different, I look no different, I am no different and yet I'm not what I thought I was. I thought that I was truly an Anglo-Saxon, English through and through."

In March 2009, Goodman was diagnosed with prostate cancer, which was treated surgically at a London hospital. In 2020, he underwent surgery for a small facial melanoma.

Through his son James, Goodman became a grandfather in 2015 when his granddaughter Alice was born; his grandson Jack was born four years later in 2019.

== Death ==
Goodman died from prostate cancer that metastasized to his bones. He died at a hospice in Royal Tunbridge Wells on 22 April 2023, at the age of 78. Fellow Strictly and Dancing With the Stars judge Bruno Tonioli paid tribute to Goodman on social media. Strictly presenter Claudia Winkleman called Goodman "a class act" who was full of "twinkle, warmth and wit".

== Filmography ==
- Strictly Come Dancing (2004–2016)
- Dancing with the Stars (2005–2022)
- Eurovision Dance Contest – UK commentator (2007–2008)
- Titanic with Len Goodman (2012)
- Len Goodman's Dance Band Days (2013)
- Len Goodman's Perfect Christmas (2013)
- Dancing Cheek to Cheek (2013) (with Lucy Worsley)
- Secrets from the Clink (2014)
- Holiday of My Lifetime (2014–2016)
- Perspectives: For The Love of Fred Astaire (2015)
- Len and Ainsley's Big Food Adventure (2015) (with Ainsley Harriott)
- Strictly Len Goodman (2016)
- Len Goodman's Partners in Rhyme (2017)
- Hollyoaks (2021) (voice, one episode)

== Publications ==
- Goodman, Len (with Richard Havers) (2008), Better Late Than Never: from Barrowboy to Ballroom, Ebury Press, ISBN 978-009-1928-03-2
- Smith, Rupert (2005), Strictly Come Dancing; dance consultant: Len Goodman. London: BBC Books ISBN 0-563-52293-3
- Goodman, Len (2014), Dancing Around Britain, Trinity Mirror Media, ISBN 9781908695918
