= After the News (TV programme) =

2017 UK television programme

- Presented by: Emma Barnett, Nick Ferrari
- Country of origin: United Kingdom
- Original language: English
- No. of seasons: 1
- No. of episodes: 19

Production
- Production location: UK
- Camera setup: Multi-camera
- Running time: 35 minutes
- Production companies: ITN for; ITV News & Current Affairs

Original release
- Network: ITV; (except STV)
- Release: 9 October – 3 November 2017

Related
- ITV News at Ten

After the News is a topical discussion programme which was aired on ITV during October and November 2017 in the UK. The live show was broadcast weeknights, and followed ITV News at Ten. The network show had a limited run and was not recommissioned.

Emma Barnett and Nick Ferrari, hosted the 35-minute show on separate nights and they often featured two or more high-profile guests from news, politics, and popular culture, with the focus on debating topical issues and important news stories of the day.

Barnett was also host of her own radio show on BBC Radio 5 Live and occasionally Newsnight before she moved on to host BBC Radio 4's Woman's Hour. Ferrari is the host of his morning show, on LBC radio

After the News, was not shown in most of Scotland as STV had their own late-night current affairs programme, Scotland Tonight which aired at the same time.
