= Emma Barnett =

British broadcaster and journalist (born 1985)

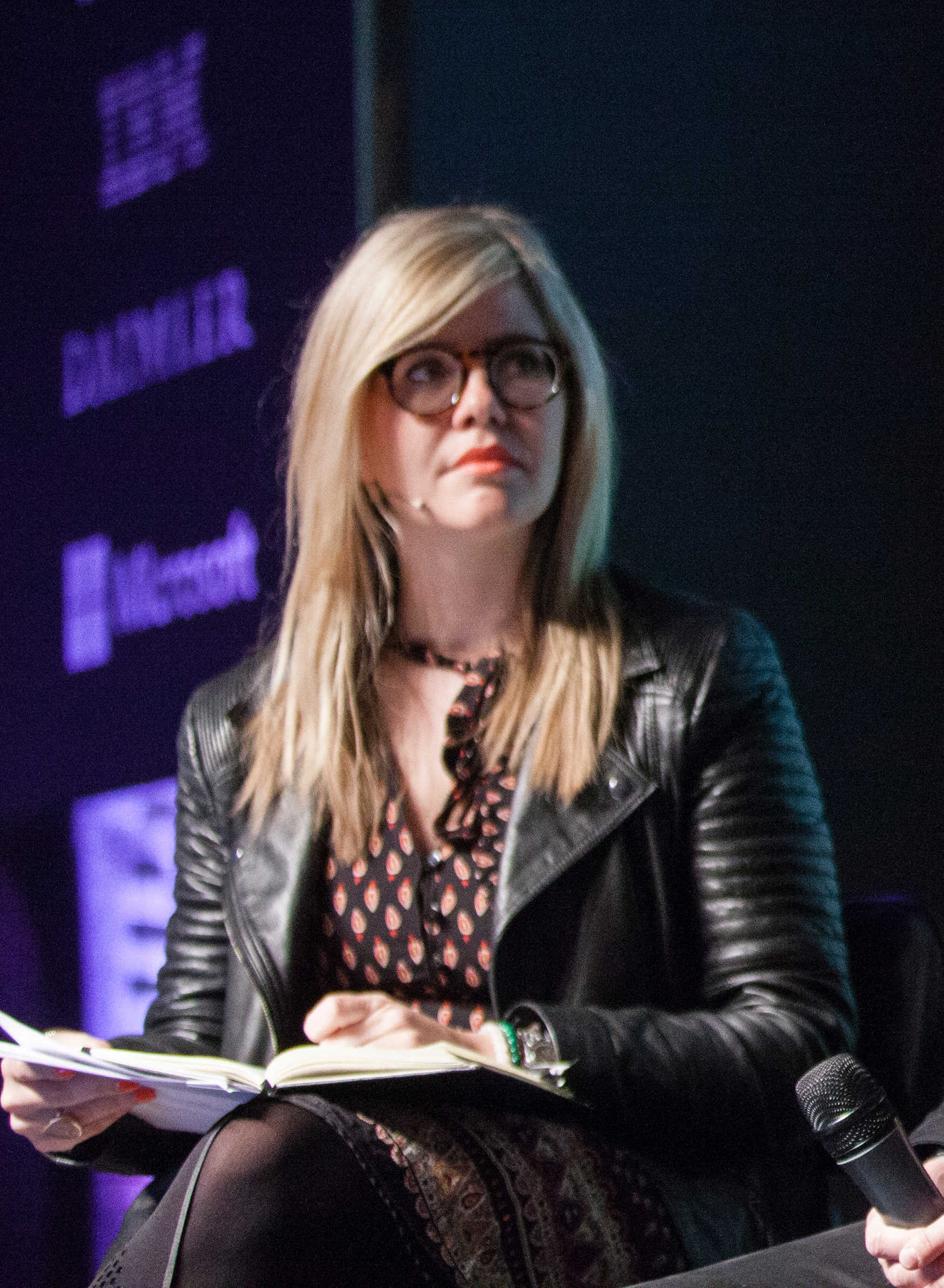
- Barnett in 2016
- Born: 5 February 1985 (age 41); Salford, England
- Education: Manchester High School for Girls; University of Nottingham (BA); Cardiff University (PgDip)
- Occupations: Journalist; TV and radio presenter
- Spouse: Jeremy Weil (m. 2012)
- Children: 2

Emma Barnett (born 5 February 1985) is a British broadcaster and journalist who presented Woman's Hour on BBC Radio 4 from 2021 until March 2024, when she joined the presenting team on BBC Radio 4's flagship news and current affairs programme Today. She left the Today programme in 2026, but remained at the broadcaster to work on a new programme launching in 2027.

Barnett worked for BBC Radio 5 Live for six years, beginning in 2014, after three years working for LBC. Between 2016 and 2020, she presented 5 Live's mid-morning weekday programme. Before beginning her broadcasting career she worked for The Daily Telegraph, first as its Digital Media editor and latterly its Women editor. Between August 2016 and 2020, she was a columnist for The Sunday Times and, from June 2017, a co-presenter of BBC One's Sunday Morning Live. In autumn 2017, she was one of the presenters on the live discussion programme After the News on ITV. Between 2019 and 2022, she was a regular presenter of the BBC's news and current affairs show Newsnight. In March 2024, Barnett announced she would step down from Woman's Hour in April, to join the BBC's Today programme, as part of their presenting team. Barnett stepped down from the programme in November 2026.

== Early life and education ==
Barnett was born on 5 February 1985 at Hope Hospital in Salford to Jewish parents, Ian, a commercial property surveyor, and Michele Barnett and is a single child. Her grandmother fled Wiener Neustadt, Austria, to escape the Nazis.

Barnett was brought up in Broughton Park. She attended Manchester High School for Girls, a private school, where she obtained 3 grade A A' Levels. In 2006 she graduated with a degree in History and Politics from the University of Nottingham. She obtained a Postgraduate Diploma in Journalism from the Cardiff School of Journalism, Media and Cultural Studies in 2007.

In 2010, Barnett's father was sentenced to three years and eight months in prison for operating brothels in the Greater Manchester area, following a prior eight month suspended sentence in 2005, after which he had continued to operate the brothels under other people's names. Her mother received a suspended sentence for money laundering related to income from the brothels. According to police, they "found emails between Mr Barnett and his daughter Emma, talking about his 'whores'". Although Barnett refuses to talk about or answer questions concerning her father's conviction, she has written that the experience traumatised her and that it has been a "long, horribly bumpy road to forgiveness".

== Career ==
Following the postgraduate course at Cardiff, Barnett began her career in journalism at Media Week in 2007 and joined The Daily Telegraph in 2009, later becoming the paper's first digital media editor, and then, from 2012, the women's editor. Barnett launched The Telegraph's digital section, "Wonder Women", in October 2012 with contributors such as Cathy Newman of Channel 4 News. She also became chair of the UJIA Jewish media network and of the UJIA Skirt Network, a networking group for Jewish women.

A radio presenter for LBC for almost three years until early 2014, Barnett joined BBC Radio 5 Live that summer. From November 2014, she presented the station's Hit List programme, a countdown of the 40 highest profile online news stories of the week. After leaving The Telegraph, Barnett started presenting the morning slot on BBC Radio 5 Live in September 2016, being the first woman to have a solo daily slot since the departure of Shelagh Fogarty and Victoria Derbyshire two years earlier in a new-look schedule.

In April 2014, Barnett was a judge for the power list on BBC Radio 4's Woman's Hour, a programme on which she had already been an occasional presenter, the youngest in the programme's history. A decade before Barnett began her role on Woman's Hour, at 17 she did work experience with its presenter, Jenni Murray. Additionally, she has made documentaries for Radio 4.

In August 2016, Barnett's 'Tough Love' agony column began in The Sunday Times Magazine. To encourage her readers to write in about difficult issues, she referred to "the most painful chapter of my life" when her father was "imprisoned for living off immoral earnings" "after pleading guilty to keeping brothels with a turnover of more than £2.5m".

In March 2018, Barnett began a series of podcasts for Historic England entitled Irreplaceable: A History of England in 100 Places. The podcast, presented by Barnett and Dr. Suzannah Lipscomb, was nominated for the British Podcast Awards in the 'Best Branded Content' category in April 2018.

In March 2019, she became one of the regular presenters on BBC Two's Newsnight. In 2019 her book Period. It's About Bloody Time was released, which covered her experience of endometriosis.

In January 2021, Barnett became the main presenter of Woman's Hour on BBC Radio 4. In Barnett's first week, a guest on the programme, Kelechi Okafor, refused to be interviewed by her after overhearing her discuss with the programme producers what Barnett called "allegedly anti-semitic comments" previously made by Okafor. In the following month, one hundred public figures signed an open letter to the BBC criticising what they called Barnett's "strikingly hostile" interview of Zara Mohammed, the Secretary General of the Muslim Council of Britain. In June 2021, Sinéad O'Connor complained about how Barnett had questioned her about her mental health during a Woman's Hour interview. O'Connor announced, because of the interview, she would retire from performing, but two days later retracted her decision to retire.

In January 2022, Barnett started a new role at Bloomberg, hosting the weekly show Emma Barnett Meets. In this role, she has interviewed prominent figures including Al Sharpton, Anthony Fauci and Tim Berners Lee.

In March 2024, Barnett announced she would step down from Woman's Hour in April, to join the presenting team on BBC Radio 4's Today and replacing Martha Kearney, who was leaving the programme after the 2024 General Election. She presented her first edition of Today on 15 May 2024.

In November 2026, Barnett stepped down from the Today programme. She remained at the BBC to work on a new show launching in 2027. Although details have not yet been announced, it is expected to be a longform interview format that will be available on Youtube, BBC iPlayer, and BBC Sounds.

== Awards ==
Barnett was named in two consecutive annual lists of the Radio Academy's 30 under 30 list. She also made the 20 under 30 Hot List feature in Red magazine in 2011. While at The Telegraph, Barnett was named Digital Journalist of the Year by the Association of Online Publishers and Digital Writer of the Year at the 2011 Online Media Awards. She was named best newcomer at the Arqiva commercial radio awards in 2012. She was named Broadcaster of the Year in 2017 by the Political Studies Association and Radio Broadcaster of the Year in 2018 by the Broadcasting Press Guild.

Barnett won the Gold award for Best Speech Presenter at the 2022 Audio and Radio Industry Awards for her work on Woman's Hour.

== Personal life ==
Barnett met her husband, Jeremy Weil, when they were both studying at Nottingham University in 2004. They married at the New West End Synagogue in Bayswater in October 2012. In 2018, they had a son and in 2023, they had a daughter, after five rounds of IVF and experiencing one miscarriage. They have lived in Brixton, south London since 2013. Barnett and Weil are co-creators of a series of colouring books called Colour Your Streets.

Barnett is an Orthodox Jew but, religiously, is not very observant, and is ambivalent between Orthodox and Reform Judaism. In a 2014 BBC Radio segment, she expressed discomfort at women being rabbis. She has volunteered for British Jewish welfare charity Norwood.

Barnett was a member of the Women's Equality Party.

Barnett suffers from endometriosis. In August 2024 she discussed living with pain in a BBC Radio 4 interview with Kirsty Young. In June 2026 Barnett presented a 1 hour documentary on endometriosis, initially transmitted on BBC Two, including giving details of the personal impact that the condition had on her life. On 19 August 2026 she returned to the Today programme saying she had been in hospital for treatment of her endometriosis.
