= Gordon Ramsay on Cocaine =

- Genre: Documentary
- Starring: Gordon Ramsay
- Country of origin: United Kingdom
- Original language: English
- No. of seasons: 1
- No. of episodes: 2

Original release
- Network: ITV
- Release: 19 October – 26 October 2017

Gordon Ramsay on Cocaine is a two-part documentary series starring Gordon Ramsay.

== Overview ==
Gordon Ramsay looks at the problems of cocaine use in the restaurant industry.
