= Steph and Dom's One Star to Five Star =

- Genre: Documentary
- Presented by: Stephanie Parker; Dominic Parker
- Voices of: Louise Ford
- Composer: Paul Farrer
- Country of origin: United Kingdom
- Original language: English
- No. of series: 1
- No. of episodes: 30

Production
- Running time: 30mins
- Production company: Bink Films

Original release
- Network: Channel 4
- Release: 9 October 2017 – present

Steph and Dom's One Star to Five Star is a fly-on-the-wall British television documentary series that has been airing on Channel 4 since 9 October 2017.
