= Island Medics =

- Island Medics title card
- Genre: Fly on the wall documentary
- Directed by: Steven Todd; Iain Robson; Carol Hanlon; Katrina Inkster; Emma Olver; Roshan Samarasinghe; Thomas MacNab
- Narrated by: Kevin Whately
- Country of origin: United Kingdom
- Original language: English
- No. of series: 3

Production
- Executive producers: Helen Munson; Jane Rogerson; Ross Harper
- Cinematography: Iain Robson; Steven Todd
- Editors: Dan Simmonds; Michelle Lord; Chris Travis; Adam Mitchell; Joe Murphy; Cassie Durham
- Production company: Red Sky Productions

Original release
- Network: BBC
- Release: 4 December 2017 – present

Island Medics is a fly-on-the-wall documentary programme based around the day-to-day running of the NHS services in Shetland, Scotland and aired on BBC One. The majority of the filming shows the treatment of patients admitted to the Gilbert Bain Hospital in Lerwick, but it also features other aspects of the medical profession and emergency services that take place in other locations in Shetland, as well as other aspects of island life.

The programme has subsequently been used as a promotional platform by Promote Shetland to encourage those in the medical profession to consider moving to and working in Shetland.

== Sources ==
- Guest, Adam (4 December 2017). "Impressive debut for Island Medics documentary". The Shetland Times.
- "Just what the doctor ordered". HeraldScotland. 12 December 2017.
- "Island Medics. Work in the NHS and emergency services in Shetland | Shetland.org". Promote Shetland.
- "Island Medics to return". Shetland News. 1 November 2018.
