= Holiday of My Lifetime =

- Genre: Documentary
- Presented by: Len Goodman
- Country of origin: United Kingdom
- Original language: English
- No. of series: 2
- No. of episodes: 41

Production
- Running time: 45 minutes
- Production company: Raise the Roof for BBC Scotland

Original release
- Network: BBC One
- Release: 20 October 2014 – 4 March 2016

Holiday of My Lifetime is a documentary series hosted by Len Goodman. It began on 20 October 2014, and concluded on 4 March 2016.

== Format ==
Goodman and a celebrity guest travel to a favourite childhood holiday location of that guest within the United Kingdom. Goodman meets with local historians and residents to get an insight into how the places have changed over the decades.

== Episodes ==
=== Series 1 (2014) ===
No.	Guest	Location(s)	Original release date
1	Dave Myers	Isle of Man	20 October 2014
2	Esther Rantzen	Isle of Wight	21 October 2014
3	Chris Hollins	Oxford	22 October 2014
4	Ainsley Harriott	Blackpool	23 October 2014
5	Fatima Whitbread	Burnham-on-Crouch	24 October 2014
6	Gyles Brandreth	Broadstairs	27 October 2014
7	Arlene Phillips	Southport	28 October 2014
8	Angela Rippon	Mount Edgcumbe Country Park, Cornwall	29 October 2014
9	Anita Manning	Rothesay, Isle of Bute	30 October 2014
10	Eamonn Holmes	Cushendall	31 October 2014
11	Matt Allwright	Teignmouth and Shaldon, Devon	3 November 2014
12	Gloria Hunniford	Newcastle, County Down	4 November 2014
13	Jon Culshaw	Edinburgh and Scottish Highlands	5 November 2014
14	Ann Widdecombe	Lake District	6 November 2014
15	Bill Oddie	Dungeness	7 November 2014

=== Christmas special (2014) ===
No.	Guests	Original release date
16	Ricky Tomlinson, Jennie Bond, Ainsley Harriott & Julia Bradbury	24 December 2014

=== Series 2 (2016) ===
No.	Guest	Location(s)	Original release date
17	Carol Kirkwood	Saint Helier, Jersey	1 February 2016
18	Anton du Beke	Blackpool	2 February 2016
19	Dion Dublin	Great Yarmouth	3 February 2016
20	Lisa Riley	Haworth	4 February 2016
21	Pam St. Clement	Dartmoor	5 February 2016
22	Daniel O'Donnell	Arranmore and Owey Island	8 February 2016
23	Jimi Mistry	Castleton, Derbyshire	9 February 2016
24	Tanni Grey-Thompson	Somerset	10 February 2016
25	Steve Backshall	Dorset	11 February 2016
26	Toyah Willcox	Llangollen Canal, North Wales	12 February 2016
27	Jasper Carrott	South Wales and Barry Island	15 February 2016
28	Lisa Faulkner	West Wittering	16 February 2016
29	Dan Walker	Aberdeen	17 February 2016
30	Edwina Currie	Bournemouth	18 February 2016
31	Valerie Singleton	Ladram Bay	19 February 2016
32	Nigel Planer	Ottery St Mary	22 February 2016
33	Melanie Sykes	Llandudno	23 February 2016
34	Eve Pollard	Margate	24 February 2016
35	Ian Kelsey	Lyme Regis	25 February 2016
36	Janet Ellis	New Forest	26 February 2016
37	Jake Wood	Bude, Cornwall	29 February 2016
38	Lucy Alexander	Herne Bay, Kent	1 March 2016
39	Nicholas Parsons	Studland	2 March 2016
40	Fiona Phillips	Norfolk Broads	3 March 2016
41	Jennie Bond	Pendoggett	4 March 2016
