= We Have Been Watching =

TV comedy review (Gold, 2016–17)

- Directed by: Claire Edwards
- Narrated by: Alison Steadman
- Country of origin: United Kingdom
- Original language: English
- No. of series: 1
- No. of episodes: 6

Production
- Executive producers: Matt Crook; Simon Lupton
- Running time: 60 minutes

Original release
- Network: Gold
- Release: 30 November 2016 – 1 February 2017

We Have Been Watching is an entertainment programme commissioned by Gold first broadcast on 4 January 2017, although a Christmas Special pilot was aired on 30 November 2016. The show is much in the style of Gogglebox but with comedians and comedy actors offering their insights on the nation's best loved comedy scenes.

== Comedians featured ==
- John Challis & Sue Holderness (Only Fools and Horses)
- Sally Phillips & Sarah Hadland (Miranda)
- Ricky Tomlinson & Ralf Little (The Royle Family)
- Russell Tovey and Sarah Solemani (Him & Her)
- Johnny Vegas (Benidorm) & Jo Joyner
- Mathew Baynton & Jim Howick (Horrible Histories)
- Craig Charles & Robert Llewellyn (Red Dwarf)
- Richard Herring & David Baddiel
- Nigel Planer & Adil Ray (Citizen Khan)
- Maxine Peake & Diane Morgan (Funny Cow)
- James Acaster & Nish Kumar
- Josie Lawrence & Meera Syal
- Larry Lamb & Zoe Lyons

== Episodes ==
Episode	Original air date	Comedies discussed
Christmas Special	30 November 2016	The Morecambe & Wise Show, Father Ted, Mr. Bean, Are You Being Served?, The Fast Show, Only Fools and Horses, Miranda, 'Allo 'Allo! and The Royle Family
1	4 January 2017	Harry Enfield and Chums, Steptoe and Son, The Kenny Everett Television Show, The Trip, The Office, The Job Lot, Victoria Wood as Seen on TV, and Fawlty Towers
2	11 January 2017	Absolutely Fabulous, Hancock's Half Hour, Red Dwarf, Some Mothers Do 'Ave 'Em, The Royle Family, Larry Grayson, The IT Crowd, Open All Hours, and Still Open All Hours
3	18 January 2017	Blackadder II, Outnumbered, Only Fools and Horses, Rising Damp, Mind Your Language, The Two Ronnies, Benidorm, and Extras
4	25 January 2017	Porridge, Black Books, At Last the 1948 Show, The Young Ones, Gavin & Stacey, Smack the Pony, One Foot in the Grave, and French and Saunders
5	1 February 2017	Goodness Gracious Me, George and Mildred, Spaced, Till Death Us Do Part, The Day Today, On the Buses, Blackadder Goes Forth, The Good Life, and Bottom
