= Partners in Rhyme =

2017 British television series

- Also known as: Len Goodman's Partners in Rhyme
- Genre: Game show
- Presented by: Len Goodman
- Country of origin: United Kingdom
- Original language: English
- No. of series: 1
- No. of episodes: 12

Production
- Running time: 30 minutes
- Production companies: Panda TV; Accidentally On Purpose

Original release
- Network: BBC One
- Release: 19 August – 23 December 2017

Len Goodman's Partners in Rhyme is a British television series hosted by Len Goodman, which began airing on 19 August 2017 on BBC One. The show was created by Matt Edmondson and was made by Panda TV and AOP for the BBC. The show involves guessing rhymes from animated scenes (by company Creative Nuts) shown to the contestants; the two contestants were paired up with two celebrities and whoever had the most points went through to the final round to win a holiday.

== Reception ==
The show received generally poor reviews from critics. Stuart Heritage writing in The Guardian described it as "a terrible toddler's drawing of a show" and a "fermented kaleidoscope of dung".
