= Paul Hollywood's Big Continental Road Trip =

English television documentary series

- Genre: Documentary
- Starring: Alexis Dubus; Paul Hollywood
- Country of origin: United Kingdom
- Original language: English
- No. of seasons: 1
- No. of episodes: 3

Production
- Running time: 59 min.

Original release
- Release: May 28, 2017

Paul Hollywood's Big Continental Road Trip is a three-part English television documentary series starring Paul Hollywood, an actor, celebrity chef and avid auto enthusiast from Liverpool, exploring the cars, drivers, and automotive profiles of three European countries and how they align with their nation's identities and cultures.

== Cast ==
- Alexis Dubus
- Paul Hollywood
