= The Fifteen Billion Pound Railway =

British TV documentary series

- Genre: Factual
- Narrated by: Julian Barratt
- Country of origin: United Kingdom
- Original language: English
- No. of seasons: 4
- No. of episodes: 9

Production
- Executive producer: Carlo Massarella
- Producer: Lee Reading

Original release
- Network: BBC Two; BBC Two HD
- Release: 16 July 2014 – 19 June 2022

The Fifteen Billion Pound Railway is a British TV documentary series about the construction of a section of the Crossrail railway line which tunnels beneath central London. The first series was produced by Windfall Films and released in the UK in July 2014. It was aired by SBS in Australia, as London's Super Tunnel, commencing in November 2014.

A second series started airing in May 2017, a third series in February 2019, and a fourth and final series, covering the testing and snags in the eventual run-up to public opening, aired in June 2022.

== Episodes ==
Series 1
Title	Original airdate	Episode
Urban Heart Surgery	16 July 2014	1
Tunnels Under The Thames	23 July 2014	2
Platform and Plague Pits	30 July 2014	3

Series 2
Title	Original airdate	Episode
The Final Countdown (Part 1)	22 May 2017	1
The Final Countdown (Part 2)	29 May 2017	2

Series 3
Title	Original airdate	Episode
Under Pressure, Over Budget (Part 1)	13 February 2019	1
Under Pressure, Over Budget (Part 2)	20 February 2019	2

Series 4
Title	Original airdate	Episode
Inside The Elizabeth Line (Part 1)	12 June 2022	1
Inside The Elizabeth Line (Part 2)	19 June 2022	2
