= Toksvig =

Toksvig is a Danish language surname. Notable people with the name include:

- Claus Toksvig (1929–1988), Danish broadcaster and member of the European Parliament for Denmark
- Sandi Toksvig (born 1958), Danish-British writer, performer, and presenter
- Signe Toksvig (1891–1983), Danish author of fiction and non-fiction, including a definitive text on Hans Christian Andersen
