= Mel and Sue =

English comedy duo

Mel & Sue
- Born: Mel Giedroyc; 5 June 1968 (age 58); Epsom, Surrey, England; Sue Perkins; 22 September 1969 (age 56); Dulwich, London, England
- Occupations: Television presenters; comedians
- Years active: 1988–present
- Television: Light Lunch (1997–98); Late Lunch (1998–99); RI:SE (2003); The Great British Bake Off (2010–2016); Mel and Sue (2015); The Generation Game (2018)

Mel Giedroyc (born 5 June 1968) and Sue Perkins (born 22 September 1969), known collectively as Mel and Sue, are an English comedy double act. They are known for hosting the BAFTA Award-winning BBC One cookery series The Great British Bake Off. Previously, they hosted the lunchtime chat shows Light Lunch and Late Lunch on Channel 4.

== Early career ==
Mel and Sue met at a comedy gig in 1988 while both students at the University of Cambridge in England (Giedroyc at Trinity College and Perkins at New Hall) where both were members of the Footlights. They made their debut in 1993 with The Naked Lunch, after which they took their show Kittens Go Grrrrr to the Edinburgh Festival. Giedroyc recalls of their early partnership: "We got on extremely well. We did some very lame gigs performing sketches with two guys, and Sue would compete. But because she was a year younger than me we never knew each other well until after college. We both got very shit degrees, and I failed to get into every drama school, so I gave her a ring and said, 'Do you want to write stuff for Week Ending?'"

== Television ==
=== 1990s ===
The pair's television breakthrough came on the French and Saunders sketch show, where they appeared together in several episodes. Mel and Sue gained widespread popularity in March 1997 when they launched a lunchtime chat show on Channel 4, Light Lunch, where celebrity chefs cooked lunch for the duo's celebrity guests. The show returned for a second series in 1998.

1998-1999 The duo moved to a more prime-time evening slot and the show was renamed Late Lunch.

In 1999, Mel and Sue were signed by ITV and hosted a comedy panel game for the network called Casting Couch, in a prime late evening slot, but it fared poorly in the ratings and was not recommissioned after its initial 6-episode run. ITV created Casting Couch as a vehicle to showcase Mel and Sue's comedic talents as a duo. In each episode, the pair form two teams under the guidance of team captains Chris Moyles and Tamara Beckwith, with regular guest celebrities Marcus Brigstocke and Kevin Day, and two guest celebrities.

=== 2000s ===
Mel and Sue were announced as new co-presenters on Channel 4's RI:SE breakfast TV show in January 2003. They also voiced the Sparky Twins in the CBeebies animated series Little Robots. The pair appeared together again with Dawn French and Jennifer Saunders in a French & Saunders Mamma Mia comedy sketch for Comic Relief in 2009. The double-act was less active in this period, while Mel had children.

=== 2010s ===
Perkins confirmed on Friday Night with Jonathan Ross that the duo would be working together on something new in 2010. Their new show, a baking competition series, The Great British Bake Off, ran for six years on the BBC. It began on BBC Two in August 2010, and after four series it was moved to BBC One for its fifth series in 2014 and a sixth in 2015. On Richard Herring's Leicester Square Theatre Podcast in 2015, Perkins said she had been reluctant to work on Bake Off, but agreed on the condition that the BBC offered Mel the chance to share the presenting role.

In January 2015, Mel and Sue launched a new ITV daytime chat show called Mel & Sue, the show features appearances from celebrity guests, audience interaction and cookery, this time with members of the public being nominated to appear as the guest chef.

In September 2016, when it was announced that The Great British Bake Off would be moving to Channel 4 in 2017, Mel and Sue said that they would not be a part of the channel move and be stepping down as hosts of the show after the 7th edition.

In October 2016, it was confirmed that Mel and Sue would become the presenters of Let's Sing and Dance for Comic Relief for BBC One in March 2017. On 23 July 2017, it was confirmed that Mel and Sue would host a new version of The Generation Game for BBC One.

=== 2020s ===
In 2020, Mel and Sue costarred as contract killers in the Sky/Peacock comedy series Hitmen. The show currently has aired 2 seasons. It has not yet been renewed for a third.

== Radio ==
Mel and Sue's paired radio credits began with appearances by Mel on Sue's BBC Radio 4 comedy panel show series The 99p Challenge in 2000, then in 2002 they made a show for BBC Radio 2 titled Mel And Sue's Comedy Breakdown, a six-part series exploring the best of comedy, and BBC Radio 4's, The Mel and Sue Thing, a six-part series that also aired in 2002 and was later released on BBC CD.

== Podcast ==
In 2025 they launched a podcast Mel and Sue Should Know by Now on Audible.

== Live shows ==
Their first show at Edinburgh Fringe was in 1993 and it was called Naked Brunch according to the Telegraph and Naked Lunch according to the Independent. In 1994 Mel and Sue performed a show at Edinburgh called Kittens Go Grrrrr and in 1996 their show was called Planet Pussycat. Their style was noted by The Independent as character comedy. As well as performing live as a duo in their early stand-up days, Mel and Sue embarked on a UK national tour from 1995 - 1996. When they appeared on Room 101 together, one of their choices was one of their dates from this tour - in Leighton Buzzard. They chose this because they had such a bad audience there. Once their television career was in full swing, in April and May 1999 they toured the country again with their show, Mel & Sue: Back to Our Roots which was "a hilarious stage show that captures the submersive brilliance of their smash-hit TV show" according to the show's promotional material. One reviewer remarked: "Mel and Sue on stage is virtually the same as the TV incarnation, except they don't have any guests."
