= Richard Hammond's 5 O'Clock Show =

British television programme

- Genre: Talk show
- Presented by: Richard Hammond
- Starring: Mel Giedroyc
- Country of origin: United Kingdom
- Original language: English
- No. of series: 1
- No. of episodes: 30

Production
- Running time: 60 minutes (inc. adverts)
- Production company: So Television

Original release
- Network: ITV
- Release: 3 January – 10 February 2006

Richard Hammond's 5 O'Clock Show was a British talk show shown every weekday on the British channel ITV from 3 January until 10 February 2006. The show was presented by Richard Hammond and Mel Giedroyc, and featured a variety of reports on popular and unusual topics. They talked about things that matter to the public, and tested claims like "an unstainable suit" or "unbreakable crockery". The show was first aired in 2006 replacing The Paul O'Grady Show, which had moved to Channel 4.

== Regular slots ==
- Mothers of Invention - Mother inventors compete to win help from a business guru who will help them to make their invention a success.
- Journey to the Centre of Britain - Richard attempts to find the exact location of the centre of Britain.
- You're Having a Laugh - Stand-up comedy from everyday people who think they are funny. Each person has 1 minute on stage to try out their comedy.
- Gone to a Good Home - To solve the problem of unwanted Christmas gifts the idea of this slot is to leave an unwanted gift on your doorstep so that someone else may take it away.
- Martin's Money Tips - Martin Lewis gives tips to the public on how to save money.
- Expert complainer Jasper Griegson gives tips to the audience on how to complain to get what they want from companies.
- The show also regularly interviewed the contestants and judges of Dancing on Ice.
- The flatpack challenge with Darius, ferret racing with Sara Cox, operatic football chants with Russell Watson and a performance by the "Billy Elliot" of cheerleading.

== Regular competitions ==
- The first competition featured a phone in question worth £1000, then the winner would have to identify an extreme close up of a photo for an additional maximum of £2000.
- It was then changed to only a phone in general knowledge question worth £2000.
- Another competition was made in which the public could bid for the prize and the bid which was so low and solo won. This meant that the lowest unique bid was the winner.
