= Light Lunch =

British TV lunch-time comedy chatshow

- Also known as: Late Lunch
- Genre: Talk show
- Presented by: Mel Giedroyc; Sue Perkins
- Country of origin: United Kingdom
- Original language: English
- No. of series: 4
- No. of episodes: 186

Production
- Running time: 60 minutes
- Production company: Princess Productions

Original release
- Network: Channel 4
- Release: 24 March 1997 – 5 March 1999

Light Lunch (later Late Lunch) was a Channel 4 lunch-time comedy chatshow broadcast on weekdays at 12:30 pm between 24 March 1997 and 27 February 1998, which was moved to weeknights at 6:00 pm between 31 March 1998 and 5 March 1999. It was hosted by Mel Giedroyc and Sue Perkins, also known as Mel and Sue, who started their comedy careers at Cambridge University's Footlights club. The show was a huge success initially, but audience figures declined slowly.

== Format ==
The show was structured around the making and eating of a luncheon. The main part of the meal would be prepared by a guest chef, with either Giedroyc or Perkins talking to the chef during the demonstration. Once the meal was ready, it was eaten by Giedroyc, Perkins and two celebrity guests, during which an interview would take place. In the final part of the programme, a third celebrity guest brought in dessert, and a further period of interviewing would occur on the sofa, which would include phone-in questions from viewers. The studio audience were also expected to bring in their own lunch to eat during the show, and were each given £3 to cover the cost of this. They were encouraged to bring in unusual food, their own creations, or food in some way relating to that day's celebrity guest, and the most creative ideas would be shown on camera.

== Late Lunch ==
As a result of declining viewing figures and because of a general change in viewer demographics in the UK, Light Lunch was moved to a 6:00 pm time slot in March 1998 and rebranded as Late Lunch. It ran in that slot for nearly a year before being cancelled in 1999. Between 1998 and 1999, Late Lunch was repeated on a weekend as part of Channel 4's T4 strand.

== Band ==
The show's house band (introduced individually as "Steve, Matt, Dylan and Dan" and collectively by numerous different names, mostly food puns) included Dylan Howe on drums.

== Broadcast ==
Series	Series title	Episodes	Originally released	
Series	Series title	Episodes	First released	Last released
1	Light Lunch	59	24 March 1997	13 June 1997
2	Light Lunch	91	6 October 1997	27 February 1998
3	Late Lunch	18	31 March 1998	7 May 1998
4	Late Lunch	18	21 October 1998	5 March 1999
