= Draw It! =

- Genre: Drawing Game show
- Directed by: Julian Smith
- Presented by: Mel Giedroyc
- Composer: Nick Foster
- Country of origin: United Kingdom
- Original language: English
- No. of series: 1
- No. of episodes: 40

Production
- Executive producers: Victoria Ashbourne; Tamara Gilder; Stuart Shawcross
- Camera setup: Multiple-camera setup
- Running time: 30 minutes (inc. adverts)
- Production company: Victory Television

Original release
- Network: Channel 4
- Release: 5 May – 4 July 2014

Related
- Win, Lose or Draw

Draw It! is a drawing game show that aired on Channel 4 from 5 May to 4 July 2014, hosted by Mel Giedroyc. It is loosely based on the popular mobile app, Draw Something.

== Format ==
Each week, two well-known celebrities pair up with a different daily contestant in the studio in order to help them win a cash prize. The two contestants who have the highest scores across the week and top the leaderboard come back to play on 'Big Money Friday' where contestants have the chance to walk away with up to £50,000. The aim is to guess the exact word that is being drawn. Contestants can activate the word jumble, to show them an anagram of the word, by pressing a buzzer, but this halves the money they get if they give a correct answer. On 'Big Money Friday' correct answers in the first 3 rounds are worth double.

Round	Format
Contestant Quick Draw	The contestant from each team has to do three drawings for the celebrity to guess. There is an easy one worth £100, a medium one worth £200 and a hard one worth £300. The contestant has 30 seconds to do each drawing and the word jumble can be activated by the celebrity at any point, halving the money available for that drawing.
Quick on the Draw	Six drawings submitted by users of the show's app are recreated by animation over 30 seconds. Either team is able to buzz in to stop the clock and give an answer. If the answer is correct they get £200, if not the team are frozen out for the rest of the drawing so only the other team can buzz in. The word jumble is activated with 10 seconds remaining, so from this point onwards a correct answer will only get £100.
Celebrity Quick Draw	The celebrity from each team has 90 seconds to do as many drawings as possible for the contestant to guess, each worth £300. The word jumble may be activated once the buzzer has lit up, which occurs 15 seconds into each drawing.The team with the most money at the end of this round go through to the final, while the other team leave with nothing. The top 2 teams for the week go through to compete in 'Big Money Friday'.
Final	The contestant of the winning team decides whether to draw or guess. The drawer then draws 3 drawings; one easy, one medium and one hard; over 60 seconds with the clock being stopped between each drawing. If the guesser gets all 3 correct then the contestant wins all of the money earned by their team over the show. One word jumble is available across the 3 drawings and may be activated by the contestant shouting 'jumble', but if this is not used then the contestant wins double the money earned over the show (10 times the money earned on 'Big Money Friday').

== Celebrities ==
Week	Air dates	Celebrities
1	5–9 May 2014	Nadia Sawalha; Anton du Beke
2	12–16 May 2014	Terry Wogan; Phil Tufnell
3	19–23 May 2014	Louie Spence; Jenny Eclair
4	26–30 May 2014	Rosemary Shrager; Tim Vine
5	2–6 June 2014	Christopher Biggins; Stacey Solomon
6	9–13 June 2014	Myleene Klass; Brian Conley
7	23–27 June 2014	Melanie Sykes; John Thomson
8	30 June–4 July 2014	Antony Cotton; Denise van Outen

== Notable contestants ==
- Nick Smith won £41,000 on 23 May 2014, partnered with Louie Spence.
