= The Big Spell (TV series) =

- Genre: Game show
- Presented by: Sue Perkins; Joe Lycett
- Starring: Moira Stuart
- Country of origin: United Kingdom
- Original language: English
- No. of series: 1
- No. of episodes: 8

Production
- Running time: 60 minutes (inc. adverts)
- Production company: Remarkable Entertainment

Original release
- Network: Sky 1
- Release: 8 January – 26 February 2017

The Big Spell is a British game show which aired in January and February 2017 on Sky 1. The program is an adaptation of the Australian program The Great Australian Spelling Bee. It features 20 children aged between 9 and 13 competing in a series of spelling-related challenges, and delves into both the spellings and the meanings of various words. The show is hosted by Sue Perkins and Joe Lycett, with newsreader Moira Stuart the pronouncer. Perkins stated that she only was interested in presenting the show if it was "nice" and avoided cynicism. The show was cancelled after one series, with only 160,000 viewers watching the finale.

== Background ==
The program was first announced in April 2016 under the title Spelling Star, based on the Australian format The Great Australian Spelling Bee which ran for two seasons between 2015 and 2016. The series was acquired by Sky 1 at the MIPTV Media Market event in 2016, and eight episodes will be produced by Remarkable Television, a subsidiary of Endemol Shine Group, who co-developed the original Australian format.

== Games ==
The first game is Speed Spell, similar to the Great Australian Spelling Bee. There are five groups of four, named after colours, and the objective is to spell as many words as possible in one minute. If one of the spellers in a team spells the word wrong, they are forced to step back out of the lit hexagon and the rest of the team members continue. There are two ways that the game can be stopped, one is when the one minute has passed, and the other is if all members of the team spell incorrect words before the 60 seconds has passed. The four teams that score the highest were automatically safe for the next episode while the team with the lowest score is forced to go in the Elimination round to fight to be safe. The teams stand in a lit hexagon when spelling, and the hexagon also acts as a visual guide as to how much time the team has left in their 60 seconds.

The second game is called Spell Check. There are six groups of three, and each group has one player standing behind a buzzer. On the big screen, six words will come up, one of which is misspelt; the aim of the game is to spot which one is misspelt, identify it, and spell it correctly. The four teams that have all three members answer correctly the quickest go through, while the remaining teams fight to survive elimination.

The third challenge is called Show and Spell. In this challenge, spellers have to correctly identify a word from a series of clues. The competitors are split into teams as chosen by a random pick beforehand. Each team lines up in groups behind a set of podiums. A member of each must step up to the buzzer. The pronouncer will read a series of clues to a word. The aim of the game is to work out the word, buzz in to identify it then spell it correctly. Here there are four teams of four and the team that cannot get all four spellers through before the other three teams will go to the elimination round.

The fourth challenge is called Word Duel. In this challenge, two spellers will step up to spell against each other at the same time using a giant touchpad. The pronouncer will say a word and both spellers will spell the word to the best that they can, before pressing enter to confirm their word entry. If both of the spellers have got the word correct, the pronouncer will say another word, and if one of them gets it right and the other gets it wrong then the person who got it wrong will have to go to the elimination round. If they both get the words right three times, then it will go to a timed round, whoever can spell the word correctly and quickest.

The fifth challenge is called Speed Spell Trio, and it is exactly the same as normal Speed Spell, with the same rules, just with teams of three. Here there are four teams of three and two of these teams go to the elimination.

The sixth challenge is another Show and Spell, this time with five pairs of two, with the same rules except that the first two teams to get three points go through, while two pairs go into the elimination.

The seventh challenge is Spell Check, the semi-final round, with four pairs of two trying to outspell the others, and with only two teams going through safe.

The final challenge is the Ultimate Spelling Bee, with the same rules as a normal spelling bee, but this time, to decide who is the champion of The Big Spell.

== Elimination games ==
The first elimination challenge is called Spelling Bee. In this round, two people get knocked out and the aim of the game was to keep spelling correctly to stay in the game. If one person got a word incorrect and the others got it right, then that person will go out of the competition and similarly if two people get it wrong, both will go out of the competition. But when three or more people get it wrong, things start to get interesting, as then the people who got their words correct are automatically through to the next round, while the people who got it wrong have to spell out the others amongst themselves to decide who is going through.

The second elimination challenge is called Letter By Letter, and in this challenge, spellers will be asked to spell out a word, letter by letter, one at a time. The words will keep coming until one of the spellers makes a mistake. The last speller standing earns their safety and will return to spell in the next episode. This continues until two Spellers are eliminated from the competition.

The third elimination challenge is called Individual Speed Spell and this is just like the normal team speed spell with the same rules just that if a speller makes a mistake, the round ends irrespective of the time left in the round.

The fourth elimination challenge is similar to the first one—the spelling bee. It is exactly the same rules, but with seven spellers.

The fifth episode is Letter by Letter, and it is exactly the same as the second challenge.

The sixth elimination is Individual Speed Spell, and the rules are the same as the third round.

The seventh elimination was the Spelling Bee, with four people, with the same rules as the first elimination.

== Episode One ==
The first episode of The Big Spell aired at 5 pm on Sky One on Sunday 8 January. It started by showing a preview of rounds to come as well as Sue Perkins talking about how the 20 spellers were chosen. The first round, featuring all 20 contestants was Speed Spell, where the 20 contestants were split up into 5 groups of 4, each named after colours. Each team had 60 seconds to answer as many words correctly as possible.

Team	Blue	Yellow	Red	Green	Orange
Score	6	10	11 (Top Speller)	9	8

Blue	Yellow	Green	Orange	Red
Anna	Ayushman	Alex	Caleb	Odhran
Evie	Sanskriti	Kate	Scarlett	Jade
Dan	Tiarna	Nathan	Zara	Jasmine
Henry	Jeswin	Dexter	Tam	Saik

The Blue team, who scored the lowest, would have to face off against each other in the elimination round to fight to stay in the competition, while the other teams went through, with the Red team being Top Spellers. The elimination was a traditional Spelling Bee, where Henry and Evie went out.

== Episode Two ==
The second episode of The Big Spell was aired at the later time of 5:30 pm on Sky One on 15 January. The episode began by showing a recap of the previous episode before a trailer of that week's episode. The team game for that episode was Spell Check, where the aim of the game is to identify the incorrectly spelt word from 6 on a big screen, buzz in and say which is misspelt, before spelling the word correctly. There were 6 groups of 3, and only 4 went through safe to the next round.

Team	Blue	Yellow	Red	Green	Orange	Purple
Position	5th	4th	3rd	2nd	1st (Top Speller)	6th

Team	Blue	Yellow	Red	Green	Orange	Purple
Spellers	Anna, Nathan, Jasmine	Zara, Jade, Scarlett	Tam, Kate, Caleb	Alex, Jeswin, Dan	Dexter, Ayushman, Saik	Tiarna, Odhran, Sanskriti.

The elimination round was Letter By Letter, where Moira says a word and each person says a letter of that word. If spelt wrong, that person has to step back and the last person standing is safe through to the next round. Out of the six in the elimination round, only 4 progressed, and Tiarna and Anna were the two to be knocked out of the competition.

== Episode Three ==
The third episode of The Big Spell aired at 5:30 pm on Sky One on 22 January. Only 16 spellers remained in the competition and the episode started with the now synonymous recap of the previous episode and trailer of the next. The team round for this episode was Show and Spell, and as all the words were nature themed, the set was transformed to look like a jungle, and even had an orangutan called Otto. The game was basically an extended crossword, with clues being given and the aim being to identify the word, say the word and then spell it. There were 4 teams of 4 and to be safe, one had to get all team members through to the next round. Again the teams were named after colours. Usually, the team picking is done beforehand but in this episode, it was done on camera, where the spellers had to pick up bamboo sticks with a colour on the bottom. Out of the 4 teams only 3 of them got safe through to the next round meaning that out of the four spellers in the elimination, only two go through.

Team	Purple	Yellow	Red	Green
Position	2nd	4th	1st (Top Speller)	3rd

Team	Purple	Yellow	Red	Green
Spellers	Tam, Jade, Sanskriti, Nathan	Kate, Jasmine, Zara, Alex	Scarlett, Caleb, Ayushman, Odhran	Jeswin, Dan, Dexter, Saik

The Red Team progressed first, followed swiftly afterwards by the Purple team, before a shootout between Yellow and Green, whoever could answer the question goes through. The green team did get the question correctly, meaning the Yellow Team went into the elimination, the Individual Speed Spell, rules explained in the Elimination Games section, where Kate and Zara left the competition.

== Episode Four ==
The fourth episode started airing on Sunday 29 January at 5:30 pm. The round was Word Duel. This was the first time the spellers had to face each other. There were two large computers and the spellers had to spell a word at the same time onto the touchpad. If they both spell the word correctly, they will spell again. If they both get it wrong, they spell again. If one speller is correct and the other one isn't, that player will win the head-to-head and will progress through to the next stage.

Player 1	Player 2
Jeswin (W)	Scarlett
Nathan	Odhran (W)
Dan	Ayushman (W)
Saik (W)	Tam
Caleb (W)	Dexter
Jade (W)	Jasmine
Sanskriti	Alex (W)

Scarlett, Nathan, Dan, Tam, Dexter, Jasmine and Sanskriti had to go to the elimination. Similarly to Episode One, there was a traditional spelling bee, with Dan and Nathan going home.

== Episode Five ==
The fifth episode of the Big Spell aired at 5:30 pm on Sunday 5 February 2017, where 12 contestants battled it out to see who would get into the quarterfinals, and the team round for this episode was Speed Spell. This marks the start of the second half of the competition where some of the rounds are repeated. The Speed Spell had a twist, it was in 4 groups of 3, although the rules were the same. The elimination was Letter by Letter.

Team	Yellow	Red	Orange	Green
Score	13 (Top Speller)	11	9	10

Team	Yellow	Red	Orange	Green
Spellers	Jasmine, Odhran, Dexter	Caleb, Ayushman, Scarlett	Jeswin, Jade, Saik	Tam, Sanskriti, Alex

The orange and the green team were the two lowest scoring teams. Consequently, they had to face the elimination challenge, Letter by Letter, where Saik and Tam went out.

== Quarter-finals (Episode Six) ==
Episode Six of The Big Spell aired on 12 February 2017 at 5:30 pm. This episode was the quarter-final episode, and only 10 spellers remained. The team round was Show and Spell and was based on a Space theme. The teams were picked on stage inside a massive crater, and there were five pairs. Of these five pairs, three went through, leaving four to fight it out in the Speed Spell elimination round.

Team	Blue	Red	Green	Yellow	Orange
Position	3rd	2nd	1st	4th	5th

Team	Blue	Red	Green	Yellow	Orange
Spellers	Ayushman, Jasmine	Scarlett, Jeswin	Caleb, Jade	Dexter, Sanskriti	Alex, Odhran

The Green team went through in first place, followed shortly afterwards by the Red Team, and after a thrilling showdown, the blue team advanced as well, leaving Sanskriti, Dexter, Alex and Odhran to fight it out in the second challenge. Sanskriti was eliminated along with Dexter. Alex set the Speed Spell record with 14.

== Semi-finals (Episode Seven) ==
The Semi-finals of The Big Spell aired on 19 February at 5:30 pm on Sky One. It was the seventh episode of the new series, and in this episode, the remaining eight spellers fought it out to get to the Final of The Big Spell. The first challenge was Spell Check, where 4 pairs went head to head, and the first two pairs with 4 points each would be guaranteed a place in the final while, for the other two pairs, a trip to the Spelling Bee elimination was due, where only two could get through, and the other two would go home.

Team	Red	Green	Yellow	Orange
Spellers	Jasmine, Jeswin	Odhran, Ayushman	Alex, Scarlett	Jade, Caleb

The Green team progressed first, followed by the Yellow team, and after an absolute thriller of a Spelling Bee, Jeswin and Jade progressed through to the final, leaving Caleb and Jasmine out of the competition.

== The Final (Episode Eight) ==
The Grand Final of Series One of The Big Spell aired on 26 February 2017 at 5:30 pm on Sky One, and promised to be a cracking showdown to find the winner of Series One of The Big Spell. The first challenge was Speed Spell Individual (see the third elimination for the rules) but the rules slightly change. The contestants who didn't finish last go through to the next round. The results were:

Spellers	Alex	Scarlett	Jade	Jeswin	Odhran	Ayushman
Score	13	11	10	7	9	2

Ayushman went out of the competition, leaving 5 spellers left in the competition. The second challenge was Letter by Letter (rules explained in the second elimination), where Jade went through first. Jeswin and Alex quickly followed, leaving a shootout between Scarlett and Odhran. Scarlett managed to come out on top, meaning Odhran was out of the competition.

The third and final challenge was called The Ultimate Spelling Bee (rules for the spelling bee are in the seventh elimination). This was the round that decides who wins The Big Spell. Scarlett went out first, followed swiftly by Jade. This meant that Jeswin and Alex were the last two remaining. After a long time of continuous spelling, Jeswin finally spelt his word wrong, leaving Alex to spell his word correctly to win The Big Spell. Alex did spell his word correctly, making him the winner of the inaugural Big Spell. The winning word was syllogism.
