= Silver Lining (play) =

Play by Sandi Toksvig

Silver Lining is a play by British-Danish playwright and comedian Sandi Toksvig. The show opened at the Rose Theatre Kingston, on 3 February 2017 and is touring the UK in 2017.

== Plot ==
The play is a comedy starring five elderly residents in a Gravesend retirement home under threat of flood.
