= Francis Hackett =

Irish writer

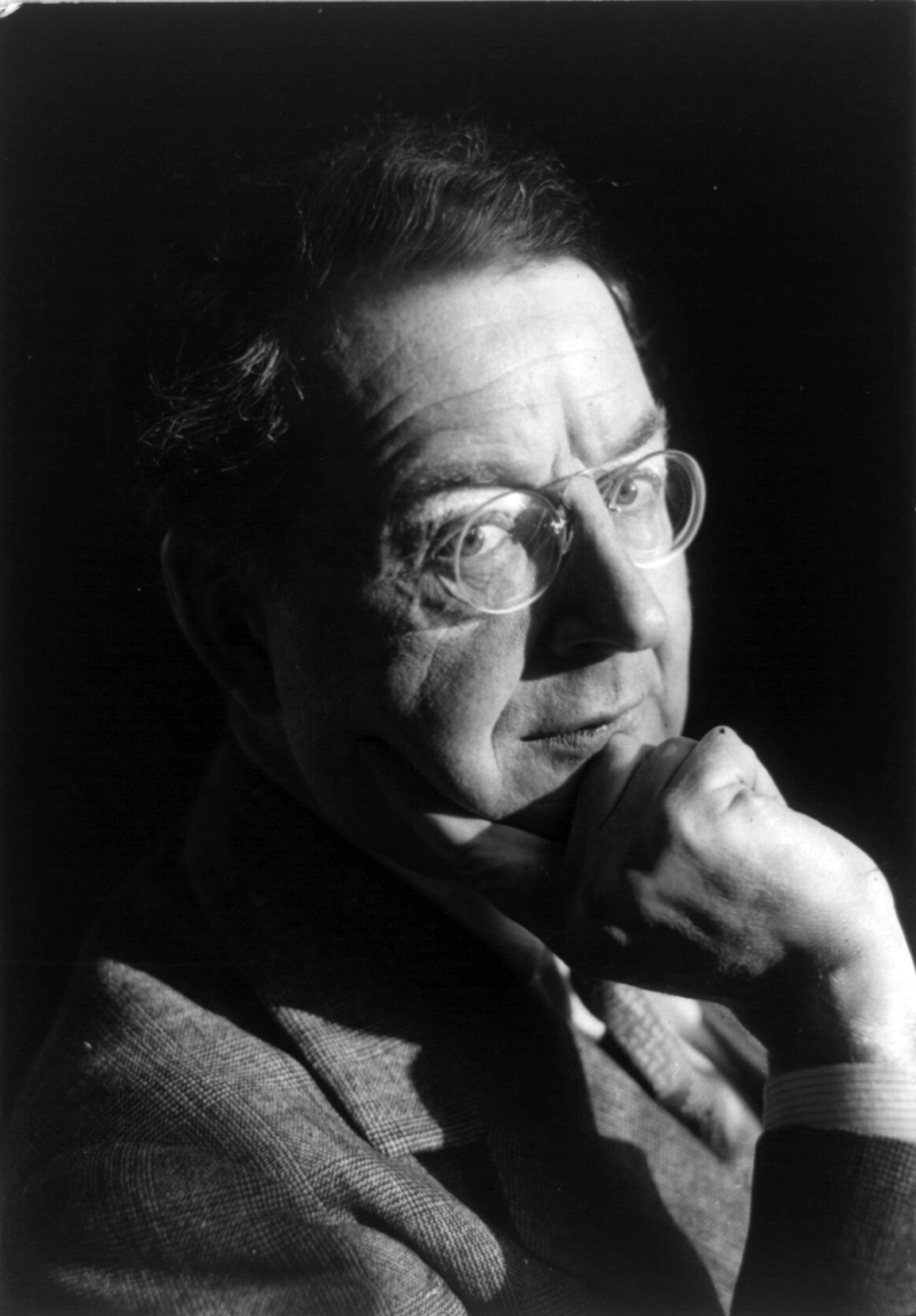
- Born: January 21, 1883; Kilkenny, Ireland
- Died: April 25, 1962 (aged 79); Virum, Denmark
- Occupation: Writer (novelist)
- Spouse: Signe Toksvig (m. 1918)
- Writing career
- Period: 20th century
- Genre: fiction

Francis Hackett (21 January 1883 – 25 April 1962) was an Irish novelist and literary critic. He is most famous for writing a detailed book about Henry VIII but was also a noted critic and published several other books most of which were either non-fiction or biographies.

== Biography ==
Hackett was born in Kilkenny, Ireland to the daughter of a farmer and a medical officer. He was educated in St Kieran's College, where Thomas MacDonagh was his teacher. He married the Danish writer Signe Toksvig in 1918. The couple lived in Ireland in the early years of the State, and then moved to Denmark, to the US during World War II, and back to Denmark.

He emigrated to the United States in 1901 for various reasons, among them being his dissatisfaction with the British Government ruling Ireland, and his family's inability to finance his college education. When he arrived in New York he published articles in Standish O’Grady's All Ireland Review, Arthur Griffith's United Irishman, and Samuel Richardson's The Gael. Hackett took a series of jobs as a clerk in a law firm, for the advertising department of Cosmopolitan Magazine, and literary editor of various periodicals, such as the Chicago Evening Post. In 1906 Hackett moved into Hull House and taught English to Russian Immigrants. As writer and critic, Hackett attacked Chicago's genteel and commercial cultures, racism, and the subordination of women. He left his position as literary editor of the Post in 1911 to pursue a career as a novelist.

In 1946, King Christian X of Denmark awarded Hackett the Liberty Medal.

Hackett died on 25 April 1962.

== Works ==
- As an alien feels, (1915)
- Ireland: A Study In Nationalism, (1918)
- Horizons: A Book Of Criticism, (1918)
- The Invisible Censor, (1918)
- The Irish Republic, (1920)
- On American Books [edited], (1920)
- The Story Of The Irish Nation, (1922)
- That Nice Young Couple, (1925)
- Henry The Eighth, (1929)
- Francis, The First, (1934)
- The Green Lion, (1936)
- Queen Anne Boleyn, (1939)
- I Chose Denmark, (1940)
- What 'Mein Kampf' Means To America, (1941)
- The Senator's Last Night, (1943)
- On Judging Books In General And In Particular, (1947)

=== Posthumous ===
- — (1970). American Rainbow: Early Reminiscences. New York: Liveright.
