= Pitch Battle =

Television series

- Genre: Music
- Presented by: Mel Giedroyc
- Judges: Gareth Malone; Kelis; Will Young (guest); Chaka Khan (guest); Bebe Rexha (guest); Seal (guest); Joe Jonas (guest); Nick Jonas (guest); Deke Sharon (guest)
- Composers: Jack Blume; Joanne Evans
- Country of origin: United Kingdom
- Original language: English
- No. of series: 1
- No. of episodes: 6

Production
- Production location: Dock10
- Running time: 90 minutes
- Production company: Tuesday's Child

Original release
- Network: BBC One
- Release: 17 June – 22 July 2017

Pitch Battle is a British singing show hosted by Mel Giedroyc on BBC One, which aired for one series in 2017. The show sees rival musical groups facing-off against each other, inspired by the 2012 film Pitch Perfect. At the final on 22 July 2017, Leeds Contemporary Singers were crowned the winners.

== Judges and presenters ==
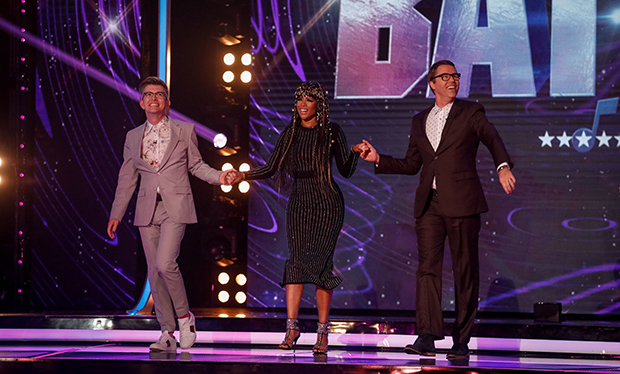
Finale Judges: Gareth Malone, Kelis, Deke Sharon

The series was hosted by Mel Giedroyc and is joined each week by judges Gareth Malone and Kelis and series music director Deke Sharon. Guest judges for the series are Will Young (first episode), Chaka Khan (second), Bebe Rexha (third). Seal (fourth) and Joe Jonas (fifth). All performed in the live finale, with Deke Sharon filling the third judging seat.

Jermaine Jackson joined as a sixth special guest for the live finale (paired with the wild card group). Due to work commitments Joe was not able to attend the live final so his brother Nick Jonas attended and performed in his place.

== Format ==
Each episode of the show features a variety of groups, one of which is a cappella, and the others, ranging in style (community choir, show choir, gospel group, etc.) perform with the show's live band. After an opening number featuring the 6 new groups, the groups are paired off, each performing their "showstopper", followed by a back-and-forth Pitch Perfect-inspired riff off on a specific theme, after which one of the two groups is eliminated. The remaining three groups then perform a song featuring a soloist, after which the judges eliminate one more group, then the final two sing a song by the guest judge, back and forth, during which the guest judge grabs a mic and starts singing joining the winning group.

The live finale has a couple of additional features: All five winning groups will perform with the judge that chose them (with the wild card group paired with a sixth celebrity). In addition, instead of a solo round, the top 3 groups will all sing a song a cappella.

== Battles ==
The battles consist of three rounds; in the first round 2 choirs battle each other with a song of choice then again in the 'Riff-off' where a theme is selected at random and both choirs sing songs based around that theme, the judges will then select which choir they would like to advance to the solo battle. For the solo battle each choir will select one member to perform 1 song solo, once all 3 choirs have performed the judges will then collectively pick the 2 best choirs to proceed to the final battle. In the final battle both choirs will perform the same song originally performed by that week's guest judge and try and out sing their opponent, while the choirs are performing the judges will deliberate and the guest judge will then join both choirs on stage and sing alongside the winning choir, that choir will then advance to the live final where they will perform a song with their guest judge.

=== Episode 1 ===
- Group performance: "Sing"/ "Shout"/ "Scream & Shout"/ "Sing"/ "Twist and Shout"

Performances on the first show
Order	Choir	Song one	Riff-off	Coaches and artists choices			Result
Order	Choir	Song one	Riff-off	Will	Kelis	Gareth	Result
1	LMA Choir	"Just the Way You Are"	"Heaven Must Be Missing an Angel"/ "Angel"/ "Pretty Little Angel Eyes"	✔	✔	-	Advanced
1	The Uptone Girls	"Changing"/ "Afterglow"/ "Waiting All Night"	"There Must Be an Angel (Playing with My Heart)"/ "Halo"/ "Angels"	-	-	✔	Eliminated
2	Leeds Contemporary Singers	"Runnin' (Lose It All)"	"Apologize"/ "Sorry Seems to Be the Hardest Word"/ "Hello"	✔	✔	✔	Advanced
2	Vocally Bespoke	"Hold Back the River"	"Sorry"/ "When All Is Said and Done"/ "I Should Have Known Better"	-	-	-	Eliminated
3	Vocal Dimension Chorus	"Sweet Dreams (Are Made of This)"	"The One and Only"/ "Born This Way"/ "I'm Too Sexy"	-	-	-	Eliminated
3	A Flame	"Unconditionally"	"Love Yourself"/ "Beautiful"/ "Love Myself"	✔	✔	✔	Advanced
Solo battle
1	LMA Choir	"Purple Rain"		-	-	-	Advanced
2	Leeds Contemporary Singers	"I Wanna Dance with Somebody (Who Loves Me)"		-	-	-	Advanced
3	A Flame	"Who You Are"		-	-	-	Eliminated
Final battle
1	LMA Choir	"Evergreen"		-	-	-	Runners-up
2	Leeds Contemporary Singers	"Evergreen"		-	-	-	Winners

=== Episode 2 ===
- Group performances: "Best Song Ever"/ "Shut Up and Dance"/ "Just Dance"/ "Into the Groove"/ "Dancing Queen"/ "Can't Stop the Feeling!"

Performances on the second show
Order	Choir	Song one	Riff-off	Coaches and artists choices			Result
Order	Choir	Song one	Riff-off	Chaka	Kelis	Gareth	Result
1	ScotSoul	"Castle on the Hill"	"Marvin Gaye"/ "Rasputin"/ "Grace Kelly"	✔	✔	-	Advanced
1	Out of the Blue	"Livin' la Vida Loca"	"Moves like Jagger"/ "Vincent"/ "Vogue"	-	-	✔	Eliminated
2	City Academy Songbirds	"Hold On"	"Count On Me"/ "Umbrella"/ "Friend Like Me"	-	-	-	Eliminated
2	Soul Train	"Human"	"I'll Be There for You"/ "With a Little Help from My Friends"/ "Army"	✔	✔	✔	Advanced
3	The Flyboys	"Livin' on a Prayer"	"Beggin'"/ "Please Don't Leave Me"/ "Don't Leave Me This Way"	✔	✔	✔	Advanced
3	The Noteables	"Some Nights"	"Mercy"/ "Please Don't Go"/ "Is There Something I Should Know?"	-	-	-	Eliminated
Solo battle
1	Soul Train	"Ordinary People"		-	-	-	Eliminated
2	ScotSoul	"Clown"		-	-	-	Advanced
3	The Flyboys	"Fever"/ "Tainted Love"		-	-	-	Advanced
Final battle
1	ScotSoul	"Ain't Nobody"		-	-	-	Winners
2	The Flyboys	"Ain't Nobody"		-	-	-	Runners-up

=== Episode 3 ===
- Group performance: "Get the Party Started"/ "Good Feeling"/ "Good Time"/ "1999"/ "(You Gotta) Fight for Your Right (To Party!)"/ "Get Lucky"

Performances on the third show
Order	Choir	Song one	Riff-off	Coaches and artists choices			Result
Order	Choir	Song one	Riff-off	Bebe	Kelis	Gareth	Result
1	All The King's Men	"Worth It"	"Holding Out for a Hero"/ "Hero"/ "Flash"	✔	-	✔	Advanced
1	Alle Choir	"Fly me to the Moon"	"Heroes (We Could Be)"/ "Hero"/ "Spider-Man"	-	✔	-	Eliminated
2	London International Gospel Choir	"I Want You Back"/ "ABC"	"Disco Inferno"/ "Relight My Fire"/ "Set Fire to the Rain"	✔	-	-	Eliminated
2	Songbird Sessions	"You've Got The Love"	"Burn"/ "St. Elmo's Fire (Man in Motion)"/ "Firework"	-	✔	✔	Advanced
3	Sgarmes	"The Edge of Glory"	"We Are Never Ever Getting Back Together / "Cry Me a River" / "Since U Been Gone"	✔	✔	✔	Advanced
3	The 4 Tune Tellers And Kimmy	"Bang Bang"	"You Give Love a Bad Name" / "Cry Me a River" / "I'm Still Standing"	-	-	-	Eliminated
Solo battle
1	All The King's Men	"Left Hand Free"		-	-	-	Advanced
2	Songbird Sessions	"How Deep Is Your Love?"		-	-	-	Eliminated
3	Sgarmes	"Somebody to Love"		-	-	-	Advanced
Final battle
1	All The King's Men	"Take Me Home"		-	-	-	Winner
2	Sgarmes	"Take Me Home"		-	-	-	Runners-up

- Sgarmes was later selected as the wildcard and performed in the final.

=== Episode 4 ===
- Group performance: "Seven Nation Army"/ "Survivor"/ "I Will Survive"/ "Harder, Better, Faster, Stronger"/ "Eye of the Tiger"/ "Fighter"

Performances on the fourth show
Order	Choir	Song one	Riff-off	Coaches and artists choices			Result
Order	Choir	Song one	Riff-off	Seal	Kelis	Gareth	Result
1	The Bristol Suspensions	"Car Wash"	"Lady Marmalade"/ "We No Speak Americano"/ "Hips Don't Lie"	✔	✔	✔	Advanced
1	Over The Water	"Cake by the Ocean"	"Voulez-Vous"/ "Tilted"/ "Rock Me Amadeus"	-	-	-	Eliminated
2	Perfect 6th	"Uptown Funk"	"You Are the Sunshine of My Life"/ "Walking on Sunshine"/ "Let the Sunshine In"	✔	✔	✔	Advanced
2	The Savannahs	"Wake Me Up"	"You Are My Sunshine"/ "Sunshine"/ "Let the Sun Shine"	-	-	-	Eliminated
3	Portsmouth University Gospel Choir	"Roar"	"Happy"/ "Don't Worry, Be Happy"/ "Be Young, Be Foolish, Be Happy"	-	✔	✔	Advanced
3	Vocal-I-sing	"Here I Go Again"	"Born to Make You Happy"/ "Oh Happy Day"/ "Get Happy/ Happy Days"	✔	-	-	Eliminated
Solo battle
1	The Bristol Suspensions	"I Can't Make You Love Me"		-	-	-	Eliminated
2	Perfect 6th	"How Far I'll Go"		-	-	-	Advanced
3	Portsmouth University Gospel Choir	"Thinking Out Loud"		-	-	-	Advanced
Final battle
1	Perfect 6th	"Kiss from a Rose"		-	-	-	Runners-up
2	Portsmouth University Gospel Choir	"Kiss from a Rose"		-	-	-	Winners

=== Episode 5 ===
- Group performance: "Die Young"/ "Beauty and a Beat"/ "Turn the Beat Around"/ "Boom Boom Pow"/ "Rhythm Nation"/ "Rhythm Is Gonna Get You"

Performances on the fifth show
Order	Choir	Song one	Riff-off	Coaches and artists choices			Result
Order	Choir	Song one	Riff-off	Joe	Kelis	Gareth	Result
1	Tring Park 16	"Believer"	"I Knew You Were Trouble"/ "Bridge over Troubled Water"/ "Trouble"	✔	✔	✔	Advanced
1	Crescendo	"Signed, Sealed, Delivered I'm Yours"/ "Baby I Need Your Loving"/ "Reach Out I'll Be There"	"Troublemaker"/ "Trouble"/ "Trouble with My Baby"	-	-	-	Eliminated
2	Vocalities	"Send My Love (To Your New Lover)"	"Single Ladies (Put a Ring on It)"/ "Dear Future Husband"/ "I Do, I Do, I Do, I Do, I Do"	-	-	-	Eliminated
2	The Ramparts	"Shape of You"	"Marry You"/ "Chapel of Love"/ "It Should Have Been Me"	✔	✔	✔	Advanced
3	Oxford Alternotives	"SOS"/ "Diamonds"/ "We Found Love"	"Rock and Roll"/ "Are You Lonesome Tonight?"/ "All by Myself"	-	-	-	Eliminated
3	VOX-XOVER	"Barcelona"	"Only the Lonely"/ "So Lonely"/ "On My Own"	✔	✔	✔	Advanced
Solo battle
1	Tring Park 16	"When I Was Your Man"		-	-	-	Advanced
2	VOX-XOVER	"Bring Me to Life"		-	-	-	Eliminated
3	The Ramparts	"Falling Slowly"		-	-	-	Advanced
Final battle
1	Tring Park 16	"Kissing Strangers"		-	-	-	Winners
2	The Ramparts	"Kissing Strangers"		-	-	-	Runners-up

== Live final ==
Group Performance: "Hold My Hand" / "My Life Would Suck Without You" / "We Are Family" / "Music Sounds Better With You" / "Nothing's Gonna Stop Us Now / "We're All In This Together" / "Symphony"

Guest Performers: Rita Ora – "Your Song"

Performances on the Final
Order	Choir	Duet	Riff-off	Coaches and artists choices			Result
Order	Choir	Duet	Riff-off	Deke	Kelis	Gareth	Result
1	ScotSoul	"I'm Every Woman" (with Chaka Khan)	"I'm A Believer" / "You Sexy Thing" / "When You Believe"	✔	✔	-	Advanced
1	Tring Park 16	"Remember I Told You" (with Nick Jonas)	"Believe" / "I Believe in a Thing Called Love" / "I Believe I Can Fly"	-	-	✔	Eliminated
2	All The King's Men	"The Way I Are (Dance with Somebody)" (with Bebe Rexha)	"Live While We're Young" / "Mad About the Boy" / "Crazy In Love"	✔	-	✔	Advanced
2	Portsmouth University Gospel Choir	"I Still Haven't Found What I'm Looking For" (with Seal)	"Crazy" / "Crazy" / "Crazy"	-	✔	-	Eliminated
3	Leeds Contemporary Singers	"Your Game" (with Will Young)	"Prince Charming" / "Royals" / "King of the Road" / "Dancing Queen"	✔	✔	✔	Advanced
3	Sgarmes	"I'll Be There (with Jermaine Jackson)	"My Name Is Prince" / "King" / "Killer Queen"	-	-	-	Eliminated
Acapella battle
1	ScotsSoul	"Lay Me Down"		-	-	-	Eliminated
2	All The King's Men	"Battlefield"		-	-	-	Advanced
3	Leeds Contemporary Singers	"Higher"		-	-	-	Advanced
Final battle
1	All The King's Men	"Rolling in the Deep"		-	-	-	Runners-up
2	Leeds Contemporary Singers	"Rolling in the Deep"		-	-	-	Winners
