= Sandi Toksvig =

Danish and British broadcaster, comedian and writer (born 1958)

Sandi Toksvig OBE
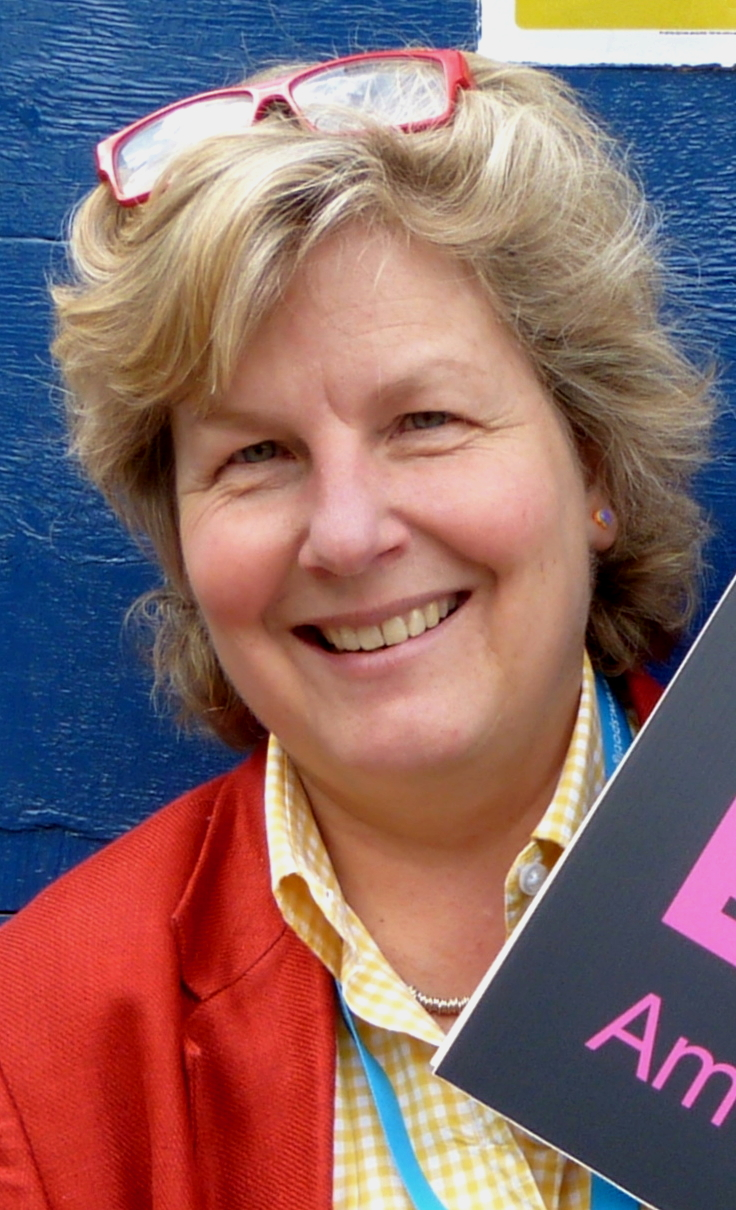
- Toksvig in 2013
- Born: Sandra Birgitte Toksvig; 3 May 1958 (age 68); Copenhagen, Denmark
- Citizenship: Denmark; United Kingdom
- Education: Girton College, Cambridge (BA)
- Occupations: Broadcaster; comedian; presenter; writer
- Spouse: Debbie Toksvig (m. 2007)
- Partner: Peta Stewart (1986–1997)
- Children: 3
- Parent: Claus Toksvig (father)
- Relatives: Signe Toksvig (great-aunt)
- Writing career
- Years active: 1982–present
- Website: sanditoksvig.com

Sandra Birgitte Toksvig (/ˈtɒksvɪɡ/; Danish: [ˈsænti ˈtsʰʌksˌviˀ]; born 3 May 1958) is a Danish-British broadcaster, comedian, presenter and writer on British radio, stage, and television. She has written plays, novels, and books for children. She is also a political activist, having co-founded the now-defunct Women's Equality Party in 2015. In 1994, Toksvig came out as a lesbian.

Toksvig took over from Stephen Fry as host of the BBC television quiz show QI in 2016 (series 'N'), having been a guest several times. She also spent ten years hosting The News Quiz on BBC Radio 4. From 2017 to 2020, she was co-presenter of The Great British Bake Off, alongside comedian Noel Fielding. In 2020, she stepped down and was replaced by Matt Lucas.

Toksvig was the president of the Women of the Year Lunch from 2015 to 2017.

== Early life and education ==
Sandra Birgitte Toksvig was born on 3 May 1958 in Copenhagen, Denmark. Her father, Claus Toksvig, was a Danish journalist, broadcaster, and foreign correspondent; as a result, Toksvig spent most of her youth outside Denmark, mostly in New York City. Her mother, Julie Anne Toksvig (née Brett), is British. She has an older brother, Nick, who is a journalist, and a younger sister, Jenifer, a librettist, who was born when Sandi was 12. When Sandi was 24, she was appointed Jenifer's legal guardian. In 1969, her father covered the landing of the first man on the moon from mission control; she was holding the hand of Neil Armstrong's secretary during the landing.

While her father was based in London, she attended Tormead School, an independent girls' school near Guildford. Her first job, at the age of 18, was as a follow spot operator for the musical Jesus Christ Superstar.

Toksvig is a graduate of Girton College, Cambridge, where she gained a first class honours degree in archaeology and anthropology, after changing from law after her Part I examinations. In 2019, Toksvig said in her memoirs that she was nearly expelled from her Cambridge college at the end of her first year, as the college council objected to her having another woman staying overnight in her room in college.

== Career ==
When I see comedian—and 'comedienne', of course I hate it—I think 'Oh, really?’ because I think of myself as a writer and broadcaster. Sometimes it's funny but I've just done a piece for Radio 3 all about Mary Wollstonecraft, and there's not a joke in it.

— The Times

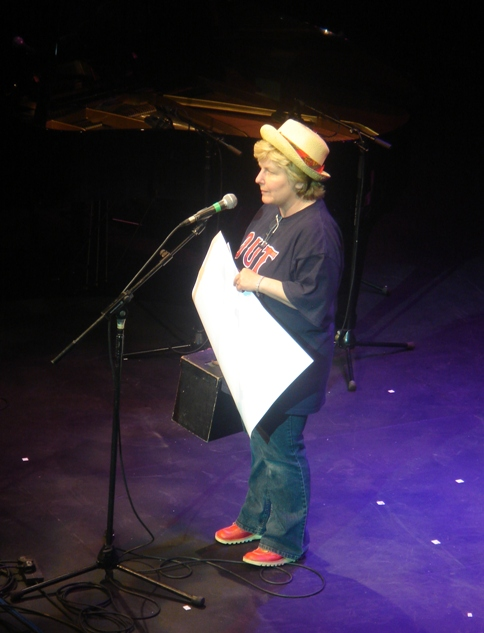
Toksvig performing in 2008

=== Beginnings ===
Toksvig began her comedy career at Girton, where she wrote and performed in the first all-woman show at the Footlights. She was there at the same time as Stephen Fry, Hugh Laurie, Tony Slattery and Emma Thompson, and wrote additional material for the Perrier award-winning Cambridge Footlights Revue. She was also a member of the Cambridge University Light Entertainment Society.

In 1982 she wrote for the Radio 4 comedy programme Three Plus One alongside Ian Hislop (with whom she would appear on the first episode of Have I Got News For You), Guy Jenkin and Andrea Solomons.

She started her television career on children's television, presenting No. 73 (1982–1986), the Sandwich Quiz, The Saturday Starship, Motormouth, Gilbert's Fridge, for Television South, and factual programmes such as Island Race and The Talking Show, produced by Open Media for Channel 4. In 2000, she appeared as a guest presenter on Time Team, at a dig in York (season 7 episode 13).

=== Comedy ===
In the comedy circuit, Toksvig performed at the first night of the Comedy Store in London, and was once part of their Players, an improvisational comedy team.

In television, she appeared as a panellist in comedy shows such as Call My Bluff (a regular as a team captain), Whose Line Is It Anyway?, Mock the Week, QI and Have I Got News for You, where she appeared on the first episode in 1990. She was also the host of What the Dickens, a Sky Arts quiz show.

On radio, she is a familiar voice for BBC Radio 4 listeners, having appeared on I'm Sorry I Haven't a Clue, The Unbelievable Truth, and as the chair of The News Quiz, where she replaced Simon Hoggart in September 2006, but left in June 2015 in order to enter politics to champion women's rights. Her final show was first broadcast on 26 June 2015. She presented Radio 4's travel programme Excess Baggage until it was axed in 2012.

=== Drama and factual ===
In 1993, Toksvig wrote a musical, Big Night Out at the Little Sands Picture Palace, for Nottingham Playhouse, co-starring with Anita Dobson and Una Stubbs. In 2002, it was re-written, with Dillie Keane, for the Watford Palace Theatre, in which they appeared with Bonnie Langford. Toksvig and Elly Brewer wrote a Shakespeare deconstruction, The Pocket Dream, which Toksvig performed at the Nottingham Playhouse and which transferred to the West End for a short run. The pair also wrote the 1992 TV series The Big One, in which she also starred. She has appeared in a number of stage plays, including Androcles and the Lion, Much Ado About Nothing and The Comedy of Errors.

In 1996, she narrated the Dragons! interactive CD-ROM published by Oxford University Press and developed by Inner Workings, along with Harry Enfield. The software was primarily aimed at children and featured songs and poems about dragons. She also narrated the Winnie the Witch CD-ROM. She appeared in the Doctor Who audio drama Red by Big Finish Productions, released in August 2006. In December 2006, she hosted and sang at the London Gay Men's Chorus sold-out Christmas show, Make the Yuletide Gay, at the Barbican Centre. Over Christmas and New Year 2007/2008, she narrated the pantomime Cinderella at the Old Vic Theatre. In October 2011, she narrated the new musical Soho Cinders at the Queen's Theatre, London. In 2011, she hosted a second season of BBC Two's Antiques Master.

Toksvig wrote a play entitled Bully Boy which focused on post-traumatic stress among British servicemen. The play premièred at the Nuffield Theatre in Southampton in May 2011, and starred Anthony Andrews. The play then launched the debut season of St James Theatre in September 2012, the first new West End theatre to open in 30 years.

In the 2013 Christmas Special of BBC's Call the Midwife, Toksvig made a cameo appearance as grumpy ward nurse Sister Gibbs.

On 28 April 2015, it was announced that Toksvig would leave BBC Radio 4's The News Quiz in June at the end of the 28th series, which was scheduled to begin on 15 May of that year. She said: "I have decided it is time to move on and, of course, I feel sad but I think it's the right moment. The show is in great shape and, like a good house guest, you should always depart when people still wish you'd stay a bit longer." The BBC said Toksvig had made the "difficult decision" to leave in order "to embark on a new and exciting stage of her career". On 30 April 2015, Toksvig announced that her decision to quit The News Quiz had been made in order to allow her to help set up a new political party named the Women's Equality Party.

In November 2015, Toksvig was a guest of BBC Radio 4's Desert Island Discs. Her choices included Joe Nichols ("What's a Guy Gotta Do"), Gustav Winckler, The Weather Girls, Barbra Streisand and Bonnie Langford. Her book choice was The Ashley Book of Knots, and her luxury item was an endless supply of the Daily Mail for use as clothing, insulation and toilet paper.

Her play Silver Lining opened at the Rose Theatre Kingston on 11 February 2017, before touring to Portsmouth, Oxford, Cambridge, Ipswich, Keswick, York and Salford. It centres on five elderly ladies and a young carer in a retirement home that is about to be flooded by a storm. The production starred Rachel Davies, Keziah Joseph, Maggie McCarthy, Joanna Monro, Sheila Reid and Amanda Walker. Toksvig's son, Theo Toksvig-Stewart, made his professional stage debut in Silver Lining.

On 11 June 2019, Toksvig appeared on former Prime Minister of Australia Julia Gillard's podcast. She commented: "Wikipedia is a marvellous idea and the idea is that it is a crowd-sourced encyclopaedia of knowledge, what a fantastic notion. But what's happening is that women are disappearing, so 90 per cent of Wikipedia's content is about men and their achievements, and 9% is about women... I am intent on trying to change this if we can".

During the COVID-19 lockdown period in 2020, Toksvig created and performed "Vox Tox", a YouTube mini-series, from her home. These 10-minute sessions promoted the activities of women across the ages, being inspired by items from Toksvig's own library of books and biographies.

Toksvig collaborated with Björn Ulvaeus on "Mamma Mia: The Party" in 2018, leading to her officiating at his wedding to Christina Sas in Copenhagen on 21 September 2024.

==== Mappa Mundi ====
In 2025, as an affiliated researcher in the Department of Sociology, University of Cambridge, Toksvig started to lead a new Mappa Mundi project (named after the 13th century map), a partnership between the University of Cambridge Faculty of Education and the Leverhulme Centre for the Future of Intelligence. The project aims to create a digital atlas documenting the voices, experiences and expertise of women around the world, countering existing biases on the web—with Toksvig highlighting Wikipedia's issues as an example. Additionally, in October 2026, Toksvig scolded Wikipedia because she believes there is insufficient coverage of women.

She has described the project as "an alternative to Wikipedia" and said it should be subject to academic scrutiny by universities.

=== Writing ===
Toksvig has written more than twenty fiction and non-fiction books for children and adults, starting in 1994 with Tales from the Norse's Mouth, a fiction tale for children. In 1995, she sailed around the coast of Britain with John McCarthy, who had been held hostage in Beirut. In 2003, she published Gladys Reunited: A Personal American Journey, about her travels in the USA retracing her childhood. She writes regular columns for Good Housekeeping, the Sunday Telegraph and The Lady. In October 2008, she published Girls Are Best, a history book for girls.

In 2009, her collected columns for The Sunday Telegraph were published in book form as The Chain of Curiosity. In 2012, she published her book, Valentine Grey, a historical novel set in the Boer War. Her 2006 young adult book, Hitler's Canary, is a Holocaust story told by a boy named Bamse and his family. The characters are based on Toksvig's own father and grandmother; the family heroism in the story closely resembles the author's father's own experiences during the war. Her memoir Between the Stops: The View of My Life from the Top of the Number 12 Bus was published on 29 October 2019.

In 2020, Toksvig wrote and presented a podcast series called We Will Get Past This, which aimed to provide "virtual chicken soup for the soul" during the COVID-19 lockdown in the UK, by sharing stories of notable women from her book collection.

=== Television presenter ===
In 2012–13 Toksvig presented 1001 Things You Should Know for Channel 4 daytime. Toksvig began presenting the revival edition of the daytime game show Fifteen-to-One in April 2014. It is an hour-long instead of the original half-hour edition presented by William G. Stewart. After two series had been broadcast, in June 2015, Channel 4 announced that a further eight series would be made, hosted by Toksvig until the revived series ended on 28 June 2019.

Toksvig took over from Stephen Fry as host of QI, making her "the first female presenter of a British mainstream TV comedy panel show", a fact she found extraordinary in 2016. Her first appearance as host (or Bantermeister) was the first episode of the show's series "N", which was broadcast on 21 October 2016.

On 16 March 2017, she was announced as the new co-presenter of The Great British Bake Off on Channel 4, alongside Noel Fielding. They replaced the previous hosts, Sue Perkins and Mel Giedroyc. In January 2020, she announced she was leaving the show to focus on other work commitments, and was replaced by Matt Lucas.

Toksvig presented Channel 4's four-part travel series Extraordinary Escapes with Sandi Toksvig, which premiered on 10 February 2021. In December 2021, Channel 4 renewed the series for a second series, which premiered on 17 February 2022. Series three premiered on 7 June 2023. She also presented The Great Big Tiny Design Challenge on Channel 4 which premiered in 2022.

In January 2025, Toksvig presented "Sandi's Great British Woodland Restoration"; a Channel 4 three-part documentary series.

In September 2026, More4 aired the two-part documentary Sandi's Ireland: A Literary Journey; in which Toksvig delves into Ireland's rich literary heritage.

== Politics and activism ==
Toksvig first came to wider public prominence in 1994 because the charity Save the Children dropped her services as compère of its 75th anniversary celebrations after she came out as gay. The decision led to a direct action protest by the Lesbian Avengers, and the charity apologised.

In 2003, she stood as a candidate in the election for the Chancellorship of the University of Oxford, supporting a campaign against student fees. She was defeated in the first round of voting, achieving 1,179 first-place votes out of about 8,000 cast. The election was won by Chris Patten. Almost a decade later she succeeded Sheila Hancock as Chancellor of the University of Portsmouth.

Toksvig supports the charity and pressure group Liberty, hosting its 2012 awards ceremony. She was appointed president of the Women of the Year Lunch. An atheist and humanist, Toksvig is a patron of Humanists UK.

In October 2012, as the scale of the Jimmy Savile sexual abuse scandal became apparent, and amid claims that during the 1960s, 1970s and 1980s, there was a culture within the BBC which tolerated sexual harassment, Toksvig stated that she was groped by a "famous individual" on air in the 1980s. Toksvig said the allegations of inappropriate behaviour at the BBC "did not surprise me at all". In September 2018, as the BBC gender-pay-gap controversy continued to unfold, Toksvig reported that she was only paid 40% of what Fry, her predecessor, had received. Toksvig had earlier told the Radio Times it would be "absurd" if she did not receive the same salary as him for chairing QI.

Toksvig's party-political sympathies have developed over the years. She was part of Red Wedge's comedy tour in the 1980s, which supported the Labour Party. By the 2004 elections, she was a high-profile celebrity supporter of the Liberal Democrats. She has received some criticism for joking about the Tories in 2011 (they've "put the 'N' into cuts" to child benefit), but had said Prime Minister Theresa May is "a good person". She has also joked about Nigel Farage. In 2012, she stated in an interview: "I don't think there's a party that represents anything I believe in."

In 2023, Toksvig said that the reluctance of the Church of England to accept same sex marriage was harming gay people. She campaigned to end 26 Church of England bishops sitting in the House of Lords. Later that year, she spoke with Louis Staples for the i newspaper about this, saying "They don't deal with gay people or women in an equitable manner. And they aren't some sort of obscure organisation—this is our state church". She also spoke of her "distress" at "people who call themselves 'radical feminists' but are anti-trans".

Toksvig was an unsuccessful candidate in the 2025 University of Cambridge Chancellor election, which resulted in the election of Chris Smith.

=== Women's Equality Party ===
In April 2015, Toksvig chaired the first, informal, conference of a new political party, the Women's Equality Party, and then left her job as presenter of The News Quiz to formally co-found it. In September the same year, she announced the dates for a comedy tour to raise funds for the party. The party's full set of policies was launched at Conway Hall, 20 October 2015.

The party was dissolved in 2024.

== Personal life ==
I wouldn't care if they came from Tesco. I don't care about the blood thing. They call me Mummy and I earned it. We love each other. You can't do better than that. Lots of families don't.

— Toksvig commenting on her children in The Times

Toksvig is the mother of two daughters and a son, born in 1988, 1990, and 1994. The children were carried by her partner, Peta Stewart, and were conceived through artificial insemination by donor Christopher Lloyd-Pack, younger brother of the actor Roger Lloyd-Pack.

In 1994, Toksvig came out as a lesbian. It was having three young children that made her decide to come out, because there were no out lesbians in British public life, and she did not want her children to grow up ashamed of having two mothers. Toksvig was warned she might never work again, and the family faced death threats and had to go into hiding.

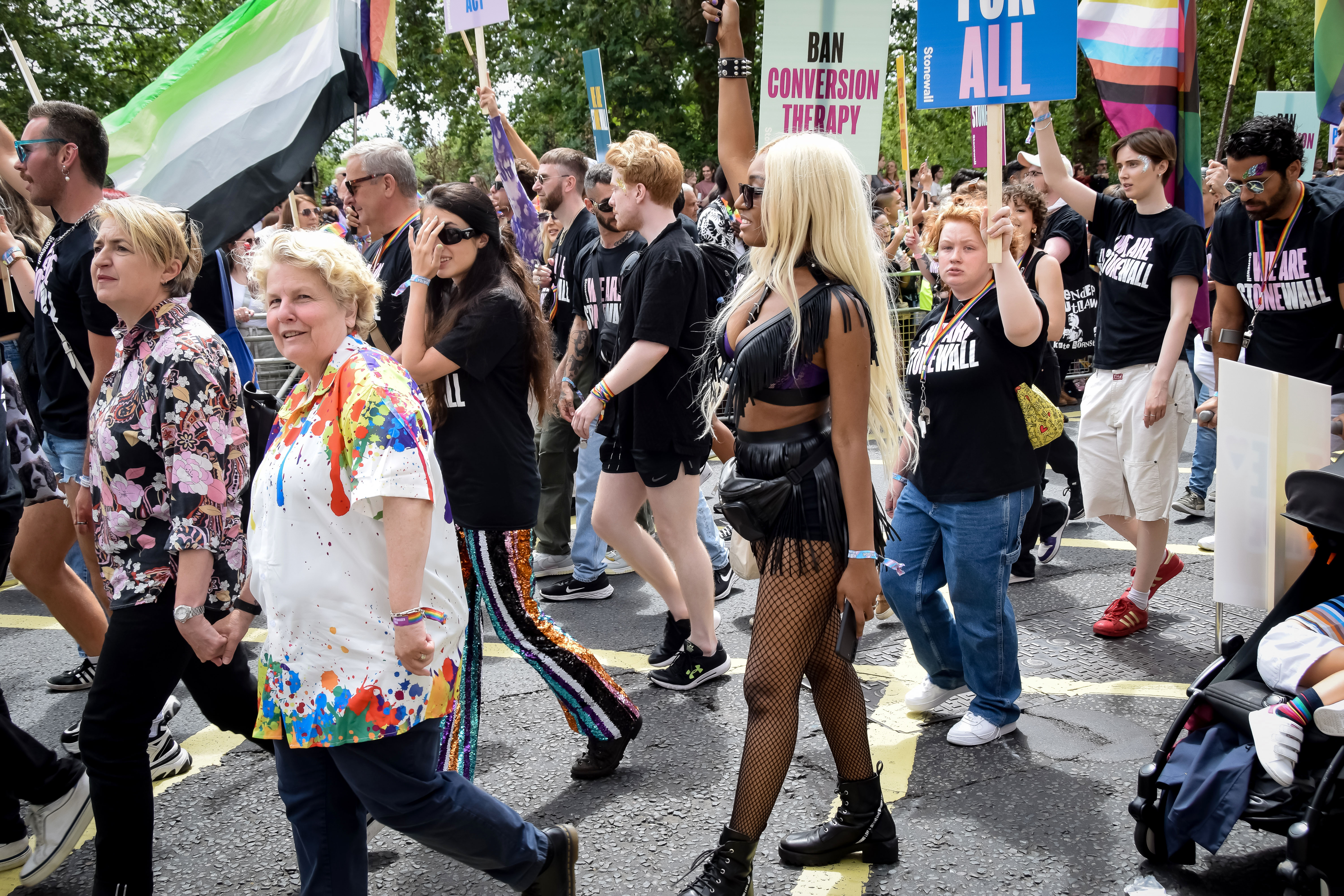
Sandi and Debbie Toksvig holding hands at Pride in London 2023

Toksvig and Stewart separated in 1997.

Later, Toksvig lived on a houseboat in Wandsworth with psychotherapist Debbie (now Debbie Toksvig), whom she joined in a civil partnership in 2007. They renewed their vows on 29 March 2014, the day same-sex marriage was introduced in England and Wales, and in December 2014, their civil partnership was converted into a marriage.

Toksvig became a British citizen in 2013. She describes her "posh" accent as being the result of a deliberate attempt to copy the voice of Celia Johnson in the 1945 film Brief Encounter, after being ostracised at boarding school for having an American accent.

In her late fifties, Toksvig lost a significant amount of weight on medical advice and credits this with giving her the confidence to go back to television.

In late 2022, Toksvig was hospitalised in Australia with bronchial pneumonia, and was forced to cancel her upcoming New Zealand tour dates. On 15 December 2022, it was reported that she had returned to the UK.

== Honours and awards ==
- 1997 – The Grand Order of Water Rats Show Business Personality of the Year
- 2007 – Political Humourist of the Year at the Channel 4 Political Awards and 2007 – Radio Broadcaster of the Year by the Broadcasting Press Guild
- 2007 – Read it or Else Award from Coventry Inspiration Book Awards for Hitler's Canary
- 2008 – Broadcaster of the Year at the Stonewall Awards
- 2009 – Voice of the Listener & Viewer Award for Individual Contribution to Radio
- 2013 – Voice of the Listener & Viewer Award for Excellence in Broadcasting (Roberts Radio Special Award)
- 2017 – CoScan (Confederation of Scandinavian Societies) International Award
- 2025 – Bollinger Everyman Wodehouse Prize (shortlisted) for Friends of Dorothy
- 2026 – Heinz Oberhummer Award

=== National honours ===
Decorations and medals

Country	Date	Decoration	Details
United Kingdom	31 December 2013	Officer of the Order of the British Empire (OBE)	Civil Division; Appointed in the 2014 New Years Honours List

=== Scholastic ===
University degrees

Location	Date	School	Degree
United Kingdom		Girton College, Cambridge	First-class honours Bachelor of Arts (BA) in Archaeology and Anthropology

Chancellor, visitor, governor, rector and fellowships

Location	Date	School	Position
United Kingdom	31 October 2012–2017	University of Portsmouth	Chancellor
United Kingdom	2012	Lucy Cavendish College, Cambridge	Honorary Fellowship
United Kingdom	2016	Newnham College, Cambridge	Honorary Fellowship
United Kingdom	29 January 2019	Girton College, Cambridge	Honorary Fellowship
United Kingdom	6 October 2023	Christ's College, Cambridge	Bye Fellow; Q+ fellowship
United Kingdom	2 October 2026	St Catherine's College, Oxford	Honorary Fellowship

Honorary degrees

Location	Date	School	Degree	Gave commencement address
United Kingdom	2010	University of Portsmouth	Doctor of Letters (D.Litt.)	
United Kingdom	2012	York St John University	Doctor of Letters (D.Litt.)	
United Kingdom	20 July 2012	University of Surrey	Doctor of Letters (D.Litt.)	
United Kingdom	2016	University of Westminster	Doctor of Letters (D.Litt.)	
United Kingdom	17 July 2018	University of Leicester	Doctor of Letters (D.Litt.)	Yes
United Kingdom	2 November 2026	Bournemouth University	Doctor of Science (DSc)	Yes

== Bibliography ==
=== Books for adults ===
- Toksvig, Sandi; et al. (1994). Great Journeys of the World. BBC Books. ISBN 0-563-37050-5.
- ——; McCarthy, John (1995). Island Race: an Improbable Voyage Round the Coast of Britain. BBC Books. ISBN 0-563-37053-X.
- —— (1999). Whistling for the Elephants. Transworld. ISBN 0-593-04480-0.
- —— (2001). Flying Under Bridges. Little, Brown. ISBN 0-316-85635-5.
- —— & Nightingale, Sandy (2002). The Travels of Lady Bulldog Burton. Little, Brown. ISBN 0-316-86007-7.
- —— (2003). Gladys Reunited: A Personal American Journey. Little, Brown. ISBN 0-7515-3328-9.
- —— (2006). Melted into Air. Little, Brown. ISBN 0-316-86117-0.
- —— (2012). Heroines & Harridans – A Fanfare of Fabulous Females. illustrated by Sandy Nightingale. The Robson Press. ISBN 978-1849-54-3385.
- —— (2012). Valentine Grey. Virago. ISBN 9781844088317.
- —— (2013). Peas & Queues: The Minefield of Modern Manners. Profile Books. ISBN 978-1781-25032-7.
- —— (2019). Between the Stops: The view of My Life from the Top of the number 12 Bus. Virago. ISBN 978-0-349-00637-6.
- —— (2020). Toksvig's Almanac. Trapeze. ISBN 9781398701632.
- —— (2024). Friends of Dorothy. Little, Brown. ISBN 9780349019017.

=== Books for children ===
- —— (1994). Tales from the Norse's Mouth. BBC Books. ISBN 0-563-40358-6.
- —— (1997). Unusual Day. Transworld/Corgi. ISBN 0-552-54539-2.
- —— (1998). If I Didn't Have Elbows. Deagosti. ISBN 1-84089-048-7.
- —— (1999). Super-Saver Mouse. Transworld. ISBN 0-552-54540-6.
- —— (2000). Super-Saver Mouse to the Rescue. Transworld. ISBN 0-552-54541-4.
- —— (2000). The Troublesome Tooth Fairy. Transworld. ISBN 0-552-54663-1.
- —— (2005). Hitler's Canary. Doubleday. ISBN 0-385-60889-6.
- —— (2006). Hitlers Canary (in Dutch). Vlaardingen, Holland: Valerius uitgeverij. ISBN 90-78250-02-X.
- —— (2008). The Littlest Viking. London: Yearling. ISBN 978-0-440-86830-9.
- —— (2009). Girls Are Best. London: Red Fox. ISBN 978-1-86230-429-1.
- —— (2015). A Slice of the Moon. London: Doubleday Childrens. ISBN 978-0-857-53191-9.
- —— (2017). The End of the Sky. London: Doubleday Childrens. ISBN 978-0-857-53192-6.

Party political offices
New political party	Co-founder of the Women's Equality Party; 2015; With: Catherine Mayer	Succeeded by Sophie Walker as leader
