= Dinnington Colliery Band =

British brass band

- Brass Band
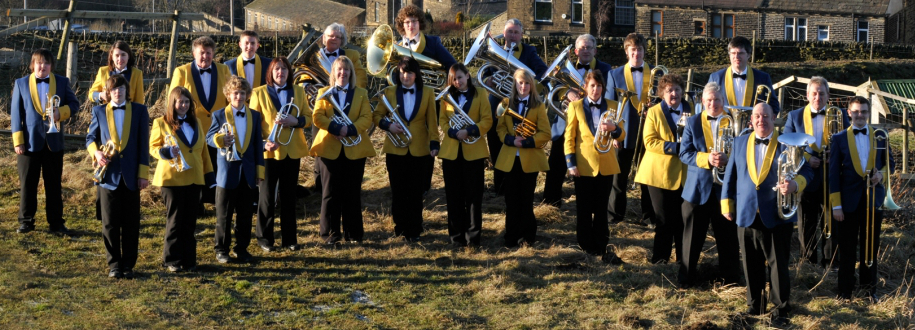
- The Dinnington Colliery Band, Dinnington, 2010
- Former name: Dinnington (Middleton) Silver Brass Band, Dinnington and Middleton, Dinnington Main & Middleton, Dinnington Main Colliery Prize Band, Dinnington Main Colliery Welfare, South Yorkshire Caravans Dinnington, Webster (Dinnington Colliery) Band, Websters Dinnington Colliery
- Founded: 1904 (122 years ago)
- Location: Dinnington, South Yorkshire, England
- Music director: Jonathan Beatty
- Website: dinningtoncollieryband.co.uk

The Dinnington Colliery Band is a traditional British brass band from Yorkshire, England, founded in 1904 and also known as the Dinnington Main and Middleton prize brass band for some of its history. Between 1982 and 1985 the band was sponsored by South Yorkshire Caravans, and 1987–1990 by Webster Mining Machinery. The band currently compete in the Third Section of the Yorkshire Region.

The Dinnington Colliery Band consisted of 35 members aged between 7 and 80 from the former coal mining town of Dinnington in South Yorkshire, England. As in many traditional British mining towns, once the colliery closed in 1992 the band went into decline, ending up with only six members by 2009.

In 2010, the BBC chose Dinnington from a shortlist of 22 other brass bands to feature in a three-part series A Band For Britain presented and conducted by Sue Perkins. The recruitment drive that followed enabled the band to enlist 21 new members, and a resulting recording contract worth £1 million secured the band's future survival.

As of 2014, the band are actively fundraising to represent Yorkshire in the National Finals in Cheltenham in September. Despite popular misconceptions that the band received payment for taking part in 'A Band for Britain', this was not the case, and they face the same financial challenges as other brass bands, and indeed other registered charities. The £100,000 payment from their CD 'A Band for Britain' is currently held in a fund towards the building of a new band room.

== Discography ==
=== Albums ===
- 2010: A Band For Britain
