= ....And Proud =

- Also known as: ....and Proud
- Genre: Documentary
- Created by: ITV Productions
- Presented by: Various
- Starring: Sue Perkins
- Country of origin: United Kingdom
- Original language: English
- No. of seasons: 1
- No. of episodes: 6

Production
- Running time: 60 minutes

Original release
- Network: Virgin 1
- Release: 24 July – 28 August 2008

....And Proud (stylized as ....and Proud) is a series of documentaries created for Virgin 1 designed to examine people who lead lifestyles tied to taboo subjects, narrated by Sue Perkins.

== Episodes ==
No. overall	No. in season	Title	Original release date	Viewers (millions)
1	1	"Bunny Boiler and Proud"	24 July 2008	N/A
Explores the lives of men and women who go to excessive lengths to make themselves heard by a partner or ex-partner.
2	2	"Sex Maniac and Proud"	31 July 2008	N/A
Explore what it is like to be constantly aroused.
3	3	"Kinky and Proud"	8 August 2008	N/A
A top 10 of the kinkiest behaviours.
4	4	"Gold Digger and Proud"	14 August 2008	N/A
A shamelessly frothy look at gold-diggers and the equally appalling sugar daddies whom they bleed dry.
5	5	"Cradle Snatcher and Proud"	21 August 2008	N/A
Men and women who are in relationships with partners young enough to be their children.
6	6	"Love Rat and Proud"	28 August 2008	N/A
The nation's most outrageous womanisers, man-eaters and cheaters.
