= What the Dickens =

- Genre: Comedy
- Presented by: Sandi Toksvig
- Starring: Team Captains; Tim Brooke-Taylor (Series 1); Dave Gorman (Series 1); Sue Perkins (Series 2–3); Chris Addison (Series 2–3)
- Country of origin: United Kingdom
- Original language: English
- No. of series: 3
- No. of episodes: 22

Production
- Running time: 30 minutes

Original release
- Network: Sky Arts
- Release: 28 May 2008 – 1 July 2009

What the Dickens was a television panel game hosted by Sandi Toksvig. Team captains were Dave Gorman and Tim Brooke-Taylor for the first series, and Sue Perkins and Chris Addison for the second and third. It was recorded at Sky Studios in West London.

== Transmissions ==
Series	Start date	End date	Episodes
1	28 May 2008	2 July 2008	6
2	12 November 2008	14 January 2009	10
3	27 May 2009	1 July 2009	6

== Rounds of the show ==
=== 3 Steps to Heaven ===
Each team viewed up to three picture clues to help them identify a book, film, play, or musical from the world of fine arts and entertainment, scoring three points if they guessed the correct answer after just one picture clue, two after two, and one after all three were revealed. If they failed to guess, the other side could guess for one point.

=== Love It or Loathe It ===
Each of the guests (or team captains at least once when a guest appeared twice) chose a subject from the world of arts and entertainment and had to present two arguments, one claiming they loved the subject and the other claiming they loathed it. If the opposition could guess correctly whether the guest loved or loathed the subject, they scored two points. If not, the guest making the arguments got two points.

=== Yes, and I'm Mickey Mouse ===
Played only in series 1 and 2. The teams met members of the general public who coincidentally shared their names with characters from books, films, TV shows, plays, or musicals. They had 90 seconds to ask yes or no questions to the mystery guest and then take a guess, for two points if guessed correctly. If wrong, Sandi threw it over to the other side for one point.

=== Common People ===
Played only in Series 3, replacing Yes, and I'm Mickey Mouse. The teams were shown three famous people and had to guess what all three had in common.

=== Losing the Plot ===
The final quickfire round. Each team captain had 90 seconds to communicate the titles of books, films, plays, musicals, or TV shows, without using any proper names. A common running gag in series 2 and 3 emerged when Sue Perkins pretended to get angry with her teammates when they had troubles guessing, leading her to continuously rant on and on, and in the process, saying the titles, and leaving no time for the other person to speak. Nicholas Parsons was one teammate that had to sit and let her rant when she pretended to get angry, although he could only watch with a surprised look on his face. Because of this running gag, Chris Addison won more games than Perkins in all cases where she ranted, though he didn't necessarily win more games overall.

Comedian Richard Herring (a teammate of Perkins) scored a record 10 points in this round, and Germaine Greer (a teammate of Addison's) had to humorously guess her own 1970 international best-selling book, The Female Eunuch.

== Episodes ==
The coloured backgrounds denote the result of each of the shows:

– indicates Tim's / Chris' team won.
– indicates Dave's / Sue's team won.
– indicates the game ended in a draw.

=== Series 1 ===
Episode	First broadcast	Tim's guest	Dave's guest
1x01	28 May 2008	Robin Ince	Rory McGrath
1x02	4 June 2008	Marcus Brigstocke	Adam Boulton
1x03	11 June 2008	Stephen K. Amos	Ian McMillan
1x04	18 June 2008	Rich Hall	Dom Joly
1x05	25 June 2008	Andre Vincent	Rosie Boycott
1x06	2 July 2008	Dom Joly	Paul Blezard

=== Series 2 ===
Episode	First broadcast	Chris' guest	Sue's guest	Score
2x01	12 November 2008	John O'Farrell	Robin Ince	16–8
2x02	19 November 2008	Jackie Clune	Alun Cochrane	10–8
2x03	26 November 2008	Andrew Collins	Russell Kane	13–12
2x04	3 December 2008	Phil Hammond	Dave Gorman	TBC
2x05	10 December 2008	Jenny Eclair and Mark Steel		TBC
2x06	17 December 2008	Graeme Garden and Will Smith		TBC
2x07	24 December 2008	Germaine Greer	Richard Herring	15–10
2x08	31 December 2008	Dave Gorman	Stephen K. Amos	7–7
2x09	7 January 2009	Josie Long	Jenny Eclair	12–11
2x10	14 January 2009	Lucy Porter	John O'Farrell	15–11

=== Series 3 ===
Episode	First broadcast	Chris' guest	Sue's guest	Score
3x01	27 May 2009	Jan Ravens	Rick Wakeman	11–10
3x02	3 June 2009	Frank Skinner	John O'Farrell	14–14
3x03	10 June 2009	Dave Gorman	Robin Ince	13–10
3x04	17 June 2009	Alistair McGowan	Nicholas Parsons	9–8
3x05	24 June 2009	Giles Coren	Josie Long	14–12
3x06	1 July 2009	Robin Ince	Lucy Porter	12-9
