= Sue Perkins =

British actress, singer, writer and comedian (born 1969)

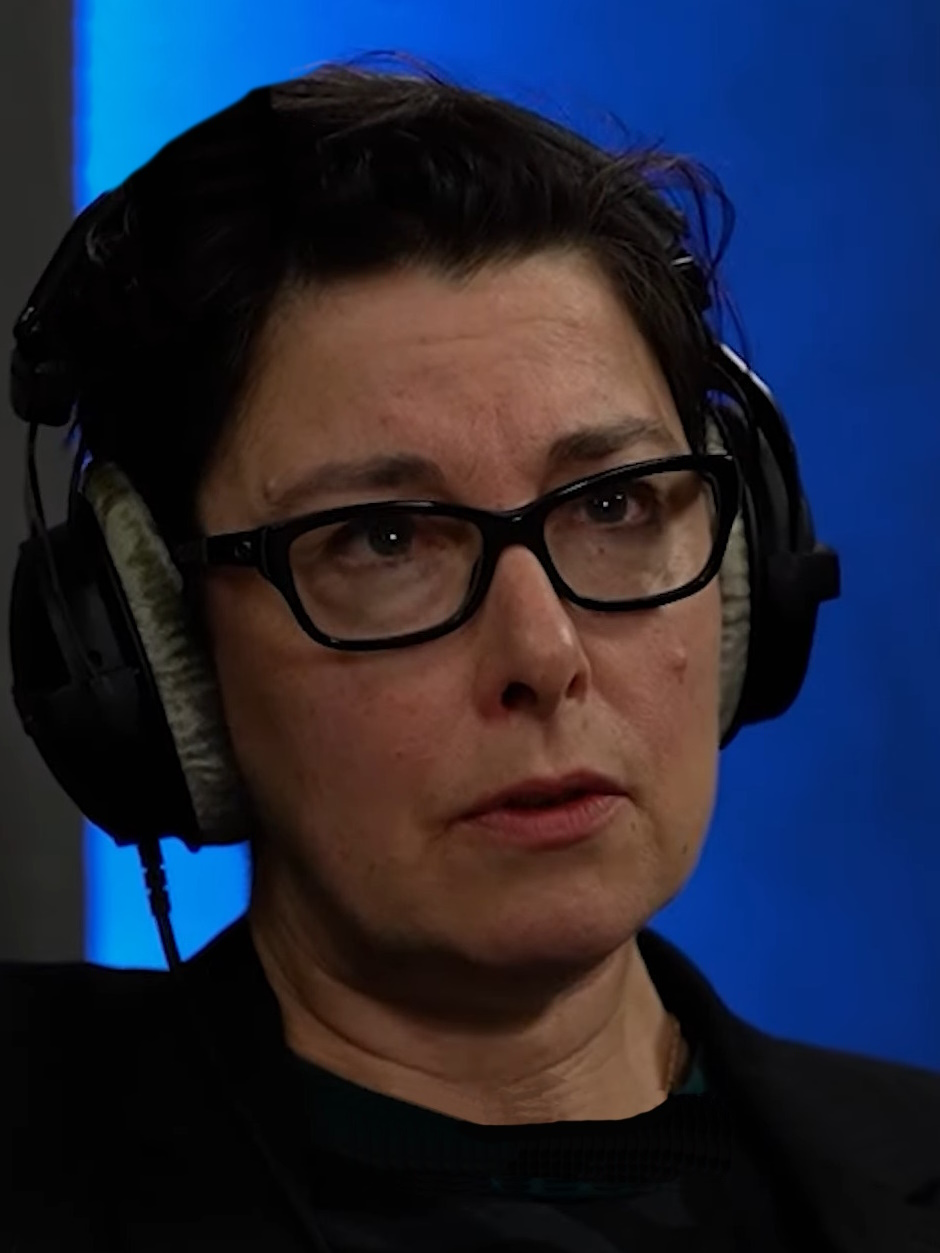
- Perkins in 2024
- Born: Susan Elizabeth Perkins; 22 September 1969 (age 57); London, England
- Education: New Hall, Cambridge (BA)
- Occupations: Actor; Broadcaster; Comedian; Presenter; Author
- Years active: 1993–present
- Partner: Anna Richardson (2014–2021)

Susan Elizabeth Perkins (born 22 September 1969) is an English broadcaster, comedian, actress, singer and writer. Originally coming to prominence through her comedy partnership with Mel Giedroyc in Mel and Sue, she progressed into radio and television presenting, notably of The Great British Bake Off (2010–2016), Insert Name Here (2016–2019) and Just a Minute (since 2021) on BBC Radio 4.

== Early life and education ==
Perkins was born on 22 September 1969 in Croydon, London, where she grew up with her two younger siblings, and her parents. Her father worked for a local car dealership and her mother was employed as a secretary. She was privately educated at Croham Hurst School, a girls' school in South Croydon, at the same time as television presenter Susanna Reid.

She later studied English at New Hall, Cambridge, graduating in 1991. While at Cambridge, she was a member of the Footlights, where she met Mel Giedroyc. She was Footlights president during the academic year 1990–91.

== Mel and Sue ==
Perkins and creative partner Mel Giedroyc took their first steps into television under the name Mel and Sue. The duo began to gain success and were short-listed for the Daily Express Best Newcomers award at the Edinburgh Festival in 1993. After a few years writing for French & Saunders (and occasionally appearing on their BBC series), they co-hosted a lunchtime show on Channel 4 entitled Light Lunch, and an early evening version, Late Lunch, which ran from March 1998 to February 1999.

In January 2015, Giedroyc and Perkins began hosting their own daytime chat show on ITV called Mel and Sue. In August 2015, it was announced that Mel and Sue had been cancelled by ITV. On 23 July 2017, it was confirmed that they would host a new version of The Generation Game for BBC One.

== Television ==
In 2002, Perkins appeared on the second UK series of Celebrity Big Brother in aid of four charities, Centrepoint, National Missing Persons Helpline, Rethink and Samaritans. During the series, she interacted with series winner Mark Owen from Take That, and TV presenter Les Dennis. Perkins was evicted from the house on Day 9.

She provided the voice for Messenger Bird in Dinotopia, produced for Hallmark Entertainment.

In 2003, Perkins joined Channel 4 morning television programme RI:SE. In the same year, Perkins also provided additional written material for BBC sitcom Absolutely Fabulous.

Perkins has appeared on several BBC shows including Have I Got News for You, Mock the Week, QI, Room 101, Celebrity Weakest Link, Question Time and Newsnight. She has made appearances as a field reporter for Armando Iannucci vehicle The Saturday Night Armistice.

Perkins hosted the second series of Good Evening, Rockall, a short-lived, news-oriented panel game shown on BBC Choice. In 2006, she appeared in BBC Four's vocabulary quiz show Never Mind the Full Stops. She was also a team captain on ITV's Win, Lose or Draw Late. During the same decade she made appearances on Celebrity MasterChef, Celebrity Poker and News Knight with Sir Trevor McDonald.

In April 2007, she participated in the television series, Edwardian Supersize Me for the BBC. She was joined by food critic Giles Coren. The series focused on spending a week eating the equivalent of a wealthy Edwardian couple's food, whilst wearing period clothing.

Following the series, Perkins and Coren were commissioned to present a new series called, The Supersizers Go.... The premise of "Edwardian Supersize Me" was replicated and focused on other periods throughout history.

In the first episode, they survived for a week on Second World War rations. It was re-commissioned for a second episode, Perkins and Coren covered the English Restoration period. The third episode covered the Victorian period, the fourth the 1970s, the fifth the Elizabethan period and the sixth the Regency period.

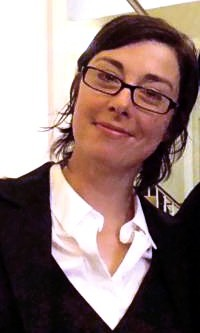
Perkins in 2008

In August and September 2008, Perkins appeared in the reality television series Maestro on BBC Two. During the series, a group of eight celebrities attempted (until eliminated) to learn to conduct orchestral, choral and operatic music. During the series, Perkins conducted three pieces, two of them with soprano soloist Lesley Garrett. Perkins won the series. In 2008, Perkins narrated the series ....And Proud on Virgin 1.

Perkins appeared in a second "Supersizers" series called The Supersizers Eat... with Giles Coren which aired on BBC Two in June and July 2009. In September and October 2009 she hosted the Channel 4 panel game The Big Food Fight.

She then gave a televised lecture for the Royal Television Society. Entitled "Wit's End? British Comedy at the Crossroads", the lecture focused on the state of British comedy. The presentation was broadcast on BBC Two.

In March 2010, Perkins appeared in a three-part mini-series on BBC Two, A Band for Britain, in which she attempted to revive the fortunes of the Dinnington Colliery Band.

In 2010, Perkins and Coren presented Giles and Sue Live the Good Life, a celebration of the 1970s BBC series The Good Life, where they were challenged to live a self-sufficient lifestyle.

Later that year, Perkins was joined by Mel Giedroyc to present The Great British Bake Off, a cookery competition with each episode looking at a different aspect of baking. They co-hosted the series for seven seasons. In September 2016, Love Productions announced that a three-year deal had been agreed to broadcast the show on Channel 4 instead of the BBC from 2017. Perkins and Giedroyc announced that they would not be continuing with Bake Off on its new network. Mary Berry announced she was also leaving Bake Off on the same day that fellow-judge Paul Hollywood separately announced he would be staying with the show.

Perkins narrated the 2011 game show Don't Scare the Hare. In October 2011, she presented a series on BBC Two called All Roads Lead Home. It featured Perkins learning how to use nature as a navigation tool. She was joined on the series by Alison Steadman and Stephen Mangan.

On 30 December 2011, she presented and performed Mrs Dickens's Family Christmas, a 60-minute documentary for BBC Two that examined the marriage of Charles Dickens through the eyes of his wife, Catherine.

Periodically, she has presented The Culture Show, including its broadcast from the Edinburgh Festival in August 2012. During that broadcast she interviewed Nile Rodgers, a member of the American disco-pop music group Chic.

In 2011, Perkins featured in the BBC travel adventure show World's Most Dangerous Roads: Alaska. She and Charley Boorman, her companion for the trip, drove the Dalton Highway. She then appeared with Liza Tarbuck in Series 2 Episode 2 of World's Most Dangerous Roads: Ho Chi Minh Trail, shown in 2012, driving in Vietnam and Laos. In November 2014 she returned to South-East Asia, travelling from the Mekong delta up to Tibet in The Mekong River with Sue Perkins, produced by Indus Films for the BBC. In September 2015, she presented a one-off show Kolkata with Sue Perkins on BBC One.

On 26 February 2013, the first episode of Perkins's self-penned sitcom, Heading Out, was broadcast. It was produced by Red Production Company and Square Peg TV. Perkins also portrayed the show's lead, Sara.

From 4 August 2014, she presented Cooks' Questions on More4.

Perkins was a team captain on the second and third series of What the Dickens?, hosted by Sandi Toksvig on Sky Arts.

In 2016, she began hosting the BBC Two panel show Insert Name Here and was a commentator on the BBC game show Can't Touch This. She co-presented The Big Spell, a weekly game show for Sky1 alongside Joe Lycett and Moira Stuart.

In September 2019 she presented Japan with Sue Perkins, a two part BBC travel series about life in Japan.

In 2021, she participated in the second series of The Masked Singer as "Dragon" and finished in fifth place.

In 2022, Perkins hosted and starred in the TV series Perfectly Legal.

Beginning in September 2023, Perkins appeared as a contestant on the 16th series of Taskmaster. She finished fourth.

== Conducting ==
Following her success in Maestro in 2008, Perkins guest-conducted the London Gay Symphony Orchestra on 11 October 2009, at St Anne's Church Garden in Soho. She conducted two pieces, The Simpsons Theme by Danny Elfman, and the William Tell Overture by Rossini, the latter for the first time.

As part of A Band for Britain, Perkins conducted the Dinnington Colliery Band at the DW Stadium playing the National Anthem for a Four Nations rugby match, and also conducted them together with the Grimethorpe Colliery Band at Sheffield City Hall.

Perkins again conducted the BBC Concert Orchestra at the first Comedy Prom at the Royal Albert Hall during the 2011 Prom season.

Perkins is associate conductor for the Orion Orchestra, a London-based orchestra consisting of students and graduates of the Royal College of Music, Royal Academy of Music and Guildhall School of Music and Drama.

== Radio ==
Perkins is a panel member on Radio 4's The News Quiz and has made regular appearances on Radio 2's It's Been a Bad Week. She was also a frequent panellist on another popular Radio 4 show, Just a Minute: in the 2012 television version, she appeared in four out of the 10 episodes (more than any other panellist except Paul Merton, who appeared in all 10) and won on all four occasions. After original Just a Minute host Nicholas Parsons died in Aylesbury on 28 January 2020, Perkins was part of the roster of guest hosts for the series, and in July 2021, she was announced as the new permanent host, starting with the 87th series.

She was the chair of Radio 4's The 99p Challenge until the show finished in 2004. Perkins appeared every day in the last half-hour of Mark Radcliffe's afternoon radio show on Radio 2, when he sat in for Steve Wright.

Between 2006 and 2007, Perkins was a panellist on a Radio 4 show, The Personality Test, a quiz show about the host, presented by a different host each week. Past hosts include Gyles Brandreth and Rick Wakeman, and other panellists include Robin Ince, Lucy Porter and Will Smith. She also provided the voiceovers at the start and end of each programme.

Perkins is a regular cast member of Count Arthur Strong's Radio Show!

Perkins presented a Radio 4 documentary on the Lake District's competition the "World's Biggest Liar", which she won.

In December 2008, she was a guest on Private Passions, the biographical music discussion programme on BBC Radio 3.

Perkins was also chair of the Radio 4 panel game Dilemma, in which four humorous guests discussed moral conundrums she provided for them. The first series ran for six episodes on Sunday evenings from 13 November to 18 December 2011. Another series of this programme ran in February 2013.

On 9 July 2017 Perkins was the guest celebrity on Radio 4's Desert Island Discs.

In February 2020, she began presenting a 6.30 pm comedy series on BBC Radio 4 called Nature Table, taking a humorous look at the natural world, recorded at ZSL London Zoo.

== Podcast ==
In 2025, Perkins and Giedroyc launched a podcast titled Mel and Sue: Should Know by Now on Audible.

== Books ==
Perkins was a judge for the 2009 Man Booker Prize.

Her memoir, Spectacles, was published in October 2015. In October 2018, she released an autobiographical travel book East of Croydon: Blunderings Through India and South East Asia, which was shortlisted in the 'Autobiography of the Year' category at the 2018 National Book Awards.

== Edinburgh Festival appearances ==
Perkins has performed two stand-up comedy solo shows at the Edinburgh Fringe Festival: Spectacle Wearer of the Year 2006 in 2005, and The Disappointing Second Show in 2006.

== Personal life ==
In August 2012, Perkins appeared on Tatler's list of high-profile lesbians in London. She was outed as a lesbian in 2002 by her ex-girlfriend Rhona Cameron during Cameron's appearance on ITV's I'm a Celebrity... Get Me Out of Here! Perkins has said that "being a lesbian is only about the 47th most interesting thing about me".

In April 2015, Perkins was the victim of online harassment on Twitter after oddsmakers made her the favourite to fill the vacancy on the BBC's Top Gear programme left by the departure of Jeremy Clarkson, despite Perkins saying that rumours about her imminent appointment to the show were "fabricated".

In September 2015, Perkins revealed that she was diagnosed with prolactinoma, which is a benign growth on her pituitary gland. She had received the diagnosis eight years previously. The side effects prevent her from having children.

Perkins was brought up as a Roman Catholic. She lives between Dartmouth Park, north London and Penzance, Cornwall. Between 2014 and 2021, she was in a relationship with TV presenter Anna Richardson.

Perkins has both English and German ancestry including a great-grandmother who was an ethnic German from what is now Lithuania.

== Filmography ==
=== Television ===
Year	Title	Role	Notes	Channel
1997–1998	Light Lunch	Co-presenter	4 series; with Mel Giedroyc	Channel 4
1998–1999	Late Lunch	Co-presenter	With Mel Giedroyc	Channel 4
2002	Casualty		Series 16	BBC One
2002	Celebrity Big Brother	Housemate	Series 2	Channel 4
2002–2003	RI:SE	Presenter		
2003-2005	Little Robots	Sparky 1	Series 1-5	CBeebies
2006	Celebrity MasterChef	Contestant	Series 1	BBC One
2007	Edwardian Supersize Me	Co-presenter	One-off programme; with Giles Coren	BBC Two
2008	The Supersizers Go...	Co-presenter	1 series; with Giles Coren	BBC Two
2008	The Supersizers Eat...	Co-presenter	1 series; with Giles Coren	BBC Two
2008	....And Proud	Narrator	1 series	Virgin 1
2009	What the Dickens	Team captain	2 series	Sky Arts
2010–2016	QI	Regular panellist	18 appearances	BBC Four/BBC Two/BBC One
2010–2016	The Great British Bake Off	Co-presenter	7 series; with Mel Giedroyc	BBC Two (2010–13); BBC One (2014–16)
2011	All Roads Lead Home	Presenter	1 series	BBC Two
2011	Don't Scare the Hare	Narrator	1 series	BBC One
2011–2012	World's Most Dangerous Roads	Contestant	2 episodes	BBC Two
2013	Heading Out	Sara	Also created and wrote the series	BBC Two
2014	Cooks' Questions	Presenter	1 series	More4
2014	The Mekong River with Sue Perkins	Presenter	1 series	BBC Two
2015	Mel & Sue	Co-presenter	1 series; with Mel Giedroyc	ITV
2015	Sue Perkins' Big Night Out	Presenter	One-off programme	BBC Two
2015	Kolkata with Sue Perkins	Presenter	One-off programme	BBC One
2015–2019	Thronecast	Co-presenter	4 series	Sky Atlantic
2016–2019	Insert Name Here	Presenter	4 series	BBC Two
2016	Can't Touch This	Commentator	1 series	BBC One
2017	The Big Spell	Co-presenter	1 series; with Joe Lycett and Moira Stuart	Sky1
2017	Let's Sing and Dance for Comic Relief	Co-presenter	1 series; with Mel Giedroyc	BBC One
2017	British Academy Television Awards	Presenter		BBC One
2017	Land of the Giants	Narrator	Documentary	BBC One Wales
2017	The Ganges with Sue Perkins	Presenter	Documentary series	BBC One
2017	Mary, Mel and Sue's Big Christmas Thank You	Co-presenter	One-off special; with Mel Giedroyc and Mary Berry	BBC One
2018	Sue Perkins and the Chimp Sanctuary	Presenter	One-off documentary	BBC Two
2018	The Generation Game	Co-presenter	1 series; with Mel Giedroyc	BBC One
2018	Lego Masters	Guest Judge	Series 2, Episode 5	Channel 4
2019	Apple and Onion	Additional voices	in episode "Apple's Focus"	Cartoon Network
2019	Japan with Sue Perkins	Presenter	2-part documentary	BBC One
2020	Sue Perkins: Along the US-Mexico Border	Presenter	2-part documentary	BBC One
2020–	Hitmen	Co-star	2 series; with Mel Giedroyc	Sky1
2020–2021	The Masked Singer	Dragon (contestant)	Series 2	ITV
2021, 2022	The Greatest Snowman	Presenter	Snow building competition	Channel 4
2022	Sue Perkins' Big American Road Trip	Presenter	2-part documentary	Channel 4
2022	Who Do You Think You Are?	Participant		BBC One
2022	Sue Perkins: Perfectly Legal	Presenter	3-part documentary	Netflix
2023	Patriot Brains	Presenter		TVNZ 2
2023	Taskmaster	Contestant	Series 16	Channel 4
2024	Sue Perkins: Lost In Alaska	Presenter	Three-part travel series	Channel 5
2024	Double The Money	Host	Game show	Channel 4
2024	Sue Perkins: Lost in Thailand	Presenter	Three-part travel series	Channel 5
2024	Sue Perkins' Big Adventure: Paris To Istanbul	Presenter	Six-part travel series	Channel 4
2025	Chess Masters: The Endgame	Presenter	Eight-part series	BBC Two
2025	Win Win	Co-host	Game show; with Mel Giedroyc	ITV1
