= Letterbox (2017 game show) =

British game show

- Genre: Game show
- Presented by: Mel Giedroyc
- Country of origin: United Kingdom
- Original language: English
- No. of series: 2
- No. of episodes: 45

Production
- Running time: 30 minutes
- Production company: Hindsight Productions

Original release
- Network: BBC Two
- Release: 17 July 2017 – 8 November 2018

Letterbox is a British game show that aired on BBC Two from 17 July 2017 to 8 November 2018 and is hosted by Mel Giedroyc.

== Transmissions ==
Series	Episodes	Originally released	
Series	Episodes	First released	Last released
1	15	17 July 2017	8 August 2017
2	30	24 September 2018	8 November 2018
