= Signe Toksvig =

Danish writer

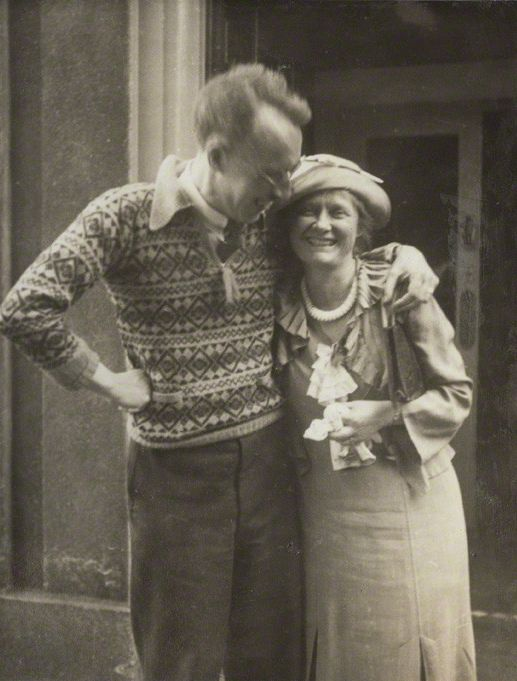
- Toksvig (right) with Frank O'Connor, 1936
- Born: Signe Kirstine Toksvig; 14 February 1891; Nykøbing Sjælland, Denmark
- Died: 15 January 1983 (aged 91)
- Education: Cornell University
- Occupation: Writer
- Spouse: Francis Hackett (m. 1918; died 1962)
- Relatives: Claus Toksvig (nephew); Sandi Toksvig (grand-niece)

Signe Kirstine Toksvig (14 February 1891 – 15 January 1983) was a Danish writer. She contributed to The New York Times, The Nation, The Atlantic, and other periodicals, and also published several books, including biographies of Hans Christian Andersen and Emanuel Swedenborg. Her life and work, and obstacles she encountered, has also been the focus of scholarship by others. She lived parts of her life in the United States and Ireland, and all her writings were in English.

She is the great-aunt of Sandi Toksvig.

== Life ==
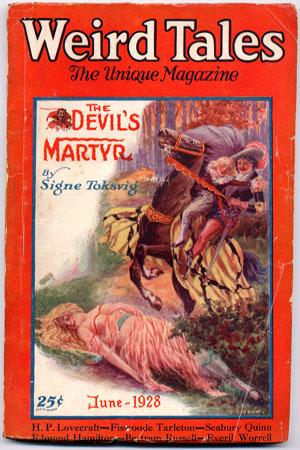
Toksvig's short story "The Devil's Martyr" was cover-featured on the June 1928 Weird Tales

In 1891, Toksvig was born in Nykøbing Sjælland in Denmark. At age 14, Toksvig emigrated with her family from Denmark to the United States.She graduated from Cornell in 1916, and then worked as an assistant editor at The New Republic. In 1918, she married the journal's founder, Francis Hackett, an Irish writer and literary critic. They moved to Ireland in 1926 and lived there until 1937, when they moved to Denmark. They spent the Second World War in the United States, but returned to Europe and Denmark in the 1950s.

During her senior year at Cornell, she was the editor-in-chief (and one of the founders) of the student publication The Cornell Women's Review. She was also a member of Der Hexenkreis, the USA's first honor society founded for women, by women. Der Hexenkreis was founded in 1892 and became coeducational in 1970.

In 1943 she and her husband lived in Newton, Connecticut, and she was awarded a Guggenheim Fellowship for the academic year 1943–1944. The fellowship supported her work on her biography of Emanuel Swedenborg. The goal of the biography was "to interpret the kind of man he was, with some reference to his scientific achievements but with special emphasis on his ideas concerning human survival after death, linked to a comparison of modern ideas on the same subject, and to be written from a nontheological point of view".

== Bibliography ==
=== Novels ===
- Toksvig, Signe (1927). The last devil. New York: John Day.
- Toksvig, Signe (1937). Eve's doctor. New York: Harcourt.
- Toksvig, Signe (1938). Port of refuge. London: Faber and Faber.
- Toksvig, Signe (1941). Life boat. London: Faber and Faber.

=== Biographies ===
- Toksvig, Signe (1933). The life of Hans Christian Andersen. London: Macmillan. LCCN 35035062.
- Toksvig, Signe (1948). Emanuel Swedenborg, Scientist and Mystic . New Haven: Yale University Press. ISBN 0-87785-171-9. LCCN 48006174 – via Wikisource.

=== Articles ===
- Signe Toksvig (September 30, 1945). "Aldous Huxley's prescriptions for spiritual myopia". The New York Times. p. 117.

=== As editor ===
- Andersen, Hans Christian (1921). Signe Toksvig (ed.). Fairy tales and stories. New York: Macmillan.

=== Critical studies, reviews and biography of Toksvig ===
- Toksvig, Signe (1994). Lis Pihl (ed.). Signe Toksvig's Irish diaries, 1926-1937. Dublin: Lilliput Press. ISBN 1-874675-26-0.
- Glasgow, Ellen Anderson Gholson (1958). Letters. Harcourt, Brace.
