= Claus Toksvig =

Danish journalist (1929–1988)

- Born: Claus Bertel Toksvig; 21 October 1929; Copenhagen, Denmark
- Died: 5 November 1988 (aged 59)
- Occupations: Broadcaster, journalist, politician
- Years active: 1951–1988
- Spouse: Julie Anne Toksvig (née Brett)
- Children: 3, including Sandi Toksvig
- Relatives: Signe Toksvig (aunt)

Member of the European Parliament for Denmark
- In office 24 July 1984 – 5 November 1988

Personal details
- Party: DKF (from 1984)

Claus Bertel Toksvig (21 October 1929 – 5 November 1988) was a Danish broadcaster, journalist and politician who, as the Danish Broadcasting Corporation's first permanent foreign correspondent, is widely acknowledged as one of the greatest figures in Danish broadcasting history.

In later life he turned his attention to politics. In 1984, he was elected as a member of the European Parliament and served briefly as one of the European Parliament's fourteen Vice-Presidents.

== Journalism and broadcasting ==
Commencing with five years spent working on the BBC World Service's Danish-language broadcasts, in London, Toksvig held numerous appointments in journalism and broadcasting.

He was part of the original team of reporters on TV Avisen, the first daily evening television news programme broadcast by the Danish Broadcasting Corporation (DR) in 1965; and in 1967 he was posted to New York City as DR's first ever permanent foreign correspondent.

After fifteen years of continuous service as a foreign correspondent, in New York and London; he resigned his position with DR in a dispute over working conditions and their intention to rotate him out of his posting to London, where his family were settled and he had established a permanent home.

As a broadcaster, he is probably most popularly remembered as the man providing the live Danish commentary on the Apollo 11 mission and Neil Armstrong's first Moon walk.

- 1951–1956: Production assistant with the BBC World Service's Danish-language broadcasts, in London.
- 1956–1958: Reporter for the Federal Broadcasting Corporation, in the then Federation of Rhodesia and Nyasaland.
- 1958–1967: Reporter and anchor with the Danish Broadcasting Corporation (DR) news and current affairs programming, in Copenhagen.
- 1967–1974: Posted to New York City as DR's first ever permanent foreign correspondent. – a period during which he is remembered for covering such events as the Apollo 11 mission, the Watergate scandal, the assassinations of Robert F Kennedy and Martin Luther King, as well as notable periods of the Vietnam War.
- 1974–1977: Eurovision Song Contest commentator for DR.
- 1974–1982: London correspondent for DR.
- 1982: Resigned his position with DR.

== Politics ==
In 1984, Claus Toksvig stood as a Conservative People's Party candidate for the European Parliament and was elected as a member of the European Parliament (MEP) by one of the largest popular votes ever achieved by a Danish politician.

He served three successive terms as the Vice-Chairman of the European Democrats (ED) grouping within the parliament, was for a short time one of the fourteen Vice-Presidents of the European Parliament, chaired the EU delegation for relations with Norway and served as a member on the European Parliament's standing committees on: Institutional Affairs; Political Affairs; and Energy, Research and Technology. In 1987 he stood for the chairmanship of the ED group, but was defeated by Christopher Prout.

Claus Toksvig died before the completion of his first term as an MEP.

== Personal life ==
Claus Toksvig was born in Copenhagen in 1929 and was the second child of Harald Toksvig, a well-known editor and illustrator, and Karen Frederikke Clauson-Kaas.

In 1954, whilst working for the BBC World Service in London, Toksvig married Julie Anne Brett and together they had three children: Nick Toksvig (a bureau chief and senior news editor for Al Jazeera English), Sandi Toksvig (a comedian, author and broadcaster) and Jenifer Toksvig (an author, lyricist and playwright).

Toksvig died on 5 November 1988 and was buried at the Nørup cemetery, in the Vejle municipality of Jutland.

== Bibliography ==
- Slutspil i Afrika (English: Endgame in Africa), Claus Toksvig, C. Erichsen 1961, LCCN 64-36119
- TV-reporter (English: TV reporter), Claus Toksvig, C. Erichsen 1963, LCCN 65-46763
- Den redigerede virkelighed – en reporters beretning om det amerikanske praesidentvalg 1972 (English: The edited reality – one reporter's account of the U.S. presidential election 1972), Claus Toksvig, Forum 1972, LCCN 73-344548

== Filmography ==
Claus Toksvig appeared as himself (and as the narrator) in both the English-language and Danish-language versions of the 1961 Danish-American co-production of Reptilicus; which, as the country's first and only giant monster film, has a large cult following in Denmark.
