= Mel & Sue (TV series) =

British television series

- Genre: Chat show
- Presented by: Mel Giedroyc; Sue Perkins
- Country of origin: United Kingdom
- Original language: English
- No. of series: 1
- No. of episodes: 30

Production
- Running time: 60 minutes (inc. adverts)
- Production companies: Princess Pictures and Square Peg TV

Original release
- Network: ITV
- Release: 12 January – 20 February 2015

Mel & Sue is a British chat show presented by Mel Giedroyc and Sue Perkins. The series was broadcast live on ITV between 12 January and 20 February 2015. On 11 August 2015, ITV announced that Mel & Sue had been cancelled after one series.

== Episodes ==
=== Regular episodes ===
#	Date	Guests
1	12 January 2015	Jennifer Saunders and Gareth Malone
2	13 January 2015	Chris Packham, Michaela Strachan and Gemma Arterton
3	14 January 2015	Dermot O'Leary, Pauline Quirke, Lesley Joseph, Linda Robson and Gemma Collins
4	15 January 2015	Warwick Davis and Nick Hewer
5	16 January 2015	Jo Brand and Christian Jessen
6	19 January 2015	Michael Palin and Bridget Christie
7	20 January 2015	Julie Hesmondhalgh and Sara Cox
8	21 January 2015^{1}	Margaret Mountford and Marcus Brigstocke
9	22 January 2015^{1}	Yvette Fielding, Jack Whitehall and Michael Whitehall
10	23 January 2015	Robert Webb, Kara Tointon, Vincent Simone and Flavia Cacace
11	26 January 2015	Steve Backshall and Hugh Dennis
12	27 January 2015	Davina McCall and John Humphrys
13	28 January 2015	Jason Manford and Alexandra Burke
14	29 January 2015	Brenda Blethyn and Sally Lindsay
15	30 January 2015	Stephen Mangan, Jessica Hynes and Rumer
16	2 February 2015	Robert Rinder and Emilia Fox
17	3 February 2015	John Craven and Lorraine Kelly
18	4 February 2015	Ben Miller and Sara Pascoe
19	5 February 2015	Alison Steadman and Kirsty Young
20	6 February 2015	Arlene Phillips and Katherine Grainger
21	9 February 2015	Melanie C and Ross Noble
22	10 February 2015	Mary Berry and Paul Hollywood
23	11 February 2015	Michael Ball and Jenny Eclair
24	12 February 2015	Sarah Beeny and Les Dennis
25	13 February 2015	Louie Spence and Liza Tarbuck
26	16 February 2015	Terry Wogan, Cheryl Baker, Mike Nolan and Jay Aston
27	17 February 2015	Vernon Kay and David Essex
28	18 February 2015	Rufus Hound, Roger Moore and The Vamps
29	19 February 2015	Alan Davies and Ken Hom
30	20 February 2015	Ruby Wax, Dan Snow and The Overtones

=== Compilations ===
#	Date	Guests
1	1 February 2015	Hugh Dennis, Jason Manford, Davina McCall, John Humphrys, Stephen Mangan, Brenda Blethyn, Sally Lindsay and Jessica Hynes
2	8 February 2015	
3	15 February 2015	
4	22 February 2015	

^1 Giedroyc presented the episode alone as Perkins was absent due to illness. This happened in episodes 8 and 9.

== Reception ==
The show received mixed reviews from critics, with the Telegraph commenting that the show had had "teething troubles", stating that technical glitches and badly angled cameras affected the show's professionalism. The Telegraph only gave the show 2/5 stars, but stated that it had room for improvement, and did praise the hosts for their "genuine friendship and natural rapport on-screen".
