= Mel Giedroyc =

British actress and comedian (born 1968)

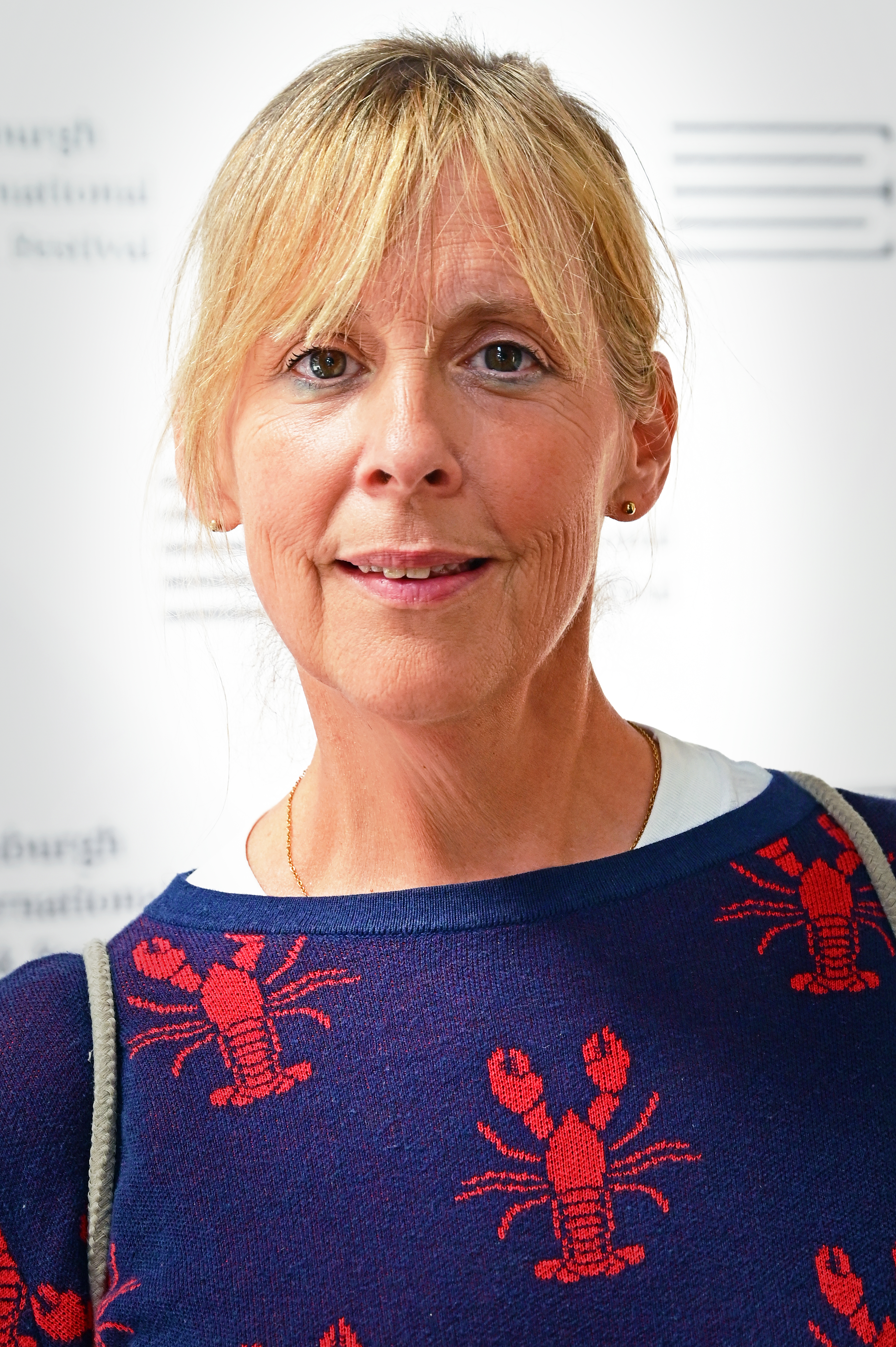
- Giedroyc in 2026
- Born: Melanie Clare Sophie Giedroyc; 5 June 1968 (age 58); Epsom, Surrey, England
- Education: Trinity College, Cambridge (BA)
- Years active: 1993–present
- Television: Light Lunch; The Great British Bake Off; Draw It!; Now You See It; Mel and Sue; Let It Shine; Let's Sing and Dance for Comic Relief; Eurovision: You Decide; Pitch Battle; Letterbox; The Generation Game; Richard Hammond's 5 O'Clock Show; Handmade: Britain's Best Woodworker; Mel Giedroyc: Unforgivable
- Spouse: Ben Morris (m. 2002)
- Children: 2
- Father: Michal Giedroyc
- Relatives: Coky Giedroyc (sister); Philip Parham (brother-in-law)

Melanie Clare Sophie Giedroyc (/ˈɡɛdrɔɪtʃ/ GHED-roytch, Polish pronunciation: [ˈɡʲɛdrɔjt͡ɕ]; born 5 June 1968) is an English comedian, television presenter and actress.

With Sue Perkins, she has co-hosted series including Light Lunch for Channel 4, The Great British Bake Off for the BBC, and chat show Mel and Sue for ITV. Since 2015, she has held a number of commentating roles for the Eurovision Song Contest. In early 2017, Giedroyc co-presented the BBC show Let It Shine.

== Early life and education ==
Giedroyc was born on 5 June 1968 in Epsom, Surrey, and grew up in Leatherhead. Her father, Michal, an aircraft designer, civil engineer and family historian, of Polish–Lithuanian descent from the aristocratic Giedroyć family, had moved to Britain in 1947; he died in December 2017.

Her English mother, Rosemary "Rosy" Cumpston (1937–2024), trained as a nurse from age 17, and was a heavy smoker until she suffered a stroke in later life and was confined to a nursing home, where she died. Mel's older sister is film and television director Coky Giedroyc. After moving to Oxford as a teenager, Giedroyc was privately educated at Oxford High School and later the University of Cambridge as a student of Trinity College, Cambridge, where she graduated with a lower second class degree in French and Italian, she has subsequently expressed regret at not working harder and attending more of her lectures.

== Career ==
=== Television ===
Giedroyc met Sue Perkins while they were students at the University of Cambridge and members of the Footlights comedy club. Mel and Sue were short-listed for the Daily Express Best Newcomers Award at the Edinburgh Festival in 1993. Their first presenting roles saw them host a lunchtime show on Channel 4 called Light Lunch (and the early evening version, Late Lunch). In 1996, she appeared with Perkins in four episodes of the BBC One sketch comedy series French and Saunders.

In 1999, Giedroyc appeared with Perkins in one episode of Gimme Gimme Gimme, playing a receptionist at a hotel. She was also a presenter on Channel 4's RI:SE. She narrated Celebrity Driving School in 2003. Some other ventures include being a contestant on the 2005 series of The Games, co-starring in the 2005 BBC One sitcom Blessed and co-presenting Richard Hammond's 5 O'Clock Show on ITV. Giedroyc was in one episode of The Vicar of Dibley.

Giedroyc was the sixth student to be voted out of Comic Relief Does Fame Academy and was a celebrity judge on the 2007 edition of Making Your Mind Up along with John Barrowman. She starred as one of the presenters in the show Eurobeat: Almost Eurovision! at the Edinburgh Fringe and subsequently in the West End at the Novello Theatre. Giedroyc played the Fairy Liquid in a production of Jack and the Beanstalk at London's Barbican theatre in December 2007. She appeared in a children's sketch show for the BBC Sorry, I've Got No Head. In 2010, Giedroyc was a celebrity guest team captain on What Do Kids Know? with Rufus Hound, Joe Swash and Sara Cox on Watch and also appeared in the first episode of series two of Miranda Hart's self-titled sitcom Miranda as a life coach.

Giedroyc was a panellist on the Channel 5 programme The Wright Stuff in 2007, 2008 and in February 2010. She plays Mrs V, the owner of the Y café, in CBBC programme Sadie J and is also the voice of Mist in Mist: Sheepdog Tales, shown on Channel 5's morning show Milkshake!.

Giedroyc was reunited with Sue Perkins in 2010 to host the cookery competition The Great British Bake Off, on BBC Two from 16 August 2010. Later, in an apparently syndicated newspaper interview, Giedroyc admitted that she did the show just for the money, informing readers that she had nearly gone bankrupt. The show moved to BBC One for its fifth series and has won numerous awards.

In 2012 and 2013, Giedroyc hosted two special charity series for Sport Relief and Comic Relief featuring celebrities who took part for charity. In 2014, she guest hosted an episode of The Great Sport Relief Bake Off and in 2015, one episode of The Great Comic Relief Bake Off.

In March 2014, Giedroyc presented Collectaholics, a factual mini-series for BBC Two.

From May 2014, Giedroyc presented one series of the Channel 4 programme Draw It!, based upon and developed by the makers of the mobile app Draw Something.

In May 2014, Giedroyc and clinical psychologist Dr Jennifer Wild presented a one-off show for BBC One called Vertigo Road Trip about people who have a fear of heights. Reviewing the programme, in The Psychologist, Petrina Cox described it as "an engaging and valuable education for the general public about the nature of anxiety disorders such as specific phobias. It is sure to reduce stigma, inspire hope and encourage people to seek evidence-based treatments... "

On 12 November 2014, Giedroyc guest hosted an episode of The One Show with Alex Jones.

In 2015, Giedroyc narrated eight-part BBC One series Now You See It. A second series aired in 2016.

In January 2015, Giedroyc and Perkins were given their own daytime chat show on ITV. The show, called Mel and Sue aired for 30 episodes, every weekday at 4pm. In August 2015, it was announced that Mel and Sue had not been re-commissioned.

Giedroyc and Matt Baker began co-hosting four-part BBC One series The Gift in February 2015. The Gift returned for a second series in 2017.

Giedroyc hosted the Sky1 primetime game show Relatively Clever, which began on 3 April 2015.

In May 2015, Giedroyc joined Scott Mills in commentating the semi-finals of the Eurovision Song Contest 2015 for the United Kingdom. It was broadcast on BBC Three.

In December 2015, Giedroyc performed as Frau Schmidt in The Sound of Music Live (2015) which was broadcast on ITV.

In 2016, she presented the first episode of The Great Sport Relief Bake Off.

Since 2016, Giedroyc has presented the Eurovision You Decide programme.

In September 2016, Love Productions announced that a three-year deal had been agreed to broadcast The Great British Bake Off on Channel 4, instead of the BBC, from 2017. Giedroyc and Perkins announced that they would not be continuing with the show on its new network. Mary Berry later announced she was also leaving Bake Off on the same day that fellow judge Paul Hollywood separately announced he would be staying with the show.

In 2017, Giedroyc co-presented the Saturday night BBC show Let It Shine – including three live shows – alongside Graham Norton. The judges were Gary Barlow, Martin Kemp and Dannii Minogue.

She narrated The Secret Chef for ITV and co-presented Let's Sing and Dance for Comic Relief alongside Sue Perkins on BBC One.

Also in 2017, Giedroyc competed in the fourth series of Taskmaster against Lolly Adefope, Hugh Dennis, Noel Fielding and Joe Lycett. Since June 2017, Giedroyc has presented Saturday night entertainment series Pitch Battle for BBC One. She also presents the daily BBC Two game show Letterbox, having hosted 45 episodes (15 for series one, 30 for series two) since 2017. On 23 July 2017, it was confirmed that Giedroyc and Perkins would host a new version of The Generation Game for BBC One.

In November 2017, she co-presented Children in Need for the first time. In December 2017, she hosted an episode of Have I Got News for You and was host again in 2022 and 2024.

In May 2018, Giedroyc was the spokesperson for the United Kingdom as part of the Eurovision Song Contest 2018.

Mel Giedroyc: Unforgivable began airing on Dave in February 2021. It invites three celebrity guests along to Mel's confessional each week to find out who's committed sins that are so bad that they should be declared 'unforgivable'.

On 13 May 2023, Giedroyc was UK co-commentator at the Eurovision Song Contest final, alongside Graham Norton. In a reference to the 2014 Polish Eurovision entry "My Słowianie" and to Giedroyc's own Polish heritage, she appeared as a Polish milkmaid, suggestively churning butter behind host Hannah Waddingham, as Waddingham introduced Armenia's performance after the intermission.

In late 2024, Giedroyc became the host of the British version of the Mattel-produced American game show Pictionary. The broadcast started on 23 December 2024 on ITV with Christmas specials and was followed by the regular series in early 2025.

In 2025, Giedroyc participated in the sixth series of The Masked Singer as "Teeth". She was eliminated in the fifth episode.

In August 2025, Giedroyc was announced as a contestant on the upcoming second series of LOL: Last One Laughing UK, set to air in 2026.

=== Radio ===
Giedroyc appeared in the 1994 Radio 4 comedy series The Skivers with Nick Golson and Tim de Jongh. In July 2000, Giedroyc appeared as a contestant on The 99p Challenge, a radio show hosted by Sue Perkins. In August 2010, Giedroyc appeared on the Dave Gorman show on Absolute Radio as one of his co-hosts, standing in for Danielle Ward, and has also appeared on series 4 to 7 of Count Arthur Strong's Radio Show! on BBC Radio 4. From 2 April 2011, with the rebranding of Radio 7 as Radio 4 extra, Giedroyc presented The 4 O'Clock Show, a magazine show including items designed to entertain and inform children.

On 6 September 2014, Giedroyc co-hosted with Lee Mack on his BBC Radio 2 Saturday morning show.

From 16 April 2016, she started presenting a Saturday lunchtime show on Magic Radio from 1 pm until 3 pm.

On 13 November 2024, it was announced that Giedroyc would start presenting a request show on Magic Radio on Sunday mornings from January 2025. In 2025, Giedroyc presented The Magic Request Show.

=== Podcasting ===
In 2025, Giedroyc launched a podcast Mel and Sue Should Know by Now on Audible with Perkins. Also in 2025, she took over from Kathy Burke as host of Where There's a Will There's a Wake.

=== Other work ===
In November 2014, Giedroyc was a part of Gareth Malone's All Star Choir, singing the opening solo in the choir's cover version of "Wake Me Up" to raise money for the BBC's Children in Need. On 3 and 10 November 2014, a two-part documentary about the choir was broadcast by BBC One. On 16 November, the single entered the UK Singles Chart at Number One.

Giedroyc appeared in The Rocky Horror Show Live which was simulcast live to cinemas across the United Kingdom and Europe from London's Playhouse Theatre on 17 September 2015 in the role of Third Narrator.

Giedroyc presented the Strictly Come Dancing Live Tour from 22 January until 14 February 2016.

Giedroyc appeared in the 2018 West End Revival of the Stephen Sondheim musical Company, playing the role of Sarah.

Giedroyc played Beatrice in the 2018 Rose Theatre production of Shakespeare's Much Ado About Nothing.

On 23 November 2021, it was announced that Giedroyc would dance with Neil Jones in the 2021 Strictly Come Dancing Christmas Special.

Giedroyc played the parts of Mrs Edwards (wife of the custodian of the Crown Jewels) and of a 'Lady of the Bedchamber' to King Charles II, in The Crown Jewels, a play written by screenwriter Simon Nye and performed at the Garrick Theatre in London in 2023, about Colonel Blood's theft of the jewels in 1671. The part of Blood was played by Aidan McArdle, Al Murray played the king, and the cast also included Neil Morrissey.

In February 2024, Giedroyc played the part of Irene, Brian's mum in the world premiere of the musical Starter for Ten, based on the novel and film at the Bristol Old Vic. She reprised the role in the September 2025 revival in Bristol before transferring to the Birmingham Rep.

== Personal life ==
Giedroyc is the youngest of four children. Her sister Coky Giedroyc is a film and television director; while her other sister, Kasia, a children's writer, is married to Philip Parham, a British diplomat.

Giedroyc is married to Ben Morris, a television director and teacher at LAMDA. They have two daughters.

In 2021, Giedroyc spoke publicly about her age, saying, "I've noticed of late, the old hormonal journey is quite interesting. The old peri-menopausal express has come to town! I'm not in the full hot flush yet, but I very much feel it's coming. I've noticed mood-wise, it gets quite interesting."

== Filmography ==
Year	Title	Role	Channel	Notes
1996	French and Saunders	Various characters	BBC One	4 episodes; with Sue Perkins; Also credited for additional material
1996	The Vicar of Dibley	Mary Tinker	BBC One	1 episode
1997–98	Light Lunch	Co-presenter	Channel 4	With Sue Perkins
1998–99	Late Lunch	Co-presenter	Channel 4	With Sue Perkins
1999	Gimme Gimme Gimme	Beverly-Jane	BBC2	Series 1 episode 5: "Saturday Night Diva"
2005	Blessed	Sue Chandler	BBC One	
2006	Mist: The Tale of a Sheepdog Puppy	Voice of Mist	Channel 5	One-off TV film
2006	Richard Hammond's 5 O'Clock Show	Co-presenter	ITV	1 series; with Richard Hammond
2008–11	Sorry, I've Got No Head	Various characters	CBBC	
2010	Miranda	Life coach	BBC Two	1 episode
2010–16	The Great British Bake Off	Co-presenter	BBC Two (2010–13); BBC One (2014–16)	7 series; with Sue Perkins
2011–14	Sadie J	Ms. V	CBBC	
2013, 2016, 2017, 2022, 2023	Have I Got News for You	Guest presenter	BBC One	5 episodes
2014	Draw It!	Presenter	Channel 4	1 series
2014	Collectaholics	Presenter	BBC Two	1 series
2014	Vertigo Road Trip	Presenter	BBC One	One-off show
2015–16	Now You See It	Narrator	BBC One	2 series
2015	The Gift	Co-presenter	BBC One	1 series; with Matt Baker
2015	Mel and Sue	Co-presenter	ITV	1 series; with Sue Perkins
2015	Relatively Clever	Presenter	Sky1	1 series
2015	Eurovision Song Contest 2015	Co-commentator	BBC Three	Semi-finals; with Scott Mills
2015	The Sound of Music Live	Frau Schmidt	ITV	One-off special
2016–19	Eurovision: You Decide	Presenter	BBC Four (2016); BBC Two (2017—19)	With Måns Zelmerlöw (2018–19)
2016	Eurovision Song Contest 2016	Co-commentator	BBC Four	Semi-finals; with Scott Mills
2016	Horrible Histories	Various	CBBC	2 episodes
2017	Let It Shine	Co-presenter	BBC One	1 series; with Graham Norton
2017	The Secret Chef	Narrator	ITV	1 series
2017	Let's Sing and Dance for Comic Relief	Co-presenter	BBC One	1 series; with Sue Perkins
2017	Taskmaster	Herself	Dave	Series 4
2017	Eurovision Song Contest 2017	Co-commentator	BBC Four	Semi-finals; with Scott Mills
2017	Pitch Battle	Presenter	BBC One	1 series
2017	Mary, Mel and Sue's Big Christmas Thank You	One-off special	BBC One	1 series
2017–18	Letterbox	Presenter	BBC Two	2 series
2017–26	Children in Need	Co-presenter	BBC One	with Graham Norton and Ade Adepitan
2018	The Generation Game	Co-presenter	BBC One	1 series; with Sue Perkins
2018	Eurovision Song Contest 2018	UK spokesperson	BBC One, EBU	
2020–	Hitmen	Co-Star	Sky1	2 series; with Sue Perkins
2021–24	Mel Giedroyc: Unforgivable	Presenter	Dave	3 series
2021	Strictly Come Dancing Christmas Special	Contestant	BBC One	With professional dance partner Neil Jones
2021–22	One Night In...	Narrator	Channel 4	4 episodes
2021–22	Handmade: Britain's Best Woodworker	Presenter	Channel 4	2 series; (2021) (2022)
2022	The Really Really Rude Puppet Show (w/t)	Host	Channel 4	6 episodes
2023	Eurovision Song Contest 2023	Co-commentator	BBC One	Final; with Graham Norton
2023	Mary Makes It Easy	Guest	BBC Two	With host Mary Berry
2024	90 Day Fiancé UK Tell All	Host	Discovery+	
2024–2025	Pictionary	Host	ITV1	Quiz show
2025	The Masked Singer	Teeth	ITV1	Contestant: Series 6
2025	Win Win	Co-host	ITV1	Game show; with Sue Perkins
2025	Midsomer Murders	Estelle Hallis	ITV	Episode: "Top of the Class"
2026	LOL: Last One Laughing UK	Contestant	Amazon Prime Video	Series 2
2026	The Way Out	Presenter	U and U&Dave	Upcoming series

== Books ==
- 2005, From Here to Maternity: One Mother of a Journey, Ebury Press, ISBN 978-0091897505 – diary based on her first pregnancy.
- 2007, Going Ga-Ga: Is there life after birth?, Ebury Press, ISBN 978-0-09-190592-7 – similar theme.
- 2021, The Best Things, Headline Review ISBN 978-1472256218 – debut novel
- 2026, The Comeback, Headline ISBN 978-1-4722-5626-3 - second novel
