= Frank (given name) =

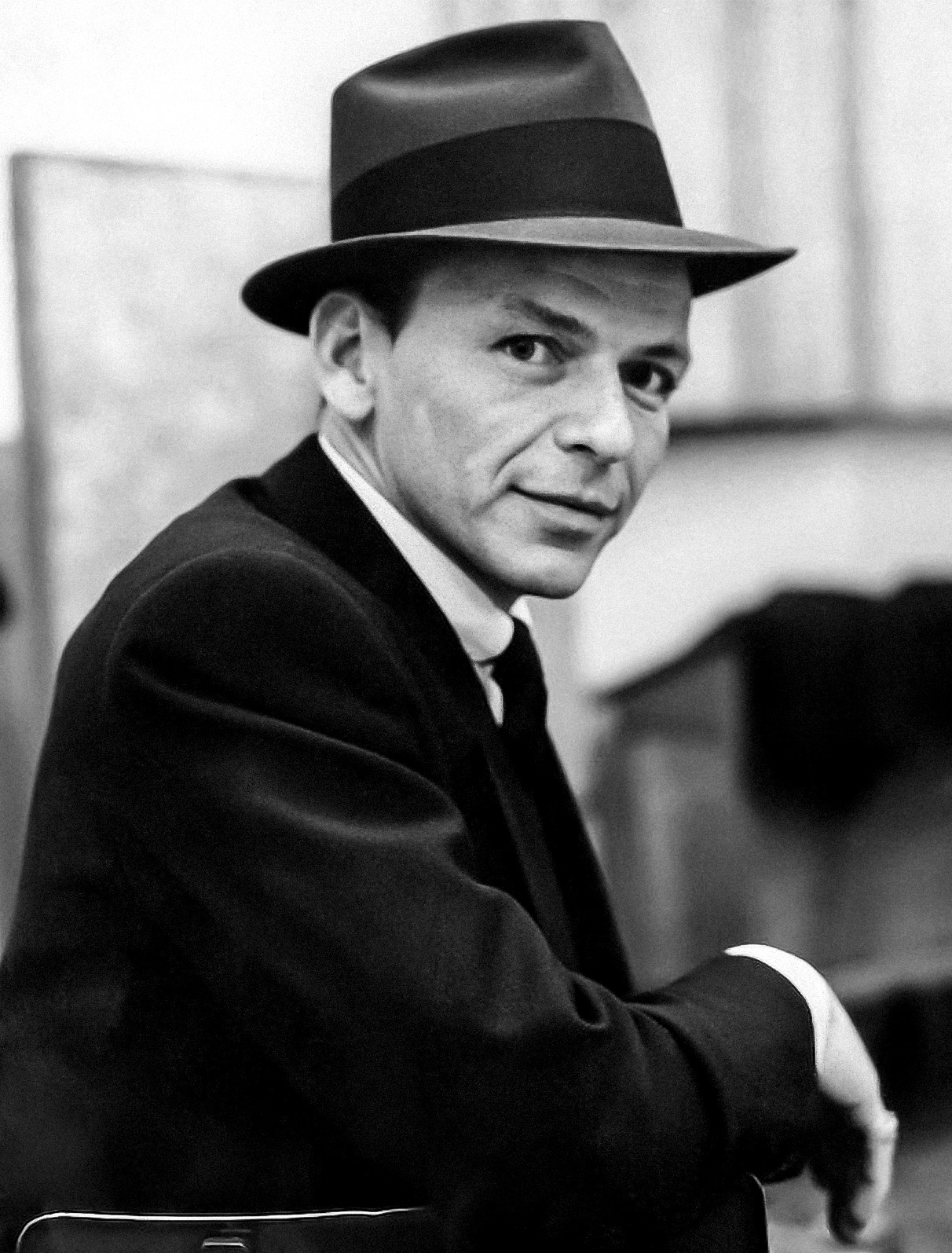
- Frank Sinatra in 1957
- Pronunciation: /ˈfræŋk/
- Gender: Male

Origin
- Language: Old High German
- Meaning: from the name of the Franks

Other names
- Related names: Francis, François, Francesco, Francisco, Francisc, Franciszek, Ferenc, Franklin, Franco, Frankie, Franjo, Frans, Franz, František, Franchesca

Frank /fræŋk/ is a masculine given name.

While Frank has been a European name in its own right, the given name in the English-speaking United States arose in the 20th century as a short form of the traditional common English variant Francis (which itself is a shortening of Franciscus, i.e. "the Frenchman", in reference to Saint Francis of Assisi). It was popularized particularly by Frank Sinatra (born Francis Albert Sinatra, 1915–1998).

The continental variant of Frank dates back to the Carolingian period in France and Germany (the early medieval Frankish Empire where originally Old Frankish was spoken by the elite). The Old High German form Francho, Franko is on record from the 8th century. Hence also the English adjective frank (Middle English, from Old French franc, 12th century).

== People with the given name ==
=== In architecture ===
- Frank Miles Day (1861–1918), American architect
- Frank Furness (1839–1912), American architect
- Frank Gehry (1929–2025), Canadian-American architect and designer
- Frank Lloyd Wright (1867–1959), American architect, designer, writer, and educator

=== In the arts ===
- Frank Björklund (born 1960), Swedish surrealist painter and printmaker
- Frank Frazetta (1928–2010), American fantasy and science fiction artist
- Frank Hunter (photographer) (born 1947), American photographer
- Frank Lynn Jenkins (1870–1927), British sculptor
- Frank Jump (born 1960), American urban photographer and author
- Frank Marshall (photographer) (born 1985), South African photographer
- Frank Miles (1852–1891), British artist
- Frank Moher (born 1955), Canadian playwright
- Frank O'Hara (1926–1966), American writer, poet, and art critic
- Frank Stella (1936–2024), American painter and printmaker
- Frank Thomas (animator) (1912–2004), one of Walt Disney's team of animators known as the Nine Old Men

==== In comics ====
- Frank Bellamy (1917–1976), British comics artist
- Frank Brunner (born 1949), American comics artist
- Frank Cirocco (born 1956), American comics artist
- Frank Giacoia (1924–1988), American comics artist
- Frank Le Gall (born 1959), French comics author
- Frank Madsen (born 1962), Danish comics artist
- Frank Margerin (born 1952), French comics author
- Frank Miller (born 1957), American comics author
- Frank Pé (1956–2025), Belgian comics author
- Frank Springer (1929–2009), American comics artist
- Frank Thomas (comics) (1914–1968), American cartoonist; creator of The Eye
- Frank Tieri, American comics writer

==== In film and television ====
- Frank Bank (1942–2013), American actor
- Frank Borzage (1894–1962), American film director and actor
- Frank Caliendo (born 1974), American comedy actor, impressionist and comedian, host of the television show Frank TV
- Frank Capra (1897–1991), American film director
- Frank Delfino (1911–1997), American actor
- Frank Elstner (born 1942), German television presenter
- Franky G (born 1965), American film and television actor
- Frank Gorshin (1933–2005), American actor and comedian from Pittsburgh, Pennsylvania
- Frank Ketelaar (born 1960), Dutch screenwriter and director
- Frank Langella (born 1938), American actor
- Frank Marshall (producer) (born 1946) American film producer
- Frank Morgan (1890–1949), American character actor
- Frank Muller (1951–2008), Dutch audio book narrator and actor
- Frank Oz (born 1944), American actor and puppeteer
- Frank Skinner (born 1957), British comedian
- Frank Somerville (born 1958), American news anchor
- Frank M. Thomas (1889–1989), American actor
- Frank Twomey (1950s–2023), the man from Irish children's television programme Bosco
- Frank Vincent (1937–2017), American actor
- Frank Welker (born 1946), American voice actor
- Frank Whaley (born 1963), American actor

==== In literature ====
- Frank Bettger (1888–1981), American self-help book author
- Frank Chin (born 1940), Chinese-American author
- Frank Conniff (born 1958), American actor and writer who portrayed TV's Frank
- Frank Harris (1885–1931), Irish American journalist and autobiographer
- Frank Herbert (1920–1986), American science fiction writer, author of the Dune series
- Frank Lebby Stanton (1857–1927), American lyricist
- Frank McCourt (1930–2009), Irish-American writer

==== In music ====
- Frank Beard (musician) (born 1949), drummer for ZZ Top
- Frank Bello (born 1965), American bassist of thrash metal band Anthrax
- Frank Michael Beyer (1928–2008), German composer
- Frank Black (born 1965), American musician
- Frank Bridge (1879–1941), English composer
- Frank Corcoran (born 1944), Irish composer
- Frank C. Stanley (1868–1910), American singer
- Frank Farian (1941–2024), German songwriter and producer
- Frank Carlton Serafino Feranna Jr. (born 1958), American musician, aka Nikki Sixx
- Frank Ferko (born 1950), American composer
- Frank Gambale (born 1958), Australian jazz fusion guitarist
- Frank Iero (born 1981), rhythm guitarist for the band My Chemical Romance and lead singer for the band Leathermouth
- Frank Klepacki (born 1974), American video game music composer
- Frank La Rocca (born 1951), American composer
- Frank Lewin (1925–2008), American composer
- Frank Loesser (1910–1969), American songwriter
- Frank Marino (born 1954), Canadian guitarist and hard rock band leader
- Frank Marshall (pianist) (1883–1959), Spanish pianist and pedagogue
- Frank Martin (1890–1974), Swiss composer
- Frank Mullen (born 1970), former vocalist for the band Suffocation
- Frank Ocean (born 1987), American musician
- Frank Proto (born 1941), American composer and bassist
- Frank Ricotti (born 1949), English jazz vibraphonist and percussionist
- Frank Sinatra (1915–1998), American singer and actor
- Frank Slay (1930–2017), American songwriter, record producer
- Frank Ticheli (born 1958), American composer
- Frank Turner (born 1981), British folk/punk singer songwriter
- Frank Edwin Wright III (known as Tré Cool, born 1972), drummer of the band Green Day
- Frank Zander (born 1942), German singer and actor
- Frank Zappa (1940–1993), American musician and composer

==== In radio ====
- Frank Sontag (born 1955), talk radio host

=== Criminals ===
- Frank Abagnale (born 1948), former confidence trickster, impostor and escape artist
- Frank Amato (1942–1980), Sicilian-American mafioso
- Frank Bossard (1912–2001), Secret Intelligence Service agent convicted of spying for the USSR
- Frank Cali (1965–2019), American crime boss
- Frank Caracci, American mobster from New Orleans, Louisiana
- Frank Chavez (Teamsters), Teamsters union official and close ally of Jimmy Hoffa
- Frank DeSimone (1909–1967), Italian American mobster
- Frank James (1843–1915), 19th-century outlaw and member of the James-Younger Gang
- Frank Nitti, Italian-American organized crime figure based in Chicago
- Frank Schweihs, gangster who worked for the Chicago Outfit
- Frank Sheeran, American labor union official and enforcer for Jimmy Hoffa and Russell Bufalino
- Frank Spisak (1951–2011), American neo-Nazi serial killer
- Frank Vitkovic, murderer in the Queen Street massacre in Melbourne in 1987

=== In politics and government ===
- Frank Aranow (1883–1971), Belarusian-American lawyer and politician
- Frank Bainimarama (born 1954), commander of the Fijian Military Forces, former prime minister
- Frank Barnett (1933–2016), 49th Governor of American Samoa
- Frank Baude (1936–2021), Swedish politician
- Frank Biegelmeier (1901–1988), chief justice of the South Dakota Supreme Court
- Frank Byron, American politician
- Frank T. Caprio (born 1966), American politician
- Frank Arthur Cooper (1872–1949), Australian politician
- Frank Dobson (1940–2019), British politician
- Frank Field (1942–2024), British politician
- Frank B. Goudy (1882–1944), associate justice of the Colorado Supreme Court
- Frank Heffron (1936–2023), American politician
- Frank Hollingsworth (1892–1964), justice of the Supreme Court of Missouri
- Frank E. Kane (born 1932), Canadian politician
- Frank Kostron (1916–1987), American politician from Missouri
- Frank Lively (1864–1947), justice of the Supreme Court of Appeals of West Virginia
- Frank Marshall, Baron Marshall of Leeds (1915–1990), British lawyer and politician
- Frank Mockler (1909–1993), 47th Governor of American Samoa
- Frank Oberle Jr. (born 1957), Canadian politician
- Frank Oberle Sr. (1932–2024), Canadian politician
- Frank Rijkaart (born 1978), Dutch politician
- Frank Senger (born 1986), German politician
- Frank Valeriote (born 1954), Canadian politician
- Frank van Kappen (born 1941), Dutch soldier and politician
- Frank Wassenberg (born 1966), Dutch politician
- Frank Elbridge Webb (1869–1949), American engineer and presidential candidate in 1928 and 1932
- Frank E. Wheelock (1863–1932), a founder and first mayor of Lubbock, Texas
- Frank Wolf (born 1939), American politician

=== In science and technology ===
- Frank Adams (1930–1989), British mathematician
- Frank Borman (1928–2023), former NASA astronaut (Gemini 7, Apollo 8)
- Frank C. Calkins (1878–1974), American geologist
- Frank Hastings Griffin (1886–1975), American chemist who invented Rayon
- Frank Heart (1929–2018), American computer engineer and Internet pioneer
- Frank J. Low (1933–2009), American physicist
- Frank Talbot (1930–2024), South-African born Australian ichthyologist; former director of the Australian Museum
- Frank T. M. White (1909–1971), Australian mining and metallurgical engineer and mineral science educator

=== In sports ===
- Frank Abercrombie (1850–1939), American baseball player
- Frank Abruzzino (1908–1986), American football player
- Frank Albrechtsen (1932–2021), New Zealand association football player
- Frank Bahret (1858–1888), American baseball player
- Frank Bartley (born 1994), American basketball player for Ironi Ness Ziona of the Israeli Basketball Premier League
- Frank Beltre (born 1990), American football player
- Frank Broers (born 1977), Dutch football player
- Frank Bruno (born 1961), British WBC heavyweight boxing champion
- Frank Burnett (1931–2020), American racing driver
- Frank Buttery (1851–1902), American baseball player
- Frank Bykowski (1915–1985), American football player
- Frank Crum (born 2000), American football player
- Frank Danley (1921–1965), American racing driver
- Frank Darby (born 1997), American football player
- Frank Dehne (born 1976), German volleyball player
- Frank Del Duca (born 1991), American bobsledder
- Frank Dueckerhoff (born 1962), German ice hockey defenceman
- Frank Fleet (1848–1900), American baseball player
- Frank Francisco (born 1979), Dominican baseball player
- Frank Gifford (1930–2015), American football player
- Frank Ginda (born 1997), American football player
- Frank Giorgi (born 1981), Australian kickboxer
- Frank Greenleaf (1877–1953), Canadian sports administrator
- Frank Grillaert (1946–2023), Belgian long-distance runner
- Frank Hassell (born 1988), American basketball player
- Frank Henry (cricketer) (dates unknown), English cricketer
- Frank Herron (born 1994), American football player
- Frank Hood (1908–1955), American football player
- Frank Howard (1936–2023), American baseball player
- Frank Jacobsson (1930–2017), Swedish football player
- Frank James (racing driver) (born 1938), American racing driver
- Frank Kaminsky (born 1993), American basketball player
- Frank Kooiman (born 1970), Dutch football player
- Frank Lampard (born 1978), English football player
- Frank Leatherwood (born 1977), American football player
- Frank Simmons Leavitt (1891–1953), professional wrestler, stuntman, and actor, known by his ring name Man Mountain Dean
- Frank Liivak (born 1996), Estonian football player
- Frank Mahoney (1901–1961), American football player
- Frank Manumaleuga (1956–2022), American football player
- Frank Marshall (footballer, born 1904) (1904–1928), Scottish association football player
- Frank Marshall (footballer, born 1929) (1929–2015), English association football player and coach
- Frank Marshall (umpire) (1858–1???), American professional baseball umpire
- Frank Marshall (referee) (1845–1906), British rugby administrator
- Frank Matteo (1896–1983), American football player
- Frank McConnell (1887–1933), Canadian athlete
- Frank McPhee (American football) (1931–2011), American football player
- Frank Mill (1958–2025), German football player
- Frank Minini (1921–2005), American football player
- Frank Mir (born 1979), American mixed martial artist
- Frank Moreno (born 1965), Cuban judoka
- Frank Mozzicato (born 2003), American baseball player
- Frank Müller (born 1968), German decathlete
- Frank Mundy (1918–2009), former NASCAR Cup Series driver
- Frank Nasworthy, American surfing and skateboarding enthusiast, introduced the urethane skateboard wheel and founded Cadillac Wheels Company
- Frank Ofori (born 1971), Ghanaian tennis player
- Frank Patrick (running back) (1915–1992), American football player
- Frank Patrick (quarterback) (born 1947), American football player
- Frank Patrick (ice hockey) (1885–1960), Canadian ice hockey player
- Frank-Paul Nu'uausala (born 1987), New Zealand Rugby League player
- Frank Pritchard (born 1983), Australian-New Zealand Rugby League player
- Frank Ragnow (born 1996), American football player
- Frank Reich (born 1961), American football player and coach
- Frank Rijkaard (born 1962), Dutch football player and manager
- Frank Roberts (boxer) (1945–2011), one of the first three Indigenous Australian athletes to participate in the Olympic Games, in Tokyo 1964
- Frank Robinson (1935–2019), Hall of Fame North American baseball player and manager
- Frank Sandercock (1887–1942), Canadian ice hockey administrator
- Frank Sargent (sports executive) (1902–1988), Canadian sports executive in ice hockey and curling
- Frank Sinclair (born 1971), English-born Jamaican football player
- Frank Spellacy (1901–1960), American football player
- Frank Spellman (1922–2017), American Olympic champion weightlifter
- Frank Tanana (born 1953), American baseball pitcher
- Frank Thomas (American football) (1898–1954)
- Frank Thomas (born 1968), Major League Baseball player in the American League from 1990 to 2008
- Frank Thomas (outfielder), (1929–2023) Major League Baseball player in the National League from 1951 to 1966
- Frank Trigilio (1919–1992), American football player
- Frank van Hattum (born 1958), New Zealand association football player
- Frank Vogel (born 1973), American basketball coach
- Frank Williams (Formula One) (1942–2021), British racing car driver and founder of the Williams Formula One team

=== Others ===
- Frank Buchman (1878–1961), American evangelist
- Frank Buckles (1901–2011), United States Army corporal and the last surviving American military veteran of World War I
- Frank Caprio (1936–2025), American jurist
- Frank Cooper III, business executive, branded entertainment leader
- Frank de Silva (born 1935), Inspector-General of Sri Lanka Police from 1993–1995
- Frank Di Mauro (born 1973), co-founder of Bookitbee
- Frank Marcus Fernando (1931–2009), 3rd Bishop of the Roman Catholic Diocese of Chilaw
- Frank Fitzsimmons, American labor leader
- Frank Graves (born 1952), Canadian pollster
- Frank Grevil (born 1960), Danish whistleblower
- Frank Avery Hutchins (1851–1914), American educator and librarian
- Frank Ebenezer Hill (1880–1932), American Medal of Honor recipient
- Frank K. Houston (1881–1973), president and chairman of the Chemical Corn Exchange Bank in the 1940s
- Frank Ilett (born 1996), British social media influencer
- Frank Jenner (1903–1977), English Australian evangelist
- Frank Larkin (1972–2020), Irish disability rights activist
- Frank Charles Laubach (1884–1970), Congregational Christian missionary and mystic
- Frank Laukien (born 1960), American billionaire businessman
- Franz Lenck (died 1931), German murder victim
- Frank Lowy (born 1930), Australian businessman
- Frank Marshall (chess player) (1877–1944), American chess master
- Frank Marshall (priest) (1945–2017), Dean of Barbados
- Frank Pearson (1937–2003), British drag queen known as Foo Foo Lammar
- Frank Ragano (1923–1998), American lawyer for organized crime
- Frank Russek (1875/1876–1948), Polish-born American co-founder of the Russeks department store chain
- Frank Schilling (born 1970), Canadian-Caymanian internet investor
- Frank Smith (psycholinguist) (1928–2020), British psycholinguist
- Frank Strong (1859–1934), American educator
- Frank Sturgis, CIA operative and Watergate burglar

== Fictional characters ==
- Frank, title character of Frank and Ernest (comic strip)
- Frank, from the 1993 American comedy-drama film Mrs. Doubtfire
- Frank, a monstrous rabbit character in Donnie Darko
- Frank Angelino, on the American television sitcom Three's Company
- Frank Armitage, in the 1988 American science-fiction action thriller movie They Live
- Frank Barone, from the American sitcom Everybody Loves Raymond
- Frank Bean, a main antagonist of Fantastic Mr. Fox
- Frank Bullitt, the titular character from the 1968 film Bullitt
- Frank Burns (M*A*S*H), in the film and TV series M*A*S*H
- Frank Castle, a Marvel Comics vigilante, also called the Punisher
- Frank Costanza, from the American sitcom Seinfeld
- Frank Dawson, in the 1959–1960 syndicated TV series This Man Dawson
- Frank Dawson, a character in the 1981 American made-for-television movie Fallen Angel
- Frank Dawson, in the 2013 American black comedy crime film Life of Crime
- Frank Drebin, main character of the action comedy film series The Naked Gun
- Frank Gallagher (Shameless), from the series Shameless
- Frank Grimes (The Simpsons), in the animated sitcom The Simpsons
- Frank Heffley, in the book series Diary of a Wimpy Kid
- Frank Horrigan, the main antagonist of the video game Fallout 2
- Frank Langdon, in the American medical drama TV series The Pitt
- Frank Mercer, the main antagonist from Need for Speed Heat
- Frank Milo, in the 1993 American crime comedy-drama movie Mad Dog and Glory, played by Bill Murray
- Frank Mitchell, father of the title character in Moesha
- Frank Murphy, in the 1983 film Blue Thunder
- Frank N. Furter, the main antagonist in the 1975 film The Rocky Horror Picture Show
- Frank Olsen, a character in the film Mr. Nanny
- Frank the Pug, from the Men in Black franchise
- Frank Reynolds (It's Always Sunny in Philadelphia), from the FX TV series It's Always Sunny in Philadelphia, portrayed by Danny DeVito
- Frank Rock, DC comics character also known as Sgt. Rock
- Frank Rowan, in the 1951 novel Camilla Dickinson
- Frank Spencer (Michael Crawford), the main character of the BBC sitcom Some Mothers Do Ave Em
- Frank Sobotka, a character from The Wire
- Frank Sahwit, a character from the Ace Attorney video game series
- Frank Tenpenny, the main antagonist from Grand Theft Auto: San Andreas
- Frank Veliano, main antagonist of the video game Gangstar Vegas
- Frank West (Dead Rising), in the Dead Rising video game series
- Frank White, lead character in the 1990 film King of New York
- Frank Zhang, one of the seven from Rick Riordan's Heroes of Olympus
- TV's Frank, from the TV series Mystery Science Theater 3000, named for Frank Lanham
- Frank, a character in the mobile video games, Brawl Stars and Squad Busters

== See also ==
- Franc (disambiguation)
- Frances (disambiguation)
- Francis (disambiguation)
- Franck (disambiguation)
- Frankie (disambiguation)
- Franks (disambiguation)
- Franklin (given name)
