= Franklin (given name) =

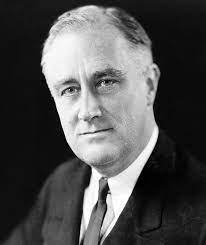
- President Franklin D. Roosevelt
- Gender: Male

Origin
- Language: English
- Meaning: Free Landowner

Other names
- Related names: Frank, Frankie, Francis, Francesca, Francine, Frans, Franz

Franklin is a masculine English given name. It is of English coming from the medieval English Frankeleyn, coming from the Anglo-Norman fraunclein. Its meaning is landowner of free but not noble origin.

== People with the given name ==
- Franklin O. Adams (1881–1967), American architect
- Franklin P. Adams (1881–1960), American columnist
- Franklin Adreon (1902–1979), American actor
- Franklin A. Alberger (1825–1877), American businessman and politician
- Franklin Anangonó (1974–2022), Ecuadorian footballer
- Franklin Anzité (born 1985), Central African footballer
- Franklin Bache (1792–1864), American physician
- Franklin P. Backus (1913–2007), American judge
- Franklin Thomas Backus (1813–1870), American lawyer and politician
- Franklin Barreto (born 1996), Venezuelan baseball player
- Franklin Bautista (born 1952), Filipino politician and governor
- Franklin Bett (born 1953), Kenyan politician
- Franklin Bishop (1932–2016), American politician
- Franklin Bittencourt (born 1969), Brazilian football scout, coach, and player
- Franklin Booth (1874–1948), American artist
- Franklin Boukaka (1940–1972), Congolese musician
- Franklin W. Bowdon (1817–1857), American politician and slave owner
- Franklin Brito (1960–2010), Venezuelan biologist and political activist
- Franklin Brownell (1857–1946), American-Canadian artist and teacher
- Franklin Bruno (born 1968), American singer-songwriter, academic and writer
- Franklin Buchanan (1812–1851), American politician
- Franklin Burghardt (1912–1981), American football and basketball coach and athlete
- Franklin Burroughs (1834–1897), American entrepreneur
- Franklin Burroughs, American author
- Franklin Carmichael (1890–1945), Canadian artist
- Franklin B. Carpenter (1818–1862), American lumber merchant and politician
- Franklin Metcalfe Carpenter (1847–1907), Canadian politician
- Franklin R. Carpenter (1848–1910), American mining specialist
- Franklin Chang-Díaz (born 1950), Costa Rican-American astronaut and entrepreneur
- Franklin Cohen (born 1946), American clarinetist
- Franklin A. Coles (1861–1943), American lawyer and politician
- Franklin R. Collbohm (1907–1990), American engineer
- Franklin S. Cooper (1908–1999), American physicist and inventor
- Franklin Cover (1928–2006), American actor
- Franklin Cudjoe (born 1976), Ghanaian writer and social commentator
- Franklin A. Davis (born 1939), American chemist
- Franklin M. Davis Jr. (1918–1980), American author and major general
- Franklin Archibald Dick (1823–1885), American lawyer
- Franklin Hughes Delano (1813–1893), American merchant, diplomat and society man
- Franklin Dodge (1891–1968), American FBI agent
- Franklin Pierce Doremus (1852–1944), American vegetarianism activist
- Franklin D'Olier (1877–1953), American businessman
- Franklin Drilon (born 1945), Filipino politician
- Franklin Dyall (1870–1950), English actor
- Franklin Edson (1832–1904), American politician
- Franklin Edwards (born 1959), American basketball player
- Franklin Engelmann (1908–1972), British radio personality
- Franklin B. Evans (1807–1874), American murderer and suspected serial killer
- Franklin Florence (1934–2023), American civil rights activist
- Franklin Delano Floyd (1943–2023), American murderer
- Franklin Ford (1920–2003), American historian
- Franklin Franco (1936–2013), Dominican historian, sociologist, and politician
- Franklin Clark Fry (1900–1968), American Lutheran clergyman
- Franklin Foster Fry (1864–1933), American Lutheran minister
- Franklin I. Gamwell (1937–2023), American philosopher
- Franklin Garcia (born 1969), American politician
- Franklin Gómez (born 1986), Puerto Rican wrestler
- Franklin B. Gowen (1836–1889), American president of the Philadelphia and Reading Railroad
- Franklin Graham (born 1952), American Christian evangelist, missionary, and son of Billy Graham
- Franklin Gutiérrez (born 1983), Venezuelan baseball player
- Franklin L. Hagenbeck (born 1949), American Army general
- Franklin Hansen (1897–1982), American sound engineer
- Franklin S. Harris (1884–1960), American university president
- Franklin A. Hart (1894–1967), American general in the United States Marine Corps
- Franklin Hobbs (born 1947), American rower
- Franklin Pierce Holland (1852–1928), American publisher and the mayor of Dallas
- Franklin B. Hough (1822–1885), American Civil War surgeon and civil servant
- Franklin Huddle (born 1943), American diplomat
- Franklin D. Israel (1945–1996), American architect
- Franklin Jacobs (born 1957), American high jumper
- Franklin Johnson (disambiguation), several people
- Franklin Khan (died 2021), Trinidad and Tobago politician
- Franklin J. Knoll (born 1940), American politician, lawyer, and judge
- Franklin Lacey (1917–1988), American playwright and screenwriter
- Franklin R. Levy (1948–1992), American film producer
- Franklin Lindsay (1916–2011), American spy and business executive
- Franklin Lobos (born 1957), Chilean footballer and miner
- Franklin A. Long (1910–1999), American chemist
- Franklin MacVeagh (1837–1934), American politician
- Franklin Main (1918–2008), American politician
- Franklin B. Mann (1941–2022), American politician
- Franklin Ware Mann (1856–1916), American physician and inventor
- Franklin Clarence Mars (1883–1934), American businessman
- Franklin Mascote (born 1996), Brazilian footballer
- Franklin Matthias (1908–1993), American nuclear engineer
- Franklin Merrell-Wolff (1887–1985), American philosopher and mystic
- Franklin Milton (1907–1985), American sound engineer
- Franklin Molina (born 1984), Venezuelan cyclist
- Franklin Morales (born 1986), Venezuelan baseball player
- Franklin Murphy (1846–1920), American politician
- Franklin David Murphy (1916–1994), American academic administrator
- Franklin Nelson (1933–2019), American ice dancer
- Franklin A. Neva (1922–2011), American physician
- Franklin W. Olin (1860–1951), American baseball player and civil engineer
- Franklin Pangborn (1889–1958), American actor
- Franklin Peale (1795–1870), American mint official
- Franklin Pele (born 2000), New Zealand rugby league and rugby union footballer
- Franklin Pérez (born 1997), Venezuelan baseball pitcher
- Franklin P. Peterson (1930–2000), American mathematician specializing in algebraic topology
- Franklin Pierce (1804–1869), 14th President of the United States of America
- Franklin Quitugua (1933–2015), Guamanian politician
- Franklin Raines (born 1949), American businessman and federal executive
- Franklin Rawson (1819/1820–1871), Argentine painter
- Franklin Reytor (born 1982), Cuban guitarist, composer and producer
- Franklin D. Richards (1821–1899), American apostle of the LDS Church
- Franklin S. Richards (1849–1934), American politician and general counsel for the LDS Church
- Franklin D. Richards (1900–1987), American lawyer and a general authority of the LDS Church
- Franklin Lafayette Riley Jr. (1868–1929), American historian
- Franklin D. Roosevelt (1882–1945), 32nd President of the United States of America
- Franklin D. Roosevelt Jr. (1914–1988), American lawyer, businessman, and politician
- Franklin D. Roosevelt III (born 1938), American educator
- Franklin Rumbiak (born 1989), Indonesian footballer
- Franklin Salas (born 1981), Ecuadorian footballer
- Franklin Benjamin Sanborn (1831–1917), American journalist, teacher, reformer, and abolitionist
- Franklin Sands (born 1940), American politician
- Franklin Sasere (born 1988), Swiss footballer
- Franklin J. Schaffner (1920–1989), American director
- Franklin Sellers (1926–2016), American Reformed Episcopalian bishop
- Franklin Session (born 1989), American basketball player
- Franklin Simmons (1839–1913), American sculptor
- Franklin Sirmans, American art critic, editor, writer, and curator
- Franklin Sonn (born 1939), South African diplomat, businessman and activist
- Franklin Sousley (1925–1945), American Marine
- Franklin Southworth (born 1929), American linguist
- Franklin B. Sprague (1825–1895), American military officer, businessman and judge
- Franklin Stahl (1929–2025), American molecular biologist and geneticist
- Franklin Stanwood (1852–1888), American painter
- Franklin Steele (c. 1813–1880), American settler
- Franklin Stubbs (born 1960), American baseball player
- Franklin Taylor (1843–1919), English pianist, organist, music educator, and writer
- Franklin A. Thomas (1934–2021), American businessman and philanthropist
- Franklin D. Turner (1933–2013), American prelate
- Franklin P. Turner (1827–1889), American lawyer and delegate
- Franklin U. Valderrama (born 1962), American judge
- Franklin Van Valkenburgh (1888–1941), American Navy Medal of Honor recipient
- Franklin Virgüez (born 1953), Venezuelan actor
- Franklin Webster (c.1862−1933), American publisher
- Franklin Webster (born 1978), Honduran footballer
- Franklin H. Westervelt (1930–2015), American computer scientist
- Franklin Wharton (1767–1818), American Marine Corps general
- Franklin Delano Williams (1947–1993), American singer
- Franklin Zielski (1941–2021), Canadian rower
- Franklin B. Zimmerman (born 1923), American musicologist and conductor
- Franklin Zimring (born 1942), American criminologist

== Fictional characters ==
- Franklin the Turtle, the protagonist of the book series and television adaptations by the same name
- Franklin, a character in the Peanuts comic strip
- Franklin Clinton, one of the three main protagonists in the 2013 video game Grand Theft Auto V
- Franklin Richards, fictional character appearing in comic books published by Marvel Comics
- Franklin Rock, a character from DC Comics, also known as Sgt. Rock
- Freewheelin' Franklin Freek, one of the Fabulous Furry Freak Brothers.
- Franklin Delano Bluth, a puppet on Arrested Development
- Franklin Stern, a fictional character in the DC Comics universe

== Related names ==
- Frank (given name), a short name for Franklin
- Franklin (surname)
