= Charlie Miller (hairdresser) =

Scottish celebrity hairdresser (1944–2025)

Charlie Miller OBE
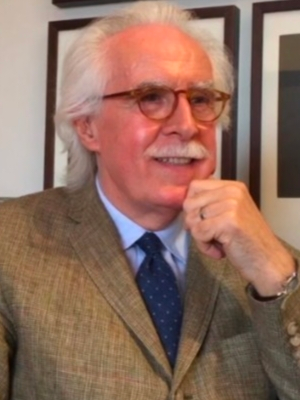
- Miller in 2016
- Born: Charles Stewart Miller; 10 September 1944; Edinburgh, Scotland
- Died: 14 July 2025 (aged 80); Edinburgh, Scotland
- Years active: 1965–2022
- Spouse: Janet Spence (m. 1965)
- Children: 2
- Website: Official website

Charles Stewart Miller OBE (10 September 1944 – 14 July 2025) was a Scottish celebrity hairdresser.

== Life and career ==
Born in Edinburgh on 10 September 1944, Miller began his training at Bob's Barber Shop, a barber shop in the city's West Port, at the age of 15. In 1965, he established his own hairdressing business, which went on to open five salons across Edinburgh, employing more than 100 people. His business, Charlie Miller Hairdressing Ltd, became known internationally, and during his career he cut the hair of many A-list celebrities, including actors Sean Connery and Leslie Nielsen, and fashion designer Donna Karan. He was a friend of the businessman Tom Farmer, and in 2010, travelled to the North Pole to cut his hair in order to raise money for the charity Teenage Cancer Trust. The company celebrated its 50th anniversary in 2015. As part of the celebrations, Anne, Princess Royal visited one of Miller's salons and presented him with a plaque.

In late 2018, an offshoot brand of Charlie Miller Hairdressing called Charlie Miller Haircare was launched to offer products used by Miller's salons.

In 2007, Miller worked with the Teenage Cancer Trust to supply professionally styled wigs to young people with cancer, and who had lost their own hair as a result of treatment. The wigs are styled by some of the UK's leading hairdressers. The "Hair 4 U" initiative would later be operated by The Little Princess Trust. For his services to hairdressing, Miller received an OBE in the 2012 New Year Honours, becoming the first Scottish hairdresser to be recognised with such an honour.

== Awards and honours ==
Miller was a winner of the Scottish Hairdresser of the Year Award on three occasions, as well as the Avant-Garde Hairdresser of the Year. He was also twice nominated for British Hairdresser of the Year. Miller also received the Lifetime Achievement Award from both The Guild of Hairdressers and the Fellowship for British Hairdressing, where he was declared Fellow of Distinction. He was inducted into the Association Internationale Presse Professionnelle Coiffure Hall of Fame in 2022. In addition, he judged a number of major hairdressing competitions, including the British Hairdressing Awards, L'Oréal Colour Trophy (both in the UK and internationally), Creative HEAD Magazine Most Wanted Awards, and Japanese, Dutch, and Norwegian Hairdresser of the Year.

== Personal life and death ==
Miller married Janet Spence in 1965, with whom he had two children. They both followed him into the hairdressing business, and became Managing Directors of Charlie Miller Hairdressing.

Miller was diagnosed with Alzheimer's disease in 2015, and spent the last three years of his life at the Queen's Manor Care Home in Edinburgh. He died there on 14 July 2025, at the age of 80.
