= Franklin Webster =

Franklin Webster may refer to:

- Franklin Webster (publisher) (1862-1933), American publisher
- Franklin Webster (footballer) (born 1978), Honduran footballer
