= Sam Adams Award =

American annual award for intelligence professionals

The Sam Adams Award is given annually since 2002 to an intelligence professional who has taken a stand for integrity and ethics. The award is granted by the Sam Adams Associates for Integrity in Intelligence, a group of retired CIA officers. It is named after Samuel A. Adams, a CIA whistleblower during the Vietnam War, and takes the physical form of a "corner-brightener candlestick".

Ray McGovern established the Sam Adams Associates "to reward intelligence officials who demonstrated a commitment to truth and integrity, no matter the consequences."

The 2012, 2013, and 2014 awards were presented at the Oxford Union.

Edward Snowden receiving the Sam Adams Award in October 2013.

== Recipients ==
- 2002: FBI agent and whistleblower Coleen Rowley
- 2003: Katharine Gun, former British intelligence (GCHQ) translator; leaked top-secret information showing illegal US activities during the push for war in Iraq.
- 2004: Sibel Edmonds, former FBI translator; fired after accusing FBI officials of ignoring intelligence pointing to al-Qaeda attacks against the US.
- 2005: Craig Murray, former British ambassador to Uzbekistan who blew the whistle on UK complicity in the Uzbek government's use of torture and involvement in extraordinary rendition.
- 2006: Samuel Provance, former U.S. Army military intelligence sergeant; spoke out about abuses at the Abu Ghraib Prison.
- 2007: Andrew Wilkie, retired Australian intelligence official; claimed intelligence was being exaggerated to justify Australian support for the US invasion of Iraq.
- 2008: Frank Grevil, Danish whistleblower; leaked classified information showing no clear evidence of weapons of mass destruction in Iraq.
- 2009: Larry Wilkerson, former chief of staff to United States Secretary of State Colin Powell and Iraq War critic.
- 2010: Julian Assange, editor-in-chief and founder of WikiLeaks.
- 2011: Thomas Andrews Drake, former senior executive of the U.S. National Security Agency (NSA); Jesselyn Radack, former ethics adviser to the U.S. Department of Justice.
- 2012: Thomas Fingar, former chairman of the National Intelligence Council.
- 2013: Edward Snowden, leaked NSA material showing mass surveillance by the agency, sparking heated debate.
- 2014: Chelsea Manning, U.S. Army soldier convicted in July 2013 of violations of the Espionage Act and other offenses.
- 2015: William Binney, former highly placed intelligence official with the NSA turned whistleblower.
- 2016: John Kiriakou, former CIA analyst and case officer who publicly confirmed the employment of waterboarding against detainees and characterized the practice as torture.
- 2017: Seymour Hersh, Pulitzer Prize-winning investigative journalist who reported on the My Lai massacre, the Abu Ghraib scandal, and alleged misrepresentations of the 2013 Ghouta attack and the 2017 Khan Shaykhun attack.
- 2018: Karen Kwiatkowski, U.S. Air Force officer who became a whistleblower, leaking material behind the film Shock and Awe.
- 2019: Jeffrey Sterling, CIA whistleblower.
- 2020: Annie Machon, MI5 whistleblower.
- 2021: Daniel Hale, U.S. Air Force enlisted airman who became an intelligence analyst for the NSA in Afghanistan and later exposed the consequences of drone strikes.
- 2022: Daniel Ellsberg, former U.S. military analyst who released the Pentagon Papers, showing that the public had been misled about the Vietnam War, to a number of newspapers in 1971.
- 2024: Aaron Bushnell, senior airman in the United States Air Force who engaged in a fatal act of self-immolation in protest against United States support for Israel in the Gaza war on February 25, 2024 (posthumously awarded).
- 2025: Anthony Aguilar, retired US Army Lieutenant Colonel and former Green Beret officer serving as a security contractor on behalf of the Gaza Humanitarian Foundation (GHF), who disclosed alleged misconduct and war crimes associated with GHF operations.
- 2026: David McBride, former British Army Major and Australian Army lawyer who provided classified material to the Australian Broadcasting Corporation containing evidence of war crimes by Australian servicemembers during the War in Afghanistan, corroborated by the release of the Brereton Report.

== Sources ==
- Carlo, Silkie (February 20, 2014). "Chelsea Manning and Edward Snowden Criticize the "Decline" of US Democracy". Motherboard.
- "Former National Security Whistleblowers Meet in Moscow and Award Sam Adams Prize to Snowden". Government Accountability Project. October 10, 2013. Archived from the original on November 14, 2013.
- "Former U.S. officials give NSA whistleblower Snowden award in Russia". Haaretz. Associated Press. October 10, 2013. Archived from the original on October 12, 2013.
- "Frank Grevil får whistleblower-pris" [Frank Grevil gets whistleblower award] (in Danish). DR. January 26, 2009.
- Horton, Scott (September 21, 2007). "Sam Adams Award to Sam Provance". Harper's Magazine.
- "Karen Kwiatkowski Receives 17th Sam Adams Award 2018". The Sam Adams Associates for Integrity in Intelligence. December 8, 2018.
- McGovern, Ray. "Sam Adams Award". Archived from the original on January 16, 2014.
- Nicks, Denver (February 19, 2014). "Snowden Congratulates Chelsea Manning". Time.
- Rowley, Coleen (October 19, 2009). "Colonel Larry Wilkerson to Receive 2009 Sam Adams Truthtelling Award". HuffPost.
- "Sam Adams Awards including videolink with Julian Assange". Oxford Union. January 23, 2013. Archived from the original on April 21, 2014.
