= Anthony Aguilar =

US Army veteran and whistleblower

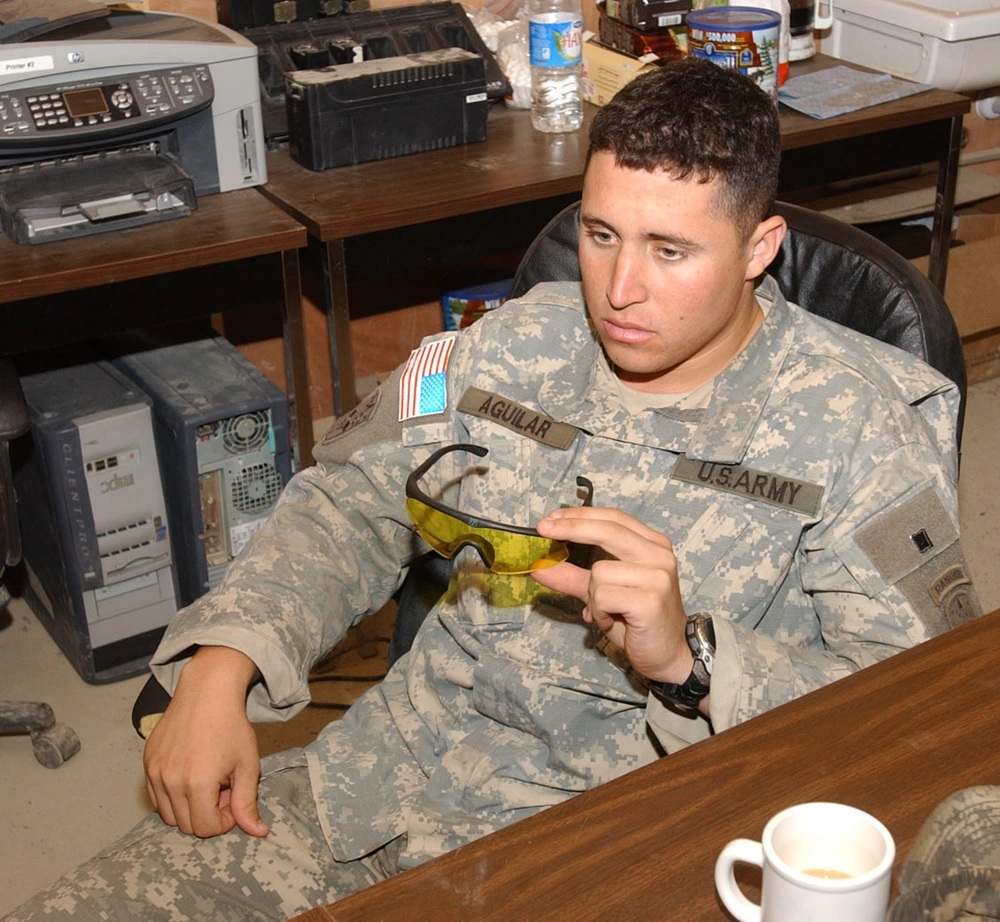
- Aguilar during his time in the U.S. Army, 2006
- Education: United States Military Academy (BS); University of Texas at Arlington (Executive MScBA); USACGSC (MMAS)
- Military career
- Allegiance: United States
- Branch: United States Army
- Service years: 2004–2024
- Rank: Lieutenant Colonel
- Known for: Whistleblowing
- Conflicts: Iraq War; War in Afghanistan
- Awards: Bronze Star Medal (Valor); Purple Heart; Sam Adams Award

Anthony Aguilar is a retired United States Army Lieutenant Colonel and Special Forces officer (Green Beret) who served for 25 years. In 2025, he became known as a whistleblower after making public allegations about operations at U.S.-and-Israeli-backed Gaza Humanitarian Foundation (GHF) aid distribution sites in Gaza, where he worked as a security contractor for UG Solutions. His allegations of misconduct and war crimes at the aid sites sparked significant media coverage and official inquiries.

== Education ==
Aguilar holds a Bachelor of Science from the United States Military Academy (2004), an Executive Master of Science in Business Administration from the University of Texas at Arlington (2008), and a Master of Military Art and Science from the United States Army Command and General Staff College (2014).

== Military career ==
Aguilar was commissioned as an Infantry officer in the United States Army upon his graduation from the United States Military Academy at West Point in 2004. He served for 20 years, attaining the rank of Lieutenant Colonel and becoming a Green Beret.

During a deployment to Mosul, Iraq in 2006 as a First Lieutenant with the 172nd Stryker Brigade Combat Team, Aguilar was wounded when an IED fragment struck his face; he credited his protective eyewear with saving his eyesight. His deployments included missions in Iraq, Afghanistan, Tajikistan, Jordan, and the Philippines.

In 2014, as a Major, Aguilar completed his graduate studies at the United States Army Command and General Staff College, publishing a thesis that developed a new framework for analyzing insurgency and parastatal relationships in conflict zones.

== Gaza Humanitarian Foundation whistleblower allegations ==
In mid-2025, Aguilar worked as a security contractor in Gaza for UG Solutions, which was contracted to provide security at aid distribution sites operated by the Gaza Humanitarian Foundation (GHF). He resigned from his position after approximately two months, later becoming a whistleblower by publicly alleging severe misconduct.

=== Key allegations ===
Aguilar's primary allegations, based on his public statements and interviews, include:

- Witnessing contractors firing automatic weapons at crowds of civilians, which he described as "indiscriminate and unnecessary force"
- Characterizing the aid sites as "designed as death traps," built in active combat zones and surrounded by razor wire, which he stated violates the Geneva Conventions
- Alleging that the aid sites served as "biometric surveillance honeypots," where Palestinians' faces were scanned to identify "persons of interest" for the IDF to target.
- Reporting that a young boy named Amir was killed by gunfire shortly after collecting aid at one of the distribution points
- Alleging that a woman was killed by a stun grenade fragment, contradicting GHF's claim that she suffered from heat exhaustion
- Claiming contractors were armed with armor-piercing ammunition and were in Israel on tourist visas, which he argued violated international law
- Describing the aid distribution process as chaotic and insufficient to address famine conditions in Gaza

Aguilar stated that his motivation for speaking out was based on his military training and commitment to "American values," despite claiming that he and his family had been threatened. He testified about these conditions before Senator Chris Van Hollen and coordinated with fellow whistleblower and former Army Intelligence officer Josephine Guilbeau to provide testimony at a congressional hearing.

==== Responses to allegations ====
The GHF and UG Solutions have denied Aguilar's allegations. A GHF statement called the allegations "categorically false" and described Aguilar as a "disgruntled former contractor who was terminated for misconduct," a claim Aguilar denies. UG Solutions' legal counsel stated that Aguilar was terminated on June 13, 2025, for "poor performance, volatile conflicts with staff and erratic behavior," and accused him of fabricating evidence. The GHF also released affidavits from other contractors who claimed they did not witness the events Aguilar described. The Israel Defense Forces (IDF) said the incidents were "under review."

=== Dispute over reported death of Palestinian boy (2025) ===
In September 2025, the GHF stated that a Palestinian boy, whom Anthony Aguilar had reported as shot and killed by the IDF, was alive and had been relocated outside Gaza with his mother. The boy was identified as Abdul Rahim Muhammad Hamden (nicknamed "Abood"), nearly 9 years old. Aguilar had claimed in July 2025 that the boy, whom he referred to as "Amir" in media interviews, including with the BBC, was shot after receiving food at a GHF distribution site in southern Gaza. Aguilar accused the GHF of complicity in war crimes and described IDF troops and U.S. contractors as using "indiscriminate" force against civilians, which drew international attention.

In a GHF press briefing on September 4, 2025, spokesperson Chapin Fay stated that the IDF did not shoot Abood and described Aguilar's allegations as "entirely fabricated," noting that Abood confirmed he was never harmed by GHF or Israeli forces. The GHF reported locating the boy and his mother through biometrics, local inquiries, and family contacts. They claimed to have confirmed his identity using photographs and video footage, including images of him in the same shirt described in Aguilar's claims, as well as a statement from the mother that the evacuation was voluntary for the child's well-being. The organization said it prioritized the search due to concerns that Aguilar's publicity had endangered the child, potentially making him a target for Hamas, which the GHF accused of benefiting from the narrative. An internal GHF investigation, cross-referencing timelines, videos, and on-ground sources, led the organization to reject Aguilar's allegations.

== Political career ==
In January 2026, Aguilar announced on Instagram that he would be running for the House of Representatives as a Green Party candidate for North Carolina's 13th congressional district. Aguilar received an endorsement from the Anti-Zionist America PAC (AZAPAC). He rejected AZAPAC's endorsement after receiving questions from The Intercept about the use of antisemitic language by AZAPAC founder Michael Rectenwald and AZAPAC's ties to far-right figures. His campaign noted that anti-Zionists "are falsely accused on antisemitism on a regular basis... For that reason, we want to avoid being associated with any group whose statements or actions raise credible concerns of actual antisemitism."
