= Francesco Mazza =

Italian script-writer and director

Francesco (Francio) Mazza (born 1982) is an Italian writer, screenwriter, and director from Milan.

He began his career as a recurring guest on Michele Santoro’s talk shows (Circus, Il Raggio Verde) aired on Rai 2, and later worked as a reporter for Mosquito on Italia 1. In 2003, he joined Antonio Ricci's team, contributing as a writer to Striscia la notizia, aired on Canale 5, Paperissima Sprint and Le Nuove Mostre.

After moving to New York to study filmmaking, he collaborated with american director Amos Poe on the short film Frankie (Italian Roulette), in which he also acted as the main character. Frankie (Italian Roulette) was a finalist at Nastri d'Argento awards.

Mazza directed the documentaries Graffiti a New York that premiered on Sky Arte (2015) and features some of the most relevant graffiti writers of all time, and Ettore Majorana - L’Uomo del futuro (2018), on the life and the legacy of Italian scientist Ettore Majorana.

His web series Estremi Rimedi ("Full measures") won multiple awards, including Best Italian Web Series at the Digital Media Fest in 2019.

His literary works include "Il veleno nella coda" ("The poison in the tail"), described by italian literary critic Giovanni Pacchiano as "the Coscienza di Zeno of our time". In September 2024, he returned to Striscia la notizia as an on-screen correspondent, portraying the character "Il Vendicatore dei giovani".

For years, he has been writing op-eds, satirical articles and special reports for various international media outlets. His works appeared in Libération, Linkiesta, Charlie Hebdo, RaiNews24 among others. In 2016 he won the Macchianera Internet Award for best article of the year, with an article about Charlie Hebdo Comics published on the Italian online magazine Gli Stati Generali.

== TV shows ==
Year	Film	Channel	Role
2001-2002	Mosquito	Italia 1	Talent
2003-2012	Striscia la notizia	Canale 5	Writer
2008-2012	Paperissima Sprint	Canale 5	Writer
2009-2010	Mattino 5	Canale 5	Writer
2010-2012	Le nuove mostre	Canale 5	Writer
2011	Big End	Rai 4	Writer
2017-2018	Buffa racconta il Sundance Film Festival	Sky Cinema	Director of photography
2024-present	Striscia la notizia	Canale 5	On-screen correspondent

== Filmography ==
Year	Film	Role
2014	Vera Bes "Sotto la Maschera"	Writer, director
2015	Frankie (Italian Roulette)	Writer, director, actor
2015	Graffiti a New York	Writer, director, executive producer
2017	Broken Eggs	Writer, director
2017	Estremi Rimedi	Writer, director, actor
2018	Ettore Majorana - L'uomo del futuro	Writer, director

== Books ==
Year	Title	Publisher
2021	Il veleno nella coda	Laurana Editore
