= The United Strand =

British social media influencer

- Born: Frank Ilett; 10 June 1996 (age 30); Oxford, Oxfordshire, England
- Occupation: Social media influencer

Instagram information
- Page: theunitedstrand
- Years active: 2024–present
- Followers: 1.6 million

TikTok information
- Page: The United Strand
- Years active: 2025–present
- Followers: 1.4 million

YouTube information
- Channel: The United Strand
- Years active: 2025–present
- Subscribers: 159 thousand
- Views: 89 million
- Last updated: 21 September 2026

Frank Ilett (born 10 June 1996), known professionally as The United Strand, is a British social media influencer. He is best known for his video series of posting himself everyday of not cutting his hair off until his favourite football club Manchester United F.C. wins five games in a row on Instagram.

== Life and career ==
Ilett was born in Oxford, Oxfordshire. He emigrated to Spain in November 2023, settling in Castellón to live closer with his girlfriend's family, and to raise his daughter.

On 5 October 2024, Ilett cut all of his hair off and began his video series on Instagram, posting himself everyday of not cutting his hair off until his favourite football club Manchester United F.C. wins five games in a row. According to BBC Sport, he expected that the club would win within three or four months, stating that "it was meant for a laugh, and then that would be it". His video series gained popularity, garnering over 1.5 million followers on Instagram. Aside from his video series, he helped raise money for The Little Princess Trust, a children's charity.
