= Frankie =

Frankie or Franky may refer to:

== People ==
- Frankie Bird, indie pop musician from Los Angeles, California
- Frankie Abernathy (1981–2007), American MTV Real World cast member
- Frankie Adams (born 1994), Samoan New Zealand actress
- Frankie Armstrong (born 1941), English singer and voice teacher
- Frankie Avalon (born 1940), American actor, singer and teen idol
- Frankie Ballard (born 1982), American country singer-songwriter and guitarist
- Frankie Barnet, Canadian author
- Frankie Boyle (born 1972), Scottish comedian
- Frankie Bridge (born 1989), English singer-songwriter
- Frankie Brown (born 1987), Scottish footballer
- Frankie Carle (1903–2001), American pianist and bandleader
- Frankie Corio (born 2010), Scottish actress
- Frankie Cosmos, American musician and singer-songwriter
- Frankie Crosetti (1910–2002), American baseball player
- Frankie Cutlass (born 1971), American hip-hop producer, DJ, and rapper
- Frankie Darro (1917–1976), American actor and stuntman
- Frankie Doom, drag performer and contestant on The Boulet Brothers' Dragula
- Frankie Evangelista (1934–2004), Filipino newspaper columnist, radio and television broadcaster
- Frankie Faison (born 1949), American actor
- Frankie Ford (1939–2015), stage name of Vincent Francis Guzzo, American singer
- Frankie Fredericks (born 1967), Namibian sprinter
- Frankie Frisch (1898–1973), American baseball player and manager
- Frankie Giorgi (born 1981), Australian kickboxer
- Frankie Grande (born 1983), American producer, actor, singer, dancer, and contestant on the TV series Big Brother
- Frankie Hargis (1965–2021), Cherokee politician
- Frankie Hi-NRG MC (born 1969), Italian rapper
- Frankie Howerd (1917–1992), English comedian
- Frankie J (born 1976), stage name of Mexican American singer Francisco Javier Bautista, Jr., formerly of Kumbia Kings
- Frankie Jonas (born 2000), American actor
- Frankie Kennedy (1955–1994), Irish musician
- Frankie Knuckles (1955–2014), American DJ
- Frankie Laine (1913–2007), American singer, songwriter and actor
- Frankie Lam (born 1967), Hong Kong actor
- Frankie Lor, Hong Kong horse racing trainer and former jockey
- Frankie Luvu (born 1996), American football player
- Frankie Lymon (1942–1968), African-American rock and roll/rhythm and blues singer
- Frankie Manning (1914–2009), American dancer
- Frankie Miller (born 1949), English singer songwriter
- Frankie Muniz (born 1985), American actor
- Frankie Shaw (born 1986), American actress
- Frankie Thomas (1921–2006), American actor
- Frankie Valli (born 1934), American pop singer
- Frankie Vaughan (1928–1999), English pop singer
- Frankie Yale (1893–1928), Italian American gangster
- Franky Tchaouna (born 2005), Chadian footballer

== Fictional characters ==
- Franky (One Piece), in the anime and manga series One Piece
- Franky, a character in the Disney game Club Penguin
- Frankie, in The Nut Job
- Frankie, a caricature of Frankenstein's monster featured on the Groovie Goolies animated cartoon.
- Franky Andrade, of Yo soy Franky, a Colombian television series
- Frankie, a great white shark in the 2004 film Shark Tale
- Frankie Bergstein, in Grace and Frankie, an American comedy web television series
- Frankie Cheeks, in the film Final Destination 3
- Frankie Del Marco, in the Netflix series Grand Army
- Frankie the Dog, an anthropomorphic dachshund and a mascot of the JumpStart educational franchise
- Frankie Foster, a major recurring character in the American animated television series Foster's Home for Imaginary Friends
- Frankie Gaines, of I Am Frankie, an American television series
- Frankie Hathaway, in The Haunted Hathaways American television series
- Frankie Heck, the matriarch of the Indiana family portrayed in the American TV show The Middle
- Frankie Hough, a former Hollyoaks character
- Frankie McCourt, in Angela’s Ashes
- Frankie Osborne, in the British soap opera Hollyoaks
- Frankie Pamplemousse, a character in the animated television series The ZhuZhus
- Frankie Pierre, in the BBC soap opera EastEnders
- Frankie Raye, a Fantastic Four character and a herald of Galactus in Marvel Comics
- Frankie Stein, daughter of Frankenstein in the Monster High American fashion doll franchise
- Frankie the Squealer, a mafia member in the animated television series The Simpsons
- Uncle Frank/Frankie, uncle of main character Kevin in the film Home Alone
- Uncle Frank, main character in the film Double Impact
- Frankie and Jamie, two criminal brothers in the film American Heist

== Music ==
- "Frankie" (Connie Francis song), a 1959 single
- "Frankie" (Sister Sledge song), a 1985 single
- "Frankie and Johnny", also known as "Frankie", or "Frankie and Albert", a traditional American popular song
- "Frankie", a song by Betty Blowtorch from Are You Man Enough?
- "Frankie" a song by Bruce Springsteen from Tracks
- "Frankie (We love you!)" a song performed on show 7 of the Groovy Goolies animated cartoon, paying homage to the character of that name.

== Films ==
- Frankie, a 1939 film released as Back Door to Heaven
- Frankie (2005 film), a French film starring Diane Kruger
- Frankie (Italian Roulette), a 2015 short film by Francesco Mazza
- Frankie (2019 film), a French film

== Other uses ==
- Frankie (TV series), a 2013 drama series from the BBC starring Eve Myles as title character Frankie Maddox
- Frankie (magazine), a bi-monthly Australian magazine
- Frankie, macaw mascot of American professional wrestler Koko B. Ware
- Frankie, a type of Mumbai street food
