= Johnnie Moore Jr. =

American evangelical leader and businessman (born 1983)

- Born: July 7, 1983 (age 43)
- Occupations: Founder and CEO of The Kairos Company, chairman of Gaza Humanitarian Foundation

Johnnie Moore (born July 7, 1983) is an American evangelical leader and businessman who founded the Kairos Company, a public relations firm. Moore is a former commissioner for the United States Commission on International Religious Freedom and co-founder and president of Congress of Christian Leaders. In June 2025 he was appointed the executive chairman of the Gaza Humanitarian Foundation. Moore is vice chancellor of Pepperdine University's Washington, D.C., campus and managing director of its Master of Middle East Policy Studies program.

== Liberty University ==
Moore began his career in at Liberty University working in the campus pastor's office. He was senior vice president for communications at Liberty University and often served as Jerry Falwell's assistant during his travels. He was a professor of religion, and led the university's convocations.

== International religious liberty ==
Moore was a commissioner of the United States Commission on International Religious Freedom from 2018 to 2021.

=== China ===
He has stood up for pro-democracy advocates in Hong Kong, including Catholic businessman Jimmy Lai. Moore condemned China's treatment of Muslims in 2017 and wrote an open letter to the Chinese premier alongside of Rabbi Abraham Cooper from the Simon Wiesenthal Center. In May 2021, the People's Republic of China issued retaliatory sanctions against Moore that banned him from entering the territory that it controls and the United States issued sanctions against a Chinese official for the official's involvement in the detention of Falun Gong practitioners.

=== Middle East ===
In 2017, Moore attended a press conference for the Simon Wiesenthal Center's Museum of Tolerance in Los Angeles, where he called for tolerance and an end to bigotry. Moore played a key role in the release of the historic Bahrain Declaration calling for rights for religious minorities in the Middle East. Days after the move of the Jerusalem embassy, Moore led a multi-faith peace delegation from the Kingdom of Bahrain on a pilgrimage in Jerusalem.

In September 2018, Christianity Today called Moore the "most high profile evangelical" to ever visit Saudi Arabia. As part of a group of evangelical advisors to President Trump, Moore met with Saudi crown prince Mohammed bin Salman and discussed the death of Jamal Khashoggi as well as human rights issues. In 2018, with a group led by Joel C. Rosenberg, and invited by the UAE government, Moore met with senior government officials for four days. He also met with the World Council of Churches.

In 2019, he visited Saudi Arabia on 9/11 and is an advocate of the Crown Prince's Vision 2030 reform agenda. Moore praised the Kingdom of Jordan for its interfaith efforts as well as praising Azerbaijani president Ilham Aliyev as a model of peaceful coexistence. He issued a travel warning for Turkey in light of its illegal imprisonment of evangelical pastor, Andrew Brunson.

Moore referred to the ISIS as a "once in a 1000 year threat to Christianity". He helped raise money for and coordinate the evacuation of selected Christian refugees from Northern Iraq to Slovakia over Christmas in 2015. On September 11, 2019, he and Muhammad al-Isa of the Muslim World League issued a joint statement calling for cooperation between evangelicals and Muslims with a focus on protecting Christian holy sites. Moore is a critic of Iran and has called for the Iranian people to take back their religion from their supreme leader. He praised Pakistan's prime minister for the arrest of a leading terrorist and in 2019 his advocacy was credited for the release of an 82-year-old Muslim prisoner of conscience in Pakistan, Abdul Shakoor.

Moore was among an evangelical delegation who met with Egyptian government officials and was the guest of Egypt's president Abdel Fattah el-Sisi for the grand opening of the Middle East's largest cathedral.

He serves on the Anti-Defamation League (ADL) Task Force on Middle East Minorities.

In June 2025 he was appointed the executive chairman of the Gaza Humanitarian Foundation.

== Political activity ==
=== Foreign policy ===
Moore supports Israel and has described himself as a Christian Zionist. In 2023, Moore said: "I started going to Israel and going to Israel again and again and again. I found so much of my faith come alive through that experience. … Israel has impacted me far, far more than almost anything else. I almost can't think of my life as inseparable from Israel in some ways."

He called the Obama foreign policy a "failed experiment in American humility” and advocated for greater American hegemony in the Trump administration while warning, "It takes theater to win the White House these days but it takes temperament to run it." In 2016, he called on European politicians to do more to combat terrorism. Moore wrote that one of the reasons why evangelicals supported Trump's move of the Jerusalem embassy was because they also care about Palestinians. He repeatedly downplayed the idea that Christian theology is why evangelicals support Israel and stated that the real reason is more about geo-politics. Moore was among a contingent of evangelical leaders who met with Israeli prime minister Benjamin Netanyahu in 2010.

=== Social justice ===
On immigration, Moore was described by NPR as "pro Trump" and "pro DACA". He collaborated with U.S. representative Nancy Pelosi in advocacy for Dreamers. He was credited along with other evangelicals with moderating the President's view on Dreamers. He condemned Jeff Sessions for his child separation policy. Moore is a noted advocate for prison reform. Trump's prison reform effort began with a conversation between Moore, Jared Kushner, Ivanka Trump and Samuel Rodriguez at a White House dinner on the eve of the National Day of Prayer.

Moore was part of a National Association of Evangelicals board that sought for legislation restricting LGTBQ discrimination to have religious exemptions.

Moore condemned racism, white supremacism and anti-semitism in the immediate aftermath of Unite the Right rally in Charlottesville, Virginia.

=== Defense of evangelical Christians ===
Moore requested that Pope Francis meet with some U.S. evangelists after an article in a Jesuit journal criticized the political involvement of American evangelicals. Moore criticized Joy Behar for remarks about Mike Pence which compared his claims of having heard Jesus to "mental illness". He advocated for the repeal of the Johnson Amendment, which bars the endorsement of political candidates by non-profits.

=== 2016 presidential elections ===
In 2016 CNN cited Moore as example of a "millennial evangelical", one of seven types of evangelicals that would make a difference in the election, quoting him as saying, "The difference between me and my parents' generation, the culture warriors, is that I actually know people on the other side, and I like them." Early in the campaign Moore was candidate Ben Carson's "special faith advisor".

Moore would go on to serve on then-candidate Donald Trump's evangelical executive board alongside former representative Michele Bachmann, founder of the Faith and Freedom Coalition Ralph Reed, and others to create a "consistent dialogue between Mr. Trump and the evangelical community". He stated he would have similarly served as an advisor to candidate Hillary Clinton had he been asked.

On June 21, 2016, Moore was among 900 evangelical leaders who met with then-candidate Trump. He also one of around 25 high-profile evangelical leaders in a smaller meeting with Trump that day. He told a reporter that what struck him was Trump's "sort of unwavering commitment to issues related to religious liberty", and that he was the "one candidate who says he will support the things that are important to us".

In 2017, after Trump was elected and in office, Moore tweeted a viral photo of evangelicals and spiritual advisers praying with Trump in the Oval Office with the caption "Such an honor to pray within the Oval Office for @POTUS & @VP."

== Gaza Humanitarian Foundation ==
Moore is the director of the Gaza Humanitarian Foundation (GHF) which is in charge of distributing aid in the Gaza Strip. The Foundation has been criticized for the opaqueness of its funding beyond the US$30 million given to it by the Trump administration. The GHF has replaced over 400 international aid distribution points with just four aid distribution hubs. Between May 27, 2025, and July 21, 2025, within less than two months, more than 1,054 Palestinian civilians had been killed and thousands more had been wounded due to being fired upon by the Israel Defense Forces (IDF) and by GHF-hired contractors while seeking humanitarian aid at those newly established four hubs in the Gaza Strip. As a response to the UN special report of the GHF hubs having become "sadistic death traps" and that snipers open fire randomly on crowds as if they're given a license to kill, Johnnie Moore claimed that the UN reports were "Lies all lies... We have seen no indication that the IDF is failing to comply with international law or its obligations."

== Written works ==
- What Am I Supposed to Do with My Life?
- The Martyr’s Oath
- 10 Things You Must Know about the Global War on Christianity
- Defying ISIS: Preserving Christianity in the Place of its Birth and in Your Own Backyard
- Dirty God

== Honors, awards and speaking engagements ==
Moore received the medal of valor from the Simon Wiesenthal Center.

Moore has spoken at the Georgetown University's Institute of Politics and Public Services and the USC's Annenberg School of Journalism. He also spoke to Joint Special Operations Command (JSOC) at Fort Bragg, NC.
