= Frank Hunter (photographer) =

Frank Hunter (born August 2, 1947) is an American documentary and fine-art photographer and university educator. He is known for his photographic landscapes and his mastery of the platinum/palladium process. His interest in photographic processes includes the technical process of exposure and development as well as the psychological and spiritual aspects of creating photographic work. "Hunter has always been famed for transforming the utterly familiar to something rich and strange."

== Education and influences ==
Frank Hunter was born in El Paso, Texas in 1947. During the early 1970s he studied photography with Gary Metz at the University of Colorado, Boulder while earning an MA in communications. (1973). At Metz's urging, Hunter studied with the photographer Nathan Lyons at the Visual Studies Workshop in Rochester New York.

From 1982 to 1985, Hunter pursued a Master of Fine Arts degree at Ohio University, where he studied with Professor Arnold Gasson. He was the first graduate student in art to be awarded the university-wide John Cady Graduate Fellowship. Upon graduation, Hunter was awarded an Artist-in-Residency Fellowship from The Issac W. Bernheim Foundation." (Louisville/Clermont, KY, 1984)

== Career ==
Hunter's interest in 19th-century processes began in the late 1970s while he working for the El Paso Public Library, where he made prints from glass-plate negatives. After receiving his Master of Fine Arts degree in 1986, Hunter moved to Atlanta [Fulton County], Georgia, where he taught photography at several universities for the following fifteen years.

In the early 1990s Hunter received a number of grants from the Fulton County Arts Council and the Arts Council for the state of Georgia. With these grants he worked to perfect alternative photographic processes, making large prints in platinum/palladium and using Printing-out paper. It was at this time that Hunter begin a relationship with a Polaroid Corporation, which encouraged his work with Polaroid materials.

The first major exhibitions of Hunter's platinum/palladium work were at Fahey Klein in Los Angeles, California (April 14-May 14, 1994) and at Jackson Fine Art in Atlanta, "Frank Hunter: Platinum/Palladium Prints" (June - July 31, 1994) Of the latter exhibition, the critic Gretchen Matis wrote, "Palladium is a process very similar to platinum. The two solutions can be mixed, as Hunter has done, for prints that are technically exquisite....This is lush, romantic imagery at its best."

In the catalog of a solo exhibition at Jackson Fine Art in 1998, "Frank Hunter: Laments," (June 4-July 31) the photographer and critic John Rosenthal wrote: "In Hunter's photographs, many of which reach out to a poised moment of ripeness, the journey to darkness is implicit--a sorrow that his quest for the brief moment of perfect light has taught him." This was followed by a two-person exhibition in 2000. This later exhibition drew the following observations from one critic: "Frank Hunter, approaches landscape and human-made structures with an almost entirely formal, surface vision in his series Still Points....Hunter hones in on the delicate detail: the lacework on the edge of a curtain, the curve of a wooden banister, the shadow cast by a windowpane on the floor. The [platinum/palladium] technique invests his photographs with an ethereality in which edges often bleed into the creamy paper they are printed on. The works not only resemble the stark compositions in photography's early formalist experiments, they intentionally mimic an even earlier phase in the medium's development and the fragile, aged images taken a century ago."

Atlanta Journal-Constitution critic Jerry Cullum wrote of Hunter's 2006 solo exhibition at Thomas Deans Fine Art, "Rich with the antique technique of platinum-palladium printing, the black-and-white pictures glow as if with an inner light....Hunters work incarnates a sense of aching nostalgia for some of us—there is nothing intrinsically mysterious about his mists and roads and secluded woodlands, but the entire sensibility of the photograph suggests another place and time....But Hunter has always been famed for transforming the utterly familiar into something rich and strange."[5]

== The South ==
Throughout the decade of the 1990s Hunter spent a week each spring photographing in the low country of South Carolina and a week photographing in the mountains of North Carolina around Asheville.

In the year 2000 he was commissioned by the Federal Reserve Bank of Atlanta to create a series of photographs entitled “Midtown at the Millennium.” The work became part of a collection of the bank and of the High Museum of Art in Atlanta.

In 2001 Hunter moved to Chapel Hill, North Carolina. For the next 13 years he taught all the wet-darkroom and alternative-process classes at the Center for Documentary Studies at Duke University in Durham, North Carolina.

In 2009 Hunter participated in the Appalachian Photography Project. (Johnson City Tennessee) As part of the Atlanta Celebrates Photography festival, Thomas Deans Fine Art presented Hunter's solo exhibition "Nocturnes," which featured nocturnal landscapes in rural Iowa lit only by the light of billboards (October 15 - November 14). In 2010 Duke University mounted an exhibition of his Appalachian photos, entitled “Still point of the Turning World.”

The Kennedy Museum, Athens, Ohio showed a series of photographs made in the 1980s in rural Athens County Ohio (2017)

== The Bleeding Pines of Turpentine ==
In 2010 Hunter was part of a project funded by the Cultural Landscape Foundation entitled “Every tree Tells a Story.” Hunter made a series of photographs of the scarred bodies of long-leaf pines that produce turpentine. The practice dates back before the American Revolution, when slaves would scar for pines to release the sap that was then boiled into turpentine. In Hunter's view the scarred bodies resembled African masks. Hunter's work was used in a back projection of a cultural theater performance piece produced and directed by Ray Owen. In 2016 Washington University mounted an exhibition of Hunter's Appalachian platinum/palladium photographs from their permanent collection: "Director's Cut: Recent Photography Gifts to the NCMA" April 4, 2015 – September 13, 2015.

== Bull City Summer: A Season at the Ballpark (2011-2013) ==
Hunter worked with a group of writers and photographers on a project conceived by Sam Stephenson commemorating the 25th anniversary of the movie Bull Durham, Bull City Summer: A Season at the Ballpark. Hunter's contribution would become a separate work entitled “Lights in a Summer Night.” “The artists were chosen because we admired and trusted them,” Stephenson said. “Nobody was given an assignment. The artists were allowed to find themselves within the frame of the ballpark.” The work was exhibited at the North Carolina Museum of Art, Raleigh (2013) and at the Contemporary Art Museum of Raleigh (2013).

Frank Hunter retired from teaching in 2013 and now lives and works in Santa Fe, New Mexico.

== Grants/Awards/Teaching ==
1983 Ohio University: The John Cady Named Graduate Fellowship, 1983

1984 Artist-in-Residency Fellowship from The Issac W. Bernheim Foundation. (Louisville/Clermont, KY, 1984)

1986 Artist in Residence, Kennesaw University, Kennesaw, GA

1986 Artist in Residence, Lightwork, Syracuse, New York

1987-2001 Instructor, Oglethorpe University and Georgia State University

1992 Fulton County Arts Grant, Atlanta, Georgia

1993 Georgia Council for the Arts Grant

2001-2013 Instructor of Photography, Center for Documentary Studies, Duke University

== Selected exhibitions ==
1989 "Frank Hunter: Photographer of the South," Cornell Fine Arts Museum, Rollins College, Winter Park, Florida

1994 "Dick Arentz/Frank Hunter/Chris Rainier" Fahey Klein, Los Angeles, California (April 14-May 14)

1994 "Frank Hunter: Platinum/Palladium Prints." Jackson Fine Art, Atlanta, GA ( - July 31)

1998 "Frank Hunter: Laments," (June 4-July 31) Jackson Fine Art, Atlanta, GA

2000 "Frank Hunter: Still Points," with (June–July)

2003 "Midtown Atlanta at the Millennium," High Museum of Art, Atlanta [photographed 2001]

2003 "Meditations on Light and Place," Solo exhibition, Bank of America Plaza, Atlanta, GA

2004 "Selected Works: State of Georgia Art Collection" (April 17 - June 5) Museum of Contemporary Art of Georgia, Atlanta. (Hunter was one of 17 artists featured in this exhibition of Georgia artists working between years 1938–1990.) See catalog of the exhibition.

2006 "Images in October," Thomas Deans Fine Art, Atlanta, Georgia (October 14-November 14, 2006)

2009 "Nocturnes," Thomas Deans Fine Art (October 15 - November 14) [A solo exhibition of nocturnal landscapes in rural Iowa lit only by the light of billboards]

2010 "Still Point in the Turning World," solo exhibition, Duke University, Durham, NC [The title is a quote from T. S. Eliot's Four Quartets].

2011 “From Polaroid to Impossible: Masterpieces of instant Photography,” Westlicht Collection, Vienna Austria (June 26-August 28)

2013 "Inspired Georgia: 28 Works from Georgia's State Art Collection." Touring exhibition, September 2013-December 2014.

2014 "Bull City Summer," North Carolina Museum of Art, Raleigh, February 23–August 31. "Highlights include.... Frank Hunter's dramatic skyscapes, such as Light in a Summer Night #3, capture the power of nature and the magic of twilight as it settles over the stadium."

2015-2016 "Actual Size: Exploring the Photographic Contact Print," Cassilhaus, Chapel Hill, NC (December 15, 2015 - March 15, 2016) Catalog of the exhibition.

2016 "Director's Cut: Recent Photography Gifts to the North Carolina Museum of Art" (April 4, 2015 – September 13, 2015).

== Collections ==
Frank Hunter's photographs are included in following museums, archives, and private collections (partial listing):

The John and Mable Ringling Museum of Art / The Hunter Museum of American Art / The Museum of Contemporary Art of Georgia / The Museum of Fine Arts, Houston / Denver Art Museum / Mint Museum / Speed Art Museum / High Museum of Art / Kennedy Museum, Ohio University / Eskenazi Museum of Art (Indiana University) / North Carolina Museum of Art / Ackland Art Museum / Asheville Art Museum / Booth Western Art Museum / Georgia Museum of Art / Morris Museum of Art / Akron Art Museum / Florida State University Museum of Fine Art / Fred Jones Jr. Museum of Art / Agnes Scott College / Light Work, Syracuse University / Lamar Dodd Art Center / New Mexico State University / Photographic Archives, University of Louisville / Duke University Archives / El Paso Public Library / State of Georgia, Atlanta / City of Atlanta, Hartsfield International Airport / Columbus Museum of Art / International Polaroid Collection / Cassilhaus Collection / Westlicht Collection. Also: Collection of Allan Gurganus / Collection of Sir Elton John / Collection of Cy Twombly / Collection of E. O. Wilson / Collection of Annie Dillard and Bob Richardson / Collection of Branford Marsalis
