= Frank Marshall (footballer, born 1929) =

English footballer and manager

Personal information
- Date of birth: 26 January 1929
- Place of birth: Sheffield, England
- Date of death: August 2015 (aged 86)
- Place of death: Sweden
- Position: Wing half

Youth career
- Sheffield United

Senior career*
| Years | Team | Apps | (Gls) |
| 19??–1951 | Scarborough | | |
| 1951–1957 | Rotherham United | 117 | (5) |
| 1957–1959 | Scunthorpe United | 80 | (0) |
| 1959–1962 | Doncaster Rovers | 35 | (0) |
| Total | | 232 | (5) |

Managerial career
- 1962: Doncaster Rovers (caretaker)
- 1974–1979: IS Halmia
- 1980–1981: Landskrona BoIS
- * Club domestic league appearances and goals

Frank Marshall (26 January 1929 – August 2015) was an English professional football player and manager.

== Life and career ==
Marshall was born in Sheffield in 1929. After playing youth football for Sheffield United and non-League football for Scarborough, he played in the Football League for Rotherham United, Scunthorpe United and Doncaster Rovers.

While still a player, Marshall became caretaker manager of Doncaster Rovers between March and April 1962. After retiring as a player, Marshall remained on the staff of Doncaster to act as a coach. Marshall later became assistant manager at Mansfield Town, before moving to Sweden, where he managed IS Halmia from 1974 to 1979 and Landskrona BoIS between 1980 and 1981.

Marshall died in Sweden in August 2015 at the age of 86.
