= Franklin the Turtle =

Franklin the Turtle may refer to:

- Franklin the Turtle (books), a series of children's books by Paulette Bourgeois
- Franklin (TV series), a Canadian animated series, based on the books
  - Franklin and Friends, a Canadian CGI-animated series that began in 2011
