= Frankie Barnet =

Frankie Barnet is a Canadian fiction author based in Montreal.

== Life ==
In high school, Barnet wrote skits for class projects. She began writing seriously while she studied Creative Writing at Concordia University. She received her Masters of Fine Arts in fiction from Syracuse University, entering the program in 2016.

Her fiction has been published in Joyland, Event Magazine, PRISM International, Washington Square Review, and the Best Canadian Stories anthology of both 2016 and 2019.

Barnet had a child in 2023 with her husband, the chef, Jacob Spector.

== Works ==
- An Indoor Kind of Girl,, anthology
- Kim: A Novel Idea, graphic novel
- Mood Swings (2024), novel
