= Frank Dueckerhoff =

German ice hockey player

- Born: February 3, 1962 (age 64)
- Height: 6 ft 2 in (188 cm)
- Weight: 194 lb (88 kg; 13 st 12 lb)
- Position: Defence
- Played for: Düsseldorfer EG (DEL)
- NHL draft: Undrafted
- Playing career: 1980–1989

Frank Dueckerhoff (born February 3, 1962) is a German retired professional ice hockey defenceman. He played four seasons with Düsseldorfer EG in the Deutsche Eishockey Liga, from 1980-1985.
