= Frank Kostron =

American politician

Missouri House of Representatives
- Incumbent
- Assumed office 1950

Personal details
- Born: 1916 St. Louis, Missouri
- Died: 1987 (aged 70–71)
- Resting place: Jefferson Barracks National Cemetery
- Party: Democratic
- Spouse: Margaret D. Namentcavage
- Children: 1 daughter
- Occupation: brewery worker

Frank Engelbert Kostron (April 6, 1916 - November 8, 1987) was a Democratic politician who served in the Missouri House of Representatives in the 1950s until the 1970s. He was born in St. Louis, Missouri and was educated at Fremont Grammar School and McKinley High School. On October 31, 1942, he married Margaret Namentcavage in Philadelphia, Pennsylvania. Kostron served in the U.S. Navy between 1934 and 1938 and between 1941 and 1945.
