= Franchesca =

Franchesca is a feminine given name. Notable people with the name include:

- Franchesca Caniguán, Chilean footballer
- Franchesca Floirendo, Filipina actress, host and model
- Franchesca Ramsey, American comedian, activist, television and YouTube personality, and actress
- Franchesca Salcedo, Filipino actress
- Jenilca Franchesca Giusti, Puerto Rican singer, songwriter and actress

== See also ==
- Francesca
