= Frank Grevil =

Danish former intelligence agent (born 1960)

Frank Søholm Grevil (born 1960) is a Danish chemical engineer and former intelligence agent. He held the rank of major in Forsvarets Efterretningstjeneste, the Danish military intelligence agency. On 22 February 2004 he acted as a whistle blower leaking classified information about the FE's assessment of the possibility of weapons of mass destruction in Iraq. The analysis of FE concluded that there was no certain information about operational weapons of mass destruction. This was not aligned with the statement of Danish prime minister Anders Fogh Rasmussen to the Danish parliament that there was evidence that Iraq had weapons of mass destruction.

== Information ==
For leaking the documents Frank Grevil was sentenced to four months in prison, which he served in Horserød State Prison.

In 2009, he received the Sam Adams Award for integrity in intelligence which had earlier been given to Katharine Gun and Andrew Wilkie.

In December 2010 Grevil signed a declaration of support for WikiLeaks. Among others on the list were Daniel Ellsberg and Colleen Rowley.
