= Frank Senger =

German politician (born 1986)

Member of the Landtag of Rhineland-Palatinate
- Incumbent
- Assumed office 18 May 2026

Personal details
- Born: 1986 (age 39–40)
- Party: Alternative for Germany (since 2023)

Frank Senger (born 1986) is a German politician serving as a member of the Landtag of Rhineland-Palatinate since 2026. He has served as deputy group leader of the Alternative for Germany since 2026.
