= Frank Jump =

American photographer and writer

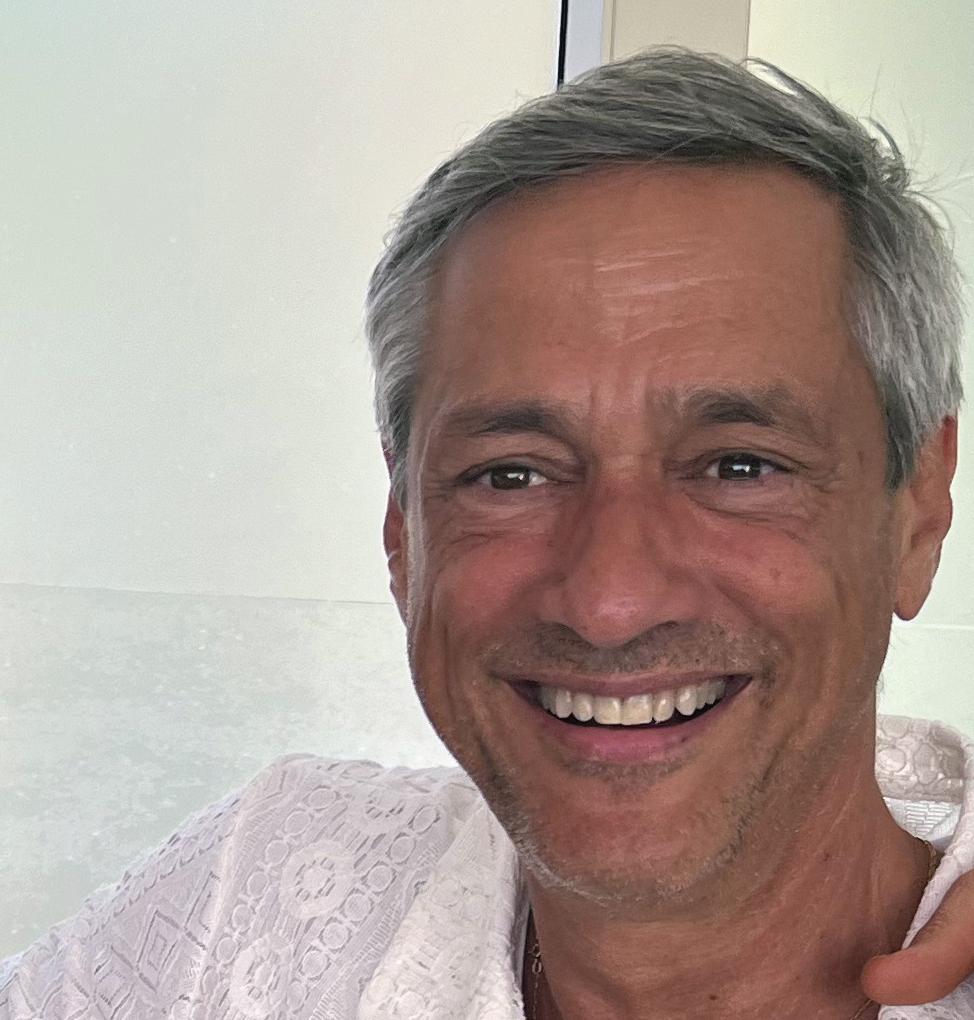
- Jump in 2024
- Born: 1960 (age 65–66)
- Occupation: Urban photographer
- Notable work: Fading Ads of New York City
- Website: https://www.frankjump.com/

Frank Jump (born 1960) is an American urban photographer and author. He is best known for his work Fading Ads of New York City, which documents ghost signs in New York City.

== Education ==
In 1998, Jump received his interdisciplinary B.A. in Music, Theatre and Film at Empire State College. Jump's first Masters in Education (MEd) was received at Brooklyn College in 2003 through the New York City Teaching Fellows and his second Masters in Instructional Technology (MEd) was received at Touro College in 2005.

== Fading Ads of New York City ==
Jump's book, Fading Ads of New York City, is a collection of 84 of his photographs of what he calls "fading ads," old fading advertisements on the sides of New York City buildings. The book was published by History Press in 2011. He began the series of photographs in 1997 for a documentary photography class with Mel Rosenthal at SUNY/Empire State College, after photographing a Harlem ghost sign for Omega Oil, an old cure-all tonic. His work was originally exhibited at the New York Historical Society in 1998, and helped him secure publication of the book with History Press. Jump has published some of the photographs on his blog.

The photographs were taken using Kodachrome film. Their presentation in the book is interspersed with personal essays written by Jump and other contributors, drawing connections between the fading ads, the passage of time, mortality, and Jump's own experiences living with HIV through the AIDS crisis. In the foreword to Fading Ads, Dr. Andrew Irving, a visual anthropologist at the University of Manchester, discusses Jump's work as urban archaeology showing how New York City evolved over time, and draws connections with the AIDS crisis. The book inspired a series published by Arcadia Press documenting fading advertisements in other major American cities. WNYC referred to Jump as an "acclaimed photographer".

== Personal life ==
Jump is a retired technology teacher from a NYC public school in Flatbush, Brooklyn. He was diagnosed as HIV positive in 1986. He was a founding member of the AIDS activist group ACT UP and was interviewed for the ACT UP Oral History Project. Jump married his long-term partner Vincenzo Aiosa in February 2004 in Toronto Canada. He is an uncle to actress Rosario Dawson.
