= Frankie (Italian Roulette) =

- Directed by: Francesco Mazza
- Written by: Francesco Mazza, Amos Poe
- Produced by: Giovanna Levy
- Starring: Francesco Mazza; Olan Montgomery; Christina Toth
- Cinematography: Niramon Ross
- Music by: Luca Tozzi
- Release date: 2015
- Running time: 17 minutes
- Countries: United States, Italy
- Language: English

Frankie (Italian Roulette) is a 2015 short film written and directed by Francesco Mazza, who also acts as the main character. The film was co-written by the New York-based director Amos Poe.

It depicts the story of Italian immigrant Frankie Tramonto, struggling to survive in modern New York City among improbable dates, typical Italian food and a shady immigration lawyer who forces him to confront with a dark choice in order to stay in the U.S.

== Awards and nomination ==
- Nominated "Best Short" at Nastro D'Argento 2016 (cinquina finalista) (Rome, Italy)
- Winner "Best Short" at Oaxaca Film Fest in 2015 (Oaxaca, Mexico)
- Winner "Audience Award" at Short Cut Film Festival in 2015 (Chicago, USA)
- Official selection at DC Short Film Festival (Washington DC, USA)
- Official selection at Big Apple Film Festival in 2015 (New York, USA)
- Official selection at Lone Star Film Festival in 2015 (Fort Worth, USA)
- Official selection at Crossroads Film Festival in 2016 (Jackson, USA)
- Official selection at New York Independent Film Festival in 2016 (New York, USA)
- Official selection at Big Island Film Festival in 2016 (Hawaii, USA)
- Official selection at Arlington International Film Festival in 2016
- Official selection at Long Island Film Festival in 2016
- Official selection for the Short Film Day 2015 at Centro Internazionale del Corto
