= Franklin Stanwood =

American painter

Franklin Stanwood (March 16, 1852 – June 20, 1888) was an American artist from Maine.

Stanwood was born at the Portland Alms House in 1852 and immediately adopt by Capt. Gideon Stanwood of Gorham. He was educated in the Portland Public Schools. He eventually became a sailor and later a painter. He was known for painting nautical themes as well as house portraits.

Stanwood died of tuberculosis at the age of 36 and is interred at Western Cemetery in Portland.

== Other reading ==
- Chance, James. "Charles Dickens and Franklin Stanwood." The Dickensian, vol. 110, no. 494, 2014, pp. 201.
