= Gaza Humanitarian Foundation =

US and Israeli-backed organization

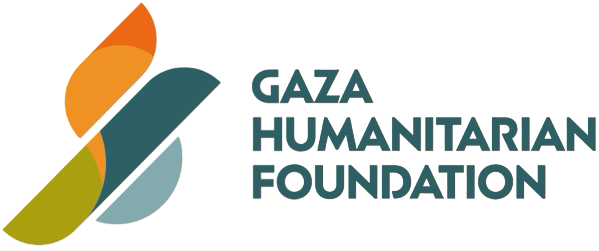
- Abbreviation: GHF
- Formation: February 2025
- Defunct: November 24, 2025 (suspended operations October 10)
- Type: Nonprofit organization
- Legal status: Inactive
- Purpose: Food security in the Gaza Strip
- Headquarters: Delaware, United States
- Region served: Gaza Strip
- Members: 300 contractors
- Executive chairman: Johnnie Moore Jr.
- Executive director: John Acree
- Expenses: $140 million/month
- Website: https://ghf.org (archived)

The Gaza Humanitarian Foundation (GHF) was an organization backed by the Israeli and American governments with the stated purpose of distributing humanitarian aid amid the ongoing famine and humanitarian crisis resulting from the Israeli blockade of the Gaza Strip. It was established in February 2025, suspended operations in October 2025, and closed in November 2025. Intended to bypass the United Nations as the main supplier of aid in Gaza, GHF began operating in May 2025 as a response to fraudulent Israeli claims that aid was being routinely diverted by Hamas. Aid organizations including the UN have denied these claims and attributed the aid theft to Palestinian groups armed by the Israeli military. The GHF has been criticized by the United Nations and humanitarian groups for politicizing aid distribution, with established humanitarian groups saying the GHF is giving cover for Israel to pursue its aims to depopulate Palestinians from the Gaza Strip and use starvation as a weapon of war.

There were repeated mass killings in the vicinity of GHF distribution sites. As of 15 August 2025, the UN Office of the High Commissioner for Human Rights (OHCHR) reported that of the 1,760 Palestinians killed since 27 May while seeking food, 994 were killed in the vicinity of GHF sites. The attacks at GHF sites were attributed to Israel Defense Forces (IDF) by the OHCHR, Gaza officials, and witnesses. US contractors with the GHF were also filmed shooting Palestinian civilians, and according to former staff, its organizational culture dehumanized aid seekers and imposed few controls on the behavior of contractors. The GHF and the IDF repeatedly denied responsibility for deaths at aid sites, saying that only warning shots were fired. Survivors of the repeated mass killings perpetrated at the distribution sites began to refer to the Israeli-backed operation as traps or death traps rather than aid. Doctors Without Borders described the conditions around these distributions as "slaughter masquerading as aid" and "orchestrated killing". The Center for Constitutional Rights and 14 other human rights organizations warned that the GHF could be liable for complicity in war crimes, crimes against humanity, and genocide against Palestinians. Critics referred to the mass killings at GHF sites as the "hunger games", in reference to the American media franchise.

The United Nations and other aid groups refused to cooperate with the GHF and accused them of politicizing and "weaponizing aid", and delivering it in a manner that is unsafe and degrading for the Palestinian people. The United Nations and over 170 charities and NGOs, including Save the Children and Oxfam, accused the GHF of failing to uphold and violating humanitarian norms by forcing two million Palestinians into overcrowded and militarized zones and subjecting aid-seekers to almost daily attacks; they demanded that the GHF be immediately closed.

GHF was led by executive director John Acree, a former USAID manager, and executive chairman Johnnie Moore, an American evangelical leader and businessman. GHF's operations were suspended following the October 2025 Gaza ceasefire. A spokesperson for the group described an intent to resume operations. In November 2025, the GHF announced the permanent end of its operations in Gaza, saying that they "succeeded in their mission of showing there's a better way to deliver aid to Gazans."

== Background ==
Due to Israeli checkpoints into Gaza, the Israeli government and IDF have controlled the entrance of humanitarian aid into Gaza, with aid delivery disrupted multiple times over the years, either via Israeli government blockades or Israeli civilian actions. On 2 March 2025, Israel instituted a blockade on the Gaza Strip denying entry of food, water, medical supplies, shelter, and fuel with the stated aim of pressuring Hamas to release hostages. The blockade raised concerns about famine from the Integrated Food Security Phase Classification (IPC). In early May, the United States government confirmed reports of a planned aid distribution system led by the newly registered Gaza Humanitarian Foundation, with security provided by private contractors and the Israeli military. On 19 May, aid trucks entered Gaza for the first time since the blockade following a statement by Israel allowing the entry of a "basic amount of food". The Gaza Humanitarian Foundation began distributing aid on 26 May.

According to a report by The New York Times, the idea of an Israeli-backed private food distribution program was discussed in December 2023. Throughout 2024, Israeli officials worked with private American security contractors, primarily CIA veteran Philip Reilly, to develop a plan. Reilly later launched the security company Safe Reach Solutions (SRS) in January 2025, which was tasked with securing food distribution sites in Gaza. SRS is owned by a trust based in Wyoming whose beneficiary is McNally Capital, a private equity firm founded in 2008 by Ward McNally. Boston Consulting Group also helped to set up GHF, signing multiple contracts with McNally Capital to assist SRS, though it later withdrew from the project. Israeli Prime Minister Benjamin Netanyahu has stated that the foundation was an initiative that originated in Israel.

== Organization ==
The Gaza Humanitarian Foundation was registered in February 2025 in Delaware with a contingency filing in Geneva that was being wound down. Former CEO of World Central Kitchen Nate Mook was described as a board member on early GHF documents, but has stated that he is not on the board.

Starting on 12 June 2025, former USAID official John Acree began serving as the group's interim director. According to Acree, "The demand for food is relentless, and so is our commitment…We're adjusting our operations in real time to keep people safe and informed, and we stand ready to partner with other organizations to scale up and deliver more meals to the people of Gaza."

On 3 June, American evangelical leader and businessman Johnnie Moore Jr. was appointed executive chairman of GHF. Moore had previously praised Donald Trump's proposal to take over the Gaza Strip, having stated that "The USA will take full responsibility for [the] future of Gaza, giving everyone hope and a future."

The plan would have used a small number of distribution hubs, mostly in southern Gaza, secured by the Israeli military and private US-based contractors, without the aid of IDF soldiers. The US ambassador to Israel Mike Huckabee indicated to reporters that IDF troops would be stationed "at a distance" from the hubs for additional protection. The plan was similar to earlier plans by the Israeli military, and contrasted with models by the UN and other international agencies which involved hundreds of smaller distribution points throughout the Gaza strip.

Aid officials said they would screen people for involvement with Hamas militants, perhaps using facial recognition or biometric technology.

The stations were designed to distribute aid only once or twice a month at specific locations, with aid being described as pre-packaged rations, hygiene kits, and medical supplies. The proposal indicated that each meal was budgeted around $1.30 which would include procurement and distribution costs.

In June 2025, Boston Consulting Group (BCG) terminated its contract with the GHF. BCG helped create the GHF in coordination with Israel and was responsible for setting prices for contractors. BCG said that the work was done pro bono but The Washington Post reported that BCG submitted invoices of over $1 million per month. BCG fired two senior partners, calling the work they oversaw for GHF "unauthorized".

In early July 2025, Swiss authorities ordered the GHF office in Geneva to be closed for noncompliance with legal requirements to continue its operations.

=== Executive director transition ===
Jake Wood, the initial executive director, is a former US marine and co-founder of disaster relief agency Team Rubicon. On 25 May 2025, Wood announced that he was stepping down because it was impossible to meet the foundation's objectives while "strictly adhering to the humanitarian principles of humanity, neutrality, impartiality and independence, which I will not abandon." Wood said that he "unequivocally ... will not be part of anything that forcibly dislocates or displaces the Palestinian population." He also called on Israel to allow significantly more aid to enter Gaza through all pathways and for such aid to be allowed in without diversion or discrimination, while also calling on Hamas to release the hostages. The GHF said its operations would begin without Wood, and that it would be feeding more than one million Palestinians within a week.

=== Program characteristics ===
The program – known as the "Humanitarian Aid Distribution Program in the Gaza Strip" – was a joint American-Israeli program by the GHF designed to facilitate the entry and distribution of humanitarian aid (such as food, medicine, and supplies) to the civilian population in the Gaza Strip, in response to the eleven week blockade of food entry into Gaza imposed by Israel. The United States and Israel said distributing aid through the GHF would prevent Hamas from stealing aid. The UN said that Hamas stealing aid was not a widespread affair. Hamas said that it had not stolen aid.

==== Operations ====
GHF distribution sites in Gaza as of July 2025

Three GHF distribution sites were in Rafah, in areas where the IDF had issued evacuation warnings, and one is in Gaza City. As of 29 May 2025, no distribution sites had been built north of the Netzarim Corridor. In July 2025, GHF said that it had created separate lanes for women and children and was increasing programs for direct aid delivery to communities. On 6 August 2025, U.S. ambassador to Israel Mike Huckabee announced plans to "scale up" the number of distribution sites from four to sixteen and begin to operate them 24 hours a day.

The facilities were secured by American contractors and monitored by the Israel Defense Forces (IDF) from a distance.

The assistance primarily consisted of boxes of food. Israeli authorities said that the aid included flour, baby food, and medical supplies. A 13 June report on Devex said that GHF boxes do not provide fuel, water, sanitation, shelter, or health care. Palestinians interviewed by Middle East Eye described the boxes provided by the GHF as inadequate, saying that the boxes did not contain supplies such as bottled water, cooking fuel, medicines, blankets, baby formula, or baby food. The BBC reported that GHF boxes primarily contained dry foods that required fuel and water to cook, despite Gaza undergoing a water crisis, and some ready-to-eat foods. The GHF said that each box contained 42,500 calories, and would feed 5.5 people for 3.5 days. Sources interviewed by the BBC said that the boxes lacked nutrients such as calcium, zinc, and iron, and could lead to an increased risk of anemia and scurvy.

By the end of its first day of operations, GHF reported that it had distributed 8,000 food boxes, estimated to feed 44,000 people for half a week — covering about 2% of Gaza's population. On 12 June, it reported a daily distribution of 2.6 million meals, the highest daily output since the start of its operations. GHF originally calculated meals to contain 1,750 calories (7,300 kilojoules), and this calculation was raised to 2,500 calories (10,000 kJ) in June; the World Health Organization, UNICEF, and World Food Programme set a standard of 2,100 calories (8,800 kJ) per day in emergency situations. Alex de Waal estimates that the GHF's distribution work covers less than half of Gaza's nutrition needs.

=== Funding ===
GHF has not released information on its funding sources. On 6 June 2025, Reuters reported that the U.S. State Department was considering sending $500 million from the United States Agency for International Development (USAID) to the GHF. On 11 June, Mike Huckabee said that at the time, GHF was not being mostly funded by the US. Huckabee stated that the organization's funding sources included other countries, NGOs, humanitarian funds, and private individuals, all of which retained anonymity by request. On 26 June, the U.S. State Department announced that it had approved $30 million in funding for the GHF, calling it "the latest iteration of President Trump's and Secretary Rubio's pursuit of peace in the region". At the time of the announcement, $7 million had already been disbursed to GHF by the State Department, according to The Guardian. At the time of the GHF’s suspension on operations following the October 10 Gaza ceasefire deal, the GHF had funding until November 2025.

== History ==
The Foundation began operations 26 May 2025 at a new distribution centre in Rafah.

The centers run by GHF in June 2025 were Tal al-Sultan, the Saudi neighbourhood, Khan Younis and Wadi Gaza. They replaced some 400 United Nations distribution points. The GHF centers lie in evacuation zones, areas where Palestinians were ordered to leave before and which they have to re-enter to get aid. People seeking aid are not allowed to approach the centers before they open. The opening of the centers itself is infrequently announced online, often only minutes before the actual opening. The time span in which the centers are open decreased over time and was given for June 2025 as low as 11 minutes per day.

Following the declaration of ceasefire on October 10, 2025, the Associated Press reported that some GHF sites had been abandoned. A GHF spokesperson said the sites were undergoing "temporary closures." The end of operations was announced in November.

== Killings and other access incidents ==
From 27 May to 9 October 2025, amid a famine in the Gaza Strip, more than 2,600 Palestinian civilians seeking aid were killed and thousands more were wounded when being fired upon by the Israel Defense Forces (IDF), armed gangs, and contractors hired by the Gaza Humanitarian Foundation (GHF). Most of the deadly incidents occurred in the vicinity of short-lived aid distribution sites operated by the US- and Israeli-backed GHF.

The killings began taking place on the first day of the GHF's operations, following an 11-week Israeli blockade since early March 2025 that had severely restricted humanitarian aid to Gaza, exacerbating the Gaza humanitarian crisis. On 31 July 2025, the Office of the United Nations High Commissioner for Human Rights (OHCHR) reported that, as of 31 July, at least 1,373 Palestinian aid seekers were killed: 859 near GHF's sites and 514 near UN and other organizations' aid convoys. On 5 July, the Gaza Health Ministry reported that at least 743 Palestinians were killed and over 4,891 injured; and earlier, on 1 July, the Ministry noted that around 70% of dead victims were killed at GHF sites. Critics have referred to the regular mass killings at GHF distribution sites as the "hunger games" in reference to the American media franchise.

The American non-profit the Center for Constitutional Rights believes the GHF could potentially be legally liable for complicity in war crimes, crimes against humanity, and genocide against Palestinians. Amnesty International says that evidence it has gathered suggests that the GHF's purpose is "to placate international concerns while constituting another tool of Israel’s genocide". The United Nations and over 170 charities and NGOs, including Save the Children and Oxfam, accuse the GHF of failure to uphold and even violating humanitarian norms by forcing two million Palestinians into overcrowded and militarised zones and subjecting aid-seekers to almost daily attacks. Additionally, those organisations, later joined by Human Rights Watch, demanded that the GHF and its aid distribution system be closed immediately.

In late June 2025, Haaretz reported that IDF troops had received orders to fire on the unarmed crowds to "keep them away from food distribution centers". Israeli Prime Minister Benjamin Netanyahu and Defense Minister Israel Katz denied these claims, calling the Haaretz report a "blood libel." American security contractors such as Safe Reach Solutions (SRS) had reportedly also been firing live ammunition and lobbing stun grenades at Palestinians seeking aid. A former GHF worker said that he witnessed the IDF shooting indiscriminately at Palestinian civilians. Amidst a ceasefire implemented on 10 October, officials announced that GHF sites in the Strip would be temporarily shut down.

On 12 June 2025, the GHF reported that a bus carrying about two dozen Palestinian GHF workers was attacked by Hamas, killing at least 8 and causing multiple injuries. Social media within Gaza said that Hamas targeted the bus because it was transporting GHF employees linked to anti-Hamas militant leader Yasser Abu Shabab. Referring to the bus event, Al-Khazindar Company, a Palestinian group that works with GHF, said that Hamas militants had targeted its workers and killed eight in its attack. The company director said that Hamas had threatened the killed workers and that his other workers had been beaten and shot. Hamas said that they had killed 12 members of the Israeli-backed Popular Forces militia.

GHF said they do not work with the Abu Shabab group and that its staff includes unarmed Palestinian workers as well as armed international contractors, who are mostly American and guard the centers. The Abu Shabab group said on Facebook that its members were not targeted by Hamas in the bus attack. The bus attack occurred after Hamas issued a warning in the prior week that any individual or company in cooperation with GHF would receive "decisive and uncompromising action." Hamas reiterated the warning on 8 June, saying it had commanded its forces to strike those in cooperation with the GHF. GHF also said that members of Hamas had intimidated Nasser Hospital staff from treating the wounded aid workers.

US contractors with the GHF were anonymously reported by their own colleagues for shooting at starving Palestinians who had come to receive aid or were on their way back. In a video provided to the Associated Press, contractors can be heard shooting at, and celebrating hitting, Palestinians. A former security contractor told the same to the BBC, highlighting that his colleagues would fire with machine guns at people posing them no threat. He said the culture at the GHF imposes no rules or controls on the behavior of contractors, that they are encouraged to shoot first and ask questions later, and that they refer to Palestinians as "zombie hordes."

As of 28 June 2025, more than 500 Palestinians have been killed while seeking food since the GHF began distributing aid. Witnesses say Israeli troops have opened fire on crowds as they head toward the aid distribution sites.

On 5 July, two U.S. aid workers were injured after two alleged militants threw grenades at the GHF aid center in Khan Yunis. The GHF blamed Hamas for the attack. GHF said the hand grenades were filled with ball bearings and released a photo of the grenade fragments with ball bearings. Witnesses interviewed by Mondoweiss said that the grenades were stun grenades in particular and that US contractors had thrown grenades at Palestinian aid seekers, who tossed the grenades back before they detonated.

On 16 July, the GHF for the first time acknowledged an occurrence of Palestinian deaths at one of their distribution sites, a crowd crush which killed at least 20 people. The GHF said that Hamas affiliates had "deliberately fomented the unrest"; Gaza officials and witnesses said that chaos broke out following the use of crowd control measures by aid site workers.

On 21 July, a joint statement calling for the Gaza War to immediately end by the foreign ministers of Australia, Austria, Belgium, Canada, Denmark, Estonia, Finland, France, Iceland, Ireland, Italy, Japan, Latvia, Lithuania, Luxembourg, The Netherlands, New Zealand, Norway, Poland, Portugal, Slovenia, Spain, Sweden, Switzerland, the United Kingdom, and the European Union Commissioner for Equality, Preparedness and Crisis Management said the Israeli aid distribution model "is dangerous, fuels instability and deprives Gazans of human dignity".

On 24 July, at the Saudi district aid site, the GHF held a distribution in which only women were allowed to come and receive aid. According to witnesses interviewed by the BBC, chaos at the site prevented GHF workers from unloading aid, who then began using pepper spray and stun grenades on aid seekers. The BBC reported that two women were shot and killed on that day. A sister of one of the women killed said that Israeli troops had fired warning shots at them, and that her sister was hit in the neck while moving back from the troops. The IDF said that they only fired warning shots and were unaware of any casualties. The GHF denied that there were any incidents or fatalities on that day.

The GHF and the IDF have repeatedly denied responsibility for deaths at aid sites, saying that only warning shots have been fired.

=== Whistleblower television interviews ===
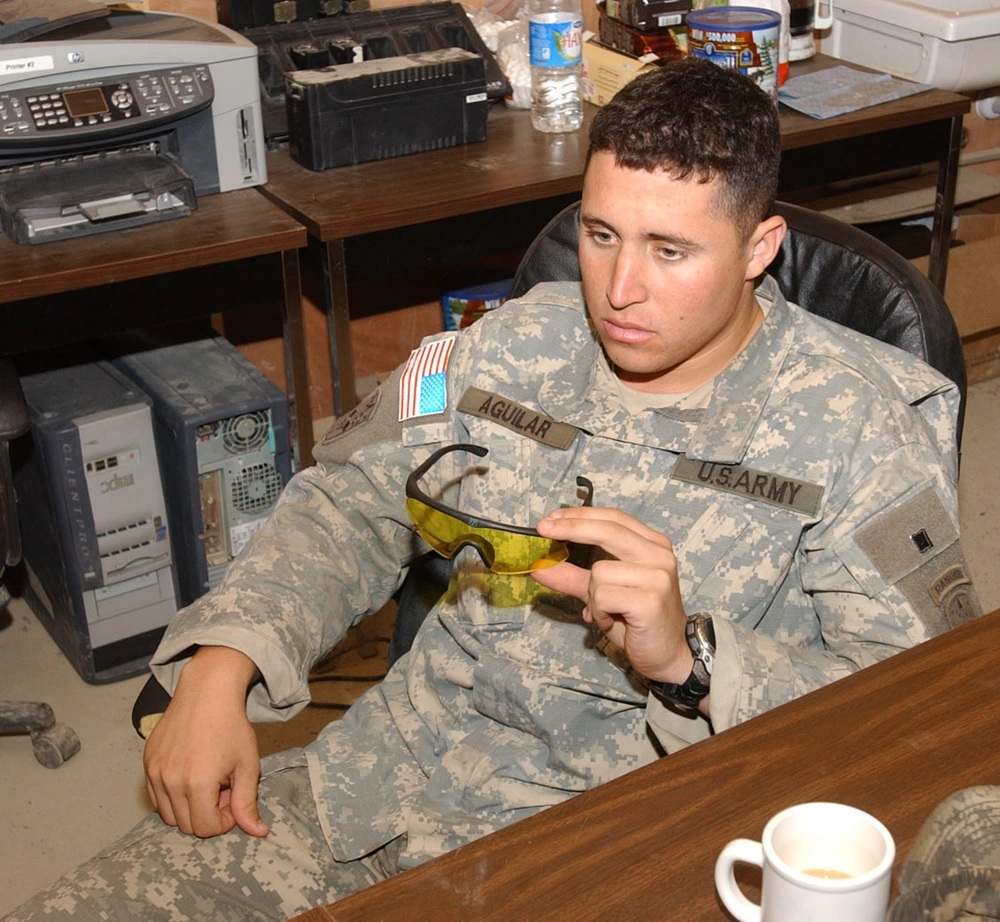
Aguilar during his time in the U.S. Army, 2006

On 26 July, the BBC interviewed Anthony Aguilar, a retired United States Army Special Forces lieutenant colonel and former GHF contractor through UG Solutions. Aguilar said that he left the GHF after witnessing fellow contractors and IDF soldiers killing civilians, including firing a Merkava tank round and mortar rounds on crowds. Aguilar described what he witnessed as "war crimes". The GHF called Aguilar's allegations "categorically false" and described him as a "disgruntled employee who was terminated for misconduct", which he denied. GHF has also accused Aguilar of falsifying documents to spread a false narrative. Aguilar told US Senator Chris Van Hollen that he was ordered by an IDF soldier to shoot at children and when he refused was told by a superior that the GHF worked for the IDF.

On 21 August 2025, CBS News broadcast a report based on another whistleblower. This also reported indiscriminate shooting "of anything alive" by both IDF and American security personnel. American security contractors would boast about how many people (not combatants) and birds they had killed.

=== Infidels Motorcycle Club ===
In September 2025 it was reported that at least ten identified members of the openly anti-Muslim "Infidels Motorcycle Club", including its leader, Johnny Mulford, were employed by UG Solutions as armed security for GHF in Gaza, with a further 30 members recruited from the gang, according to one former contractor. Armed contractors were photographed in Gaza with tattoos of "1095", the year that Pope Urban II launched the First Crusade, and banners stating, "FOB Mar-a-Lago," and "Make Gaza Great Again." Edward Ahmed Mitchell, deputy director of the Council on American–Islamic Relations, said: "Putting the Infidels biker club in charge of delivering humanitarian aid in Gaza is like putting the KKK in charge of delivering humanitarian aid in Sudan. It makes no sense whatsoever."

== Reception ==
Despite Israel's claims that an alternative distribution pathway is needed as Hamas allegedly steals aid, UN officials have said the looting of Gaza aid has nothing to do with Hamas. An internal USAID analysis also found "no reports alleging Hamas" benefited from aid from American sources (spokespersons for the US government dispute the validity of the analysis). Israeli military officials also anonymously told The New York Times that there is no evidence that Hamas has engaged in aid theft. Aid workers have stated that looting is instead being performed by the Popular Forces, an ISIS-linked anti-Hamas militia supported and armed by Israel. Israeli opposition leader Yair Lapid suggested that the GHF and the American Safe Reach Solutions (SRS) are shell companies used to hide Israeli government funding.

The GHF's operation has been criticized for "[distracting] from what is actually needed" by a OCHA spokesman. The UN and many other aid groups refuse to cooperate with the GHF and accuse them of "weaponizing aid". United Nations aid chief Tom Fletcher raised doubts about the humanitarian aspect of the foundation and concerns about Israel's involvement and intentions. Fletcher called the foundation a "fig leaf for further violence and displacement" for Palestinians in Gaza and a "deliberate distraction" to the ongoing issues within Gaza due to the war. Fletcher said that the plan makes aid conditional on Israel's political and military aims, and "makes starvation a bargaining chip". A UNICEF spokesperson said of the GHF after repeated mass shooting of starving Palestinians at distribution sites that, "These are not humanitarians, they are people with guns." UNICEF has also noted that the aid boxes weigh 20 kilograms (44 lb) and must be carried by hand, which potentially excludes weak and injured people.

European Union foreign policy chief Kaja Kallas condemned the GHF plan, stating that "humanitarian aid cannot be weaponized" and that most of the aid sent by Europe to Gaza is "behind the borders and is not reaching people".

TRIAL International, a Swiss NGO which supports victims of war crimes, asked the Swiss government to investigate whether GHF's aid plan complied with Swiss and international humanitarian law. TRIAL said the GHF's plan was not neutral and would result in forced displacement of Gazans. GHF is a registered non-profit in Switzerland and Delaware. GHF said it would move all its operations to the United States after the Swiss government said it was not in compliance with rules for foundations registered in Switzerland. GHF said its "Swiss entity was created as a contingency; is not operational; and is being wound down". Switzerland is investigating GHF.

U.S. Senator Elizabeth Warren requested that Marco Rubio disclose whether he plans to award funds to the GHF. Warren described the GHF as "an alarming departure from the professional humanitarian organizations that have worked on the ground, in Gaza and elsewhere, for decades".

On 1 July, a joint declaration titled GAZA: Starvation or Gunfire - This is Not a Humanitarian Response was published by Save the Children, calling for the GHF food aid distribution scheme in Gaza to be dismantled, citing concerns that it put civilians at risk of injury and death. The declaration was signed by 171 NGOs, including Oxfam, Doctors Without Borders, Amnesty International and the Norwegian Refugee Council. The declaration called on countries to press Israel to halt GHF's distribution and reinstate the coordination of aid by the United Nations.

Amnesty International's gathered evidence suggests that the GHF's purpose is "to placate international concerns while constituting another tool of Israel's genocide". Alex de Waal considers the GHF a way for Israel to obtain an alibi while the starvation of the Palestinian population deepens.

In August 2025, Brooke Goldstein, Xaviaer DuRousseau and other American and Israeli social media influencers went on a paid trip to Gaza by Israel's diaspora affairs ministry to film and share content from GHF distribution sites. Brooke Goldstein wrote: "What I saw proved that what the media is reporting about the situation is absolutely false. The GHF's mission is to feed the people of Gaza in a way that Hamas can't steal the food, and it's working."

=== Allegations of contaminated aid ===
On 27 June 2025, Gaza's Government Media Office expressed its "deep concern and condemnation" over its discovery of Oxycodone "narcotic pills" inside flour bags distributed by GHF aid centers in Gaza. It said it held Israel fully responsible for the "heinous crime of spreading addiction and destroying the Palestinian social fabric" and stated "We have so far documented four testimonies from citizens who found these pills inside flour bags. More serious is the possibility that some of these narcotic substances were deliberately ground or dissolved in the flour itself, which raises the scope of the crime and transforms it into a serious attack directly targeting public health." In a response, the GHF said "The flour we distribute is commercially packaged and not produced or handled by GHF staff. We have safety protocols that include any box of aid that has been opened prior to distribution can't be given out." An analysis by Snopes said that they did not have enough evidence to assess the veracity of the claim.

== See also ==
- Attacks on protected zones and civilians in Gaza
- Gaza genocide
- Gaza humanitarian crisis (2023–present)
