= Franklin Reytor =

Cuban musician

- Born: Franklin Darien Reytor; 1982 (age 43–44); Santiago, Cuba
- Education: Conservatorio Esteban Salas
- Occupations: Musician, Composer, Producer, Teacher

Franklin Darien Reytor (born 1982) is a Cuban guitarist, composer, producer, and music teacher.

He was born and raised in Santiago de Cuba; he studied classical guitar and graduated with multiple honors from the "Conservatorio Esteban Salas" in 2001. Aguilar, know primarily for being a virtuoso with the "cuban tres" guitar, has also played and worked on various musical projects as a prominent composer, instrumentalist, arranger and musical producer. Many of which have been nominated and subsequently won awards in the acclaimed festival "Cubadisco". He has toured Internationally throughout the world and participated in numerous distinguished festivals among them, the "World Music Festival" in the city of Oslo, accompanying Eva Grinan with the notable "Orquesta de Camara de Noruega".

== Awards ==
- Great Award of the 3rd Electo Rosell "Chepin" competition, in the year 2015, for the work "Cubano de pura cepa" performed by the "Son Palmera" Group
- Special Mention at the XXIX Nosside World Poetry Award 2013, for the work "Sonando Contigo". The Nosside World Poetry Award is the only global, multilingual and multimedia competition, for unpublished poetry, never awarded at any other competition. It is open to all languages of the world, and to any type of imaginary poetic expression: written poetry, videos (poetry video-clips), and music (original songs), and hundreds of artists from all over the world participate each year
- Award of the Santiago de Cuba Carnival Song Competition, in the year 2013, with the work "No hay otra igual". The competition is organized every year by the Santiago de Cuba Carnival organizing committee, calling for artists from all over the country to select the song which will represent the Carnival
- First Place at the 2nd Electo Rosell "Chepin" Competition in the year 2010, for the bolero-son "De espaldas al cielo", performed by the "Granma Group"
- Third Place at the Electo Rosell "Chepin" Competition in the year 2007, for the bolero "Restos de una vida", performed by the "Granma Group". The Electo Rosell "Chepin" Competition is a national event, organized by the UNEAC of Santiago de Cuba, in which a great number of musical artists from all over the country participate
- Great Award of dance music at the "Adolfo Guzman" Competition in the year 2007, for the work "La Arana", performed by Pedro Lugo "El Nene" and the orchestra assigned to the event
- Great Award at the tres players competition of the "Matamoros Son" Festival in Santiago de Cuba, in the year 2004

== International Tours ==
- Norway 2010 - Shows with singer Eva Grinan and the "Norway Chamber Orchestra" at the Oslo World Music Festival, during the month of November.
- Canada 2007 - Shows with the "Granma Group" at the Kola Note club in the city of Montreal, per work contract for the month of September.
- England 2006 - Shows with the "Contemporary Septet" at the Floridita Bar-restaurant in the city of London, per work contract; and two shows at private parties in the Anglo-Norman Island of Guernsey during the months of October and November.
- England 2006 - Shows with the "Contemporary Septet" at the Floridita Bar-restaurant in the city of London, per work contract during the month of May.

== Notable Songs ==
- Cuban Through and Through [Para Tenerla an Ella] (2015)
- There is no Other Alike [No Hay Otro Igual] (2011)
- Dreaming About You [Sonado Contigo] (2010)
- With My Back Towards Heaven [De Espalda al Cielo] (2009)
- The Spider [LA Arana] (2005)
- Leftovers of a Life [Restos de una Vida] (2004)
