= Bookitbee =

Bookitbee is a United Kingdom online events booking system which allows users to sell tickets and promote events. The system was designed to give small events the same access to professional ticketing and promotional services as their larger counterparts.

The company was founded in 2012 and is headquartered in Penshurst, Kent. Revenue is created by charging a percentage of ticket sales.

== Founders ==
Bookitbee was founded by Kenton Ward (CEO) and Frank Di Mauro in October 2012. Prior to founding Bookitbee, both Ward and Di Mauro were involved in the creation of Compound Partners Ltd. Di Mauro has been the owner of DMI Creative since 1998 and holds a BSC in Architecture Planning & Building from University College London. Ward has previously worked as the managing director of Touch Associates Limited and as Head of Strategic Accounts at Squiz. He holds a BA Hons in International Business Management with Russian from Northumbria University.

== Funding ==
The firm has received funding in the past from Jenson Solutions. In early 2016, Bookitbee secured a new funding deal with ARC InterCapital. The deal includes private funding from Jenson Solutions and government body, Scottish Enterprise.

== Products ==
Bookitbee has a web-based app which can be used to manage events and to check in attendees; it is compatible with mobile browsers.

== Competition ==
Bookitbee offers its services as a self-service platform or offers "Full Service Ticketing" with additional managed services for larger event organisers.
