= Franklin Cohen =

American clarinetist

Franklin Cohen (born July 28, 1946) is an American clarinetist, best known for his tenure of 39 seasons as Principal Clarinet of the Cleveland Orchestra. He currently holds the title of Principal Clarinet Emeritus, the first orchestra member to receive an emeritus status.

== Career ==
Cohen gave more than 200 soloist performances with the orchestra, including at Carnegie Hall under Vladimir Ashkenazy. His Deutsche Grammophon recording of Debussy's Première rhapsodie conducted by Pierre Boulez received two Grammy Awards in 1996, and he was the first clarinetist to win the ARD International Music Competition, in 1968. He is also a co-founder of ChamberFest Cleveland, a summer chamber music festival, and is head of the Clarinet Department at the Cleveland Institute of Music. He has recorded, for Decca Records, a disc of Brahms and Schumann with Vladimir Ashkenazy at the piano, the Mozart Clarinet Concerto with conductor Christoph von Dohnányi, and the Brahms Clarinet Trio with Ashkenazy and cellist Stephen Geber.
