= Franklin Webster (publisher) =

American publisher

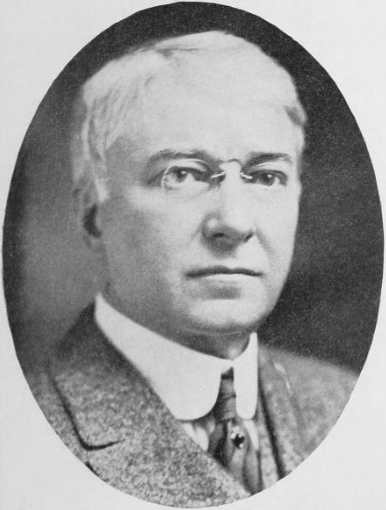
- Born: February 22, 1862; La Salle, Illinois, US
- Died: December 7, 1933 (aged 71); Brattleboro, Vermont, US
- Occupation: Publisher

Franklin Webster (February 22, 1862 − December 7, 1933) was an American publisher. He was the founder of The Insurance Press, and published and edited it from its creation in 1895 until 1927.

== Biography ==
Franklin Webster was born in La Salle, Illinois on February 22, 1862. He worked for a while at the La Salle County Press, which was owned by his father. In 1901 he founded Insurance Engineering, a monthly magazine about fire waste; the name was changed to Safety Engineering in 1912. He remained publisher and editor of it until 1921. He was at one point president of the American Trade Press Association. He died at a sanatorium in Brattleboro, Vermont in December 7, 1933.
