= The Little Princess Trust =

Children's cancer charity in the United Kingdom

The Little Princess Trust is a UK children's charity based in Hereford.

The charity provides free, real hair wigs to children and young people up to the age of 24 who have lost their own hair due to cancer treatment or to other conditions such as Alopecia.

== History ==
The charity was founded by Wendy and Simon Tarplee in memory of their daughter Hannah Tarplee. Hannah was diagnosed with cancer when she was four and lost her hair during chemotherapy.

The Tarplees had problems finding a suitable wig for Hannah before she died in 2005.

The charity is also a significant supporter of childhood cancer research in the UK and one study at Manchester University NHS Foundation Trust, funded by The Little Princess Trust, has revealed an innovative new treatment for children with acute myeloid leukaemia who were previously on a palliative care pathway.

The Little Princess Trust moved into its own headquarters in 2021 and the new premises is called The Hannah Tarplee Building.

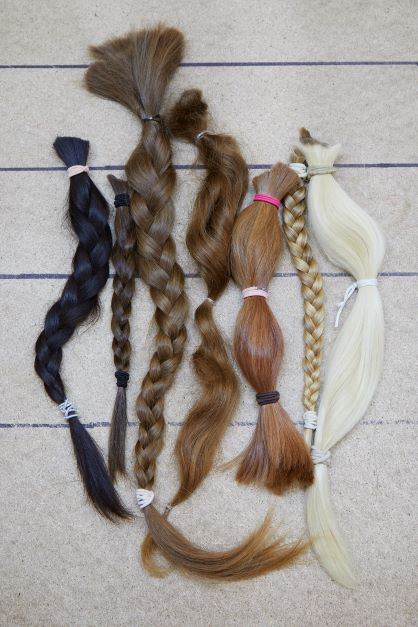
The Little Princess Trust turns hair donated by its supporters into wigs for children and young people.
