= Elizabeth I (2017 TV series) =

2017 television historical docudrama

- Also known as: Elizabeth & Her Enemies
- Genre: Docudrama
- Written by: Chris Holt, Dan Jones and Suzannah Lipscombe
- Directed by: Chris Holt
- Presented by: Dan Jones; Suzannah Lipscomb
- Starring: Lily Cole; Vincent Kerschbaum
- Country of origin: United Kingdom
- Original language: English
- No. of series: 1
- No. of episodes: 3

Production
- Executive producers: Abigail Adams; Susan Jones; Nicolas Kent
- Producer: Chris Holt
- Production location: UK
- Running time: 60 minutes
- Production companies: Oxford Film & Television and Motion Content Group

Original release
- Network: Channel 5
- Release: 9 May – 23 May 2017

Related
- Secrets of Great British Castles; Britain's Bloodiest Dynasty; Henry VIII and His Six Wives

Elizabeth I is a three-part British docudrama first broadcast in 2017 about Elizabeth I, and starring Lily Cole as Elizabeth and Vincent Kerschbaum as Duke of Feria.

In May 2017, historians Dan Jones and Suzannah Lipscomb co-wrote and co-presented, Elizabeth I which was shown on Channel 5.

== Cast ==
- Lily Cole as Elizabeth I
  - Summer Rose Allison as Elizabeth as a child
  - Sheya McAllister as young Elizabeth
  - Felicity Dean as Older Elizabeth
- Sally Mortemore as Kat Ashley
- Daisy Ashford as Mary Tudor
- Kate Holderness as Catherine Parr
- Vincent Kerschbaum as Duke of Feria
- James Oliver Wheatley as Thomas Seymour
- Ray Bullock Jnr as Bishop Stephen Gardiner
- Malcolm Tomlinson as Robert Tyrwhit
- Charlie Clements as Earl of Essex
- Audrey L'Ebrelle as Mary, Queen of Scots
- Chris Clynes as Thomas Wyatt the Younger
- Darren Bransford as Robert Cecil
- Daren Elliott Holmes as Lord Lindsay
- Will Kenning as Philip II of Spain
- Alex Hughes as William Cecil
- James Groom as Robert Dudley, Earl of Leicester
- Jamie Pigott as Lord Darnley
- James Ellis as Francis Walsingham

== Episode list ==
Episode	Queen	Broadcast
1	Battle for the Throne	9 May 2017
2	The Enemy Within	16 May 2017
3	Death of a Dynasty	23 May 2017
