= List of Insert Name Here episodes =

Insert Name Here is a BBC comedy panel game television show that began in 2016. It is presented by Sue Perkins and features Josh Widdicombe and Richard Osman as team captains. Each episode comprises the two teams of three competing to answer questions about famous people, past and present, who share the same first name or any similar derived name; for example the first episode was titled Frank but Sue said questions will also be asked on people called Francis, Frankie and Fanny. The first episode premiered on BBC Two on 4 January 2016. As of 27 February 2019, 28 episodes have been produced and broadcast across four series, including three Christmas specials. The show was canceled in February 2020 due to low viewership.

== Key ==
- The number in the "UK viewers (millions)" column are sourced from the Broadcasters' Audience Research Board (BARB).
  - N/A indicates the viewing figures for this episode were outside the Top 30 for the week
- Episodes with this background were won by Josh Widdicombe's team
- Episodes with this background were won by Richard Osman's team

== Episodes ==
=== Series 1 (2016) ===
| No. overall | No. in series | Subject | Josh's team | Richard's team | Original release date | UK viewers (millions) |
|---|---|---|---|---|---|---|
| 1 | 1 | Frank | Stephen Mangan; Kate Williams | Rob Beckett; Roisin Conaty | 4 January 2016 | N/A |
| 2 | 2 | William | Hugh Dennis; Alice Roberts | Omid Djalili; Lucy Porter | 11 January 2016 | N/A |
| 3 | 3 | Kate | Suzannah Lipscomb; Jennifer Saunders | Jessica Hynes; Romesh Ranganathan | 18 January 2016 | N/A |
| 4 | 4 | Jo | Danny Baker; Kate Williams | Aisling Bea; Robert Webb | 25 January 2016 | N/A |
| 5 | 5 | Dave | Ruth Goodman; Jon Richardson | Adil Ray; Holly Walsh | 1 February 2016 | N/A |
| 6 | 6 | Chris | Paul Hollywood; Sara Pascoe | Joe Lycett; Kate Williams | 8 February 2016 | N/A |

=== Series 2 (2016–17) ===
| No. overall | No. in series | Subject | Josh's team | Richard's team | Original release date | UK viewers (millions) |
|---|---|---|---|---|---|---|
| 7 | 1 | Christmas | Deborah Meaden; Kate Williams | Danny Baker; Sara Pascoe | 21 December 2016 | 1.29 |
| 8 | 2 | Alex | Danny Baker; Kate Williams | Gabby Logan; Adil Ray | 9 January 2017 | 1.35 |
| 9 | 3 | Mary | Suzannah Lipscomb; Stephen Mangan | Mel Giedroyc; Nish Kumar | 16 January 2017 | N/A |
| 10 | 4 | Ben | Paul Feig; Kate Williams | Chris Packham; Jon Richardson | 23 January 2017 | 1.30 |
| 11 | 5 | Charlie | James Acaster; Suzannah Lipscomb | Rob Beckett; Steph McGovern | 30 January 2017 | N/A |
| 12 | 6 | Steve | Chris Addison; Kate Williams | Al Porter; Lucy Porter | 6 February 2017 | N/A |

=== Series 3 (2017–18) ===
| No. overall | No. in series | Subject | Josh's team | Richard's team | Original release date | UK viewers (millions) |
|---|---|---|---|---|---|---|
| 13 | 1 | Tom | Nish Kumar; Kate Williams | Gabby Logan; Katherine Ryan | 20 November 2017 | N/A |
| 14 | 2 | Lou | Hugh Dennis; Suzannah Lipscomb | Rebecca Front; Phil Wang | 27 November 2017 | N/A |
| 15 | 3 | Anne | James Acaster; Kate Williams | Ed Balls; Lauren Laverne | 4 December 2017 | N/A |
| 16 | 4 | Paul | Ed Gamble; Suzannah Lipscomb | Katy Brand; Amol Rajan | 11 December 2017 | N/A |
| 17 | 5 | Christmas | Jack Dee; Suzannah Lipscomb | Liz Bonnin; Martin Kemp | 21 December 2017 | 1.09 |
| 18 | 6 | John | Miles Jupp; Kate Williams | Roisin Conaty; Sally Phillips | 8 January 2018 | N/A |
| 19 | 7 | Jane | Adrian Chiles; Suzannah Lipscomb | Sara Pascoe; Anita Rani | 15 January 2018 | N/A |
| 20 | 8 | Jack | Tom Davis; Kate Williams | Aisling Bea; Robert Peston | 22 January 2018 | N/A |

=== Series 4 (2018–19) ===
| No. overall | No. in series | Subject | Josh's team | Richard's team | Original release date | UK viewers (millions) |
|---|---|---|---|---|---|---|
| 21 | 1 | Xmas | Suzannah Lipscomb; Chris Packham | James Acaster; Carol Vorderman | 19 December 2018 | N/A |
| 22 | 2 | Mo | Tom Allen; Kate Williams | Griff Rhys Jones; Angela Scanlon | 2 January 2019 | N/A |
| 23 | 3 | Mark | Suzannah Lipscomb; Al Murray | Stephen Mangan; Ellie Taylor | 9 January 2019 | N/A |
| 24 | 4 | Emma | Desiree Burch; Kate Williams | Katy Brand; Nish Kumar | 23 January 2019 (Note: This episode was originally to air on 16 January but was postponed due to news coverage.) | N/A |
| 25 | 5 | Harry | Angela Barnes; Suzannah Lipscomb | Paul Feig; Jon Richardson | 30 January 2019 | N/A |
| 26 | 6 | Liz | Kerry Godliman; Kate Williams | Tom Davis; Gabby Logan | 13 February 2019 (Note: This episode was originally to air on 6 February but was postponed due to football coverage.) | N/A |
| 27 | 7 | Jules | Andy Hamilton; Suzannah Lipscomb | Reginald D. Hunter; Naga Munchetty | 20 February 2019 | N/A |
| 28 | 8 | Rob | Chris Harris; Kate Williams | Lucy Porter; Joe Wilkinson | 27 February 2019 | N/A |

== Scores ==
| Josh | Richard |
|---|---|
Series wins (3 drawn)
| 0 | 1 |
Episode wins (0 drawn)
| 13 | 15 |
