= Richard Sheppard =

Richard or Dick Sheppard may refer to:

- Dick Sheppard (priest) (1880–1937), English clergyman and pacifist
- Richard Sheppard (architect) (1910–1982), English architect
- Dick Sheppard (footballer) (1945–1998), English footballer
- Dick Sheppard or Richard Blade (born 1952), British-American radio and television personality
- Dick Sheppard (stuntman) (1930–2021), British stuntman
- Richard Shephard (1949 – 2021), British composer, educator, and Director of Development and Chamberlain of York Minster

== See also ==
- Dick Sheppard School, former girls school in Tulse Hill, South London
- Richard Shepard (born 1965), American film director and screenwriter
- Richard Shepherd (disambiguation)
