= Richard Shepherd (disambiguation) =

Richard Shepherd (1942–2022) was a British Conservative politician.

Richard Shepherd may also refer to:

- Richard Shepherd (theologian) (1732–1809), English churchman, Archdeacon of Bedford in 1783
- Richard Herne Shepherd (1842–1895), English bibliographer
- Richard Shepherd, founder in 1982 of Richard Shepherd Software
- Richard Shepherd (producer) (1927–2014), American film producer
- Richard Shepherd (chef) (1945–2022), won a Michelin star and then created a chain of successful brasseries
- Richard Shepherd (pathologist) (born 1952), retired English forensic pathologist
- Richard Shepherd, a character in the 2014 TV series Intruders
- Richard Shepherd, a 1869 recipient of the New Zealand Cross for killing Māoris in the New Zealand Wars.

== See also ==
- Richard Shepard (born 1965), American film director and screenwriter
- Richard Sheppard (disambiguation)
