= Book Drum =

Defunct wiki of profiles of books

- Founded: 2009
- Dissolved: 2018
- Website: www.bookdrum.com

Book Drum was a wiki that assembled and published companion profiles of fiction and non-fiction books. Each profile consisted of page-by-page illustrated reading notes called "bookmarks", summary, review, author’s biography, glossary, setting description and map. Contributors could upload images and embed maps, videos, links and related texts to illustrate and explain a book. Most contributors were readers, but some profiles were created by the books' own authors, and others by school classes. Some of the most popular profiles included War and Peace, The Reader, and Dracula.

The wiki was privately owned and operated by a British company, Book Drum Ltd, founded by Mark Negus, Hector Macdonald and George Pennock in November 2009. Book Drum has organised two profile-building Tournaments, with authors including Kate Williams and Naomi Alderman as judges. In November 2011, Book Drum launched a world map plotting all of the settings of the books covered on the site. The Map was cited by The Guardian, The New Yorker, January Magazine and The Independent, which wrote, "we join a number of book geeks in our addiction to Book Drum's new global map of literary stars and scenes".

On 19 April 2018 the owners announced on the company’s Facebook page that "we have been unable to find a way to make Book Drum sustainable in the longer term" and would be formally shutting down the site on 24 May. This was confirmed in a follow-up post on 22 June.
