= Britain's Bloodiest Dynasty =

2014 British television documentary

- Genre: Documentary
- Directed by: James Tovell
- Starring: Dan Jones
- Composer: Tom Howe
- Country of origin: United Kingdom
- Original language: English
- No. of series: 1
- No. of episodes: 4

Production
- Executive producer: Dan Gold
- Producers: Alma Bacula; Kate Bullions
- Production location: UK
- Running time: 60 minutes (series 1)

Original release
- Network: Channel 5
- Release: 27 November – 18 December 2014

Related
- Secrets of Great British Castles; Henry VIII and His Six Wives; Elizabeth I

Britain's Bloodiest Dynasty is a British television documentary about the Plantagenets presented by Dan Jones and first broadcast from 27 November to 18 December 2014. The four-part documentary follows the period from Henry II to Richard II.

The four-part Channel 5 (UK) was an adaptation of Jones's book The Plantagenets: The Warrior Kings and Queens Who Made England (2012, HarperPress: ISBN 978-0-00-721392-4).

== Episode list ==
Season	Episode	King	Broadcast
1	1	Henry II	27 November 2014
1	2	Henry III	4 December 2014
1	3	Edward II	11 December 2014
1	4	Richard II	18 December 2014
