= Anneka Rice =

British television presenter (born 1958)

Anneka Rice MBE
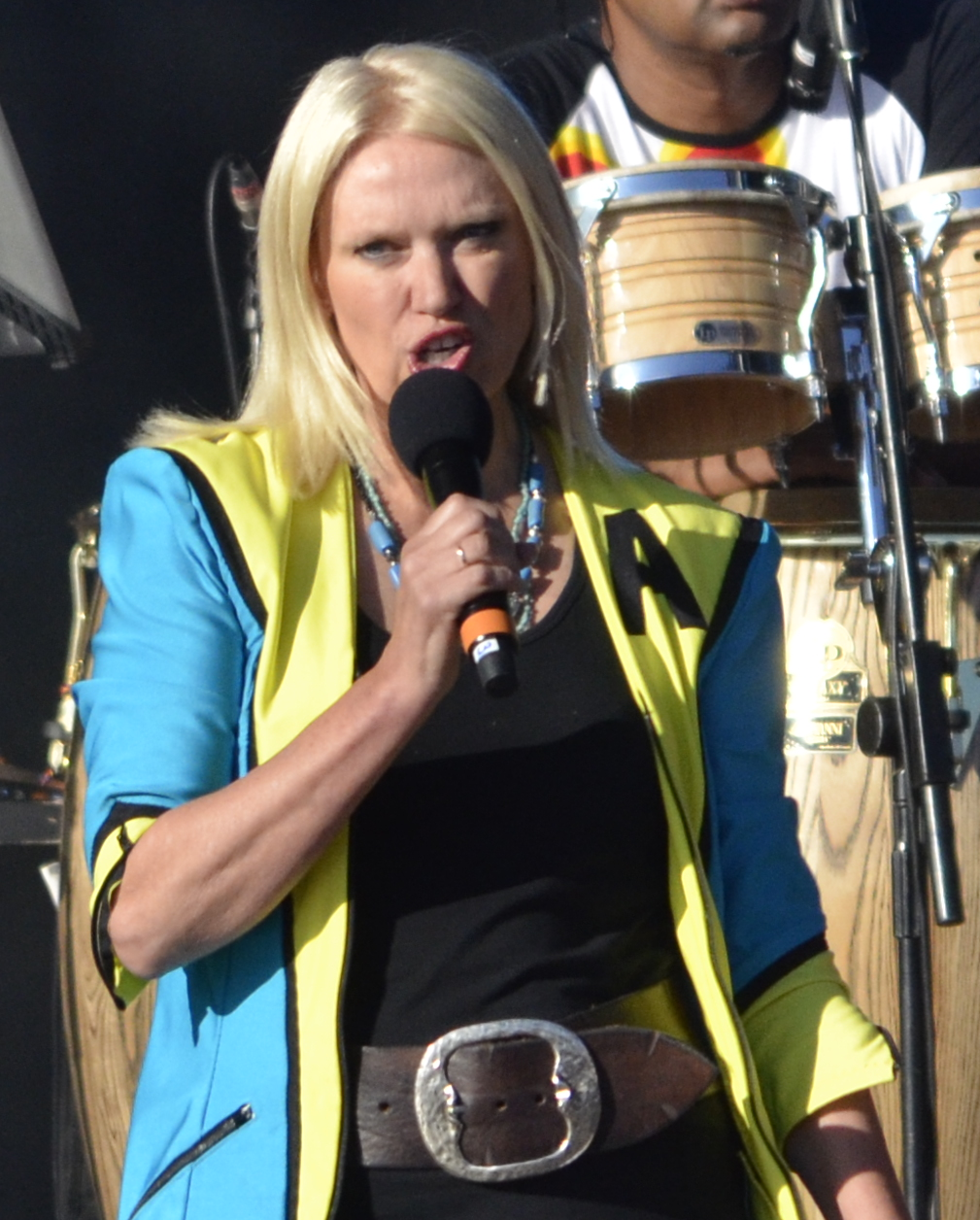
- Rice in 2013
- Born: Anne Lucinda Hartley Rice; 4 October 1958 (age 67); Cowbridge, Wales, United Kingdom
- Occupations: Presenter; journalist; painter
- Years active: 1980–1995; 2001–present

Anne Lucinda Hartley "Anneka" Rice (born 4 October 1958) is a British television and radio presenter, journalist and painter.

She began her broadcasting career with the BBC World Service and later moved to children's TV. Rice is best known for her role as the "skyrunner" on Channel 4's Treasure Hunt and her self-devised show Challenge Anneka. She took a sabbatical in 1995 to focus on raising her family and studied at Chelsea College of Art. Rice later returned to television and radio, hosting various shows, including Secrets of the National Trust for Channel 5 and BBC Radio 2's weekend breakfast show. In 2023, she relaunched Challenge Anneka on Channel 5.

== Early life and education ==
Rice was born in Cowbridge and grew up in Surrey, England. She was educated at three independent schools: Dunrobin School and St Michael's – both at Limpsfield, Surrey – and Croydon High School. Rice adopted the name "Anneka" when she joined the British actors' union Equity, as an Annie Rice had already been registered.

== Career ==
=== Television ===
Rice began her broadcasting career as a trainee for the BBC World Service, working on The World Today and Twenty-Four Hours. She then moved to BBC children's TV, where she worked for Monica Sims and as a production assistant on Lucky Numbers. At 19, she moved to Hong Kong, where she worked as a news sub-editor for TVB Pearl, the English-language TV station. She later became the regular evening news-reader. She also produced Wheelbase, a weekly drive-time radio show, for RTHK and worked as an account executive for PR company Corporate Communications. She published a book called A Children's Guide to Hong Kong. She dubbed kung fu films into English for Run Run Shaw late into the night and was a fittings model for Gloria Vanderbilt jeans during her lunch hours.

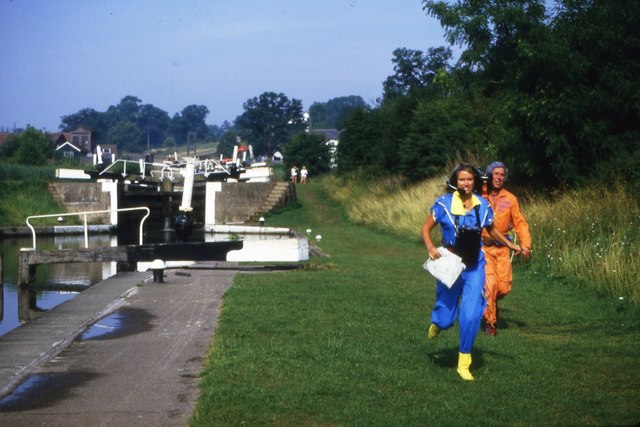
Rice filming Treasure Hunt at Hatton Locks in 1984

In 1982 she returned to the UK and worked as a reporter on CBTV for Thames Television. She then landed her first high-profile job, as the jump-suited "skyrunner" of Channel 4's Treasure Hunt, co-hosted by former BBC newsman Kenneth Kendall. The show remains one of Channel 4's highest-rated programmes ever, regularly getting over 7 million viewers. It was nominated for a BAFTA in 1986.

Rice hosted the BBC's Children in Need appeal in 1987 and tested an early version of her next project, Challenge Anneka. This had been devised by Rice herself and was launched in 1989 on BBC1. It ran for six series. Projects included the renovation of a Romanian orphanage in Siret, equipping a Malawi refugee camp, and over 60 UK projects, most of which are still going strong.

As the owner of the rights to Challenge Anneka, Rice remained involved with the format as it was sold to other European territories, which produced their own versions. in 2001 she co-produced an American version with ABC called Challenge America with Erin Brockovich: The Miracle in Manhattan, hosted by Erin Brockovich, a post-9/11 project to rebuild an amphitheater and soccer field in New York City.

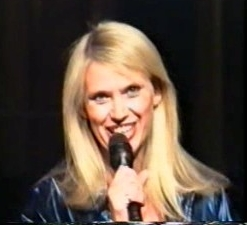
Rice at the recording of Challenge Anneka at the Royal Albert Hall, London, 1995

Through the 1980s and 1990s Rice presented Wish You Were Here...? for ITV. Taking over as main presenter on BBC1's Holiday in 1999, she travelled to over 50 countries. She was a regular part-time presenter on TVAM with Nick Ross, hosting one week a month, and also hosted Sporting Chance on BBC2, inviting celebrities to take up a new sport. She took part in BBC's Driving Force, teaming up with rally-cross driver Barry Lee to win the otherwise all-male competition in races driving Chieftain tanks, off-road cars, trucks and JCB diggers.

She co-presented Combat for ITV with Emlyn Hughes, pitting regiments of the British forces against each other. She presented Capital Woman, a weekly women's magazine programme for ITV in the 1990s. She was the host of Passport, which saw contestants taken to Botswana, Hong Kong, Los Angeles and Egypt to compete in gruelling local activities to win a glamorous holiday at the end. She also hosted the Children's Royal Variety Show and guested on numerous other shows. During this time Madame Tussaud's created a waxwork of her in her famous jumpsuit. She also had a Spitting Image puppet made of her.

Rice took a sabbatical to bring up her young family in 1995 and enrolled at Chelsea College of Art for two years. She has painted ever since.

In the 2000s she returned to work as a regular on The Wright Stuff and as host for Channel 5 series Dinner Doctors. In 2006 Challenge Anneka returned to ITV for two specials, the first broadcast on Boxing Day. This was a post-tsunami project in Sri Lanka. The second project, in 2007, was to produce an album to raise money for the Children's Hospice Association.

In 2006 she co-hosted ITV Sunday-morning cookery show Sunday Feast. She also took part in the ITV programme Extinct, presented by Sir Trevor McDonald and Zoë Ball, which saw Rice and seven other celebrities visit endangered animals in their natural habitat. Rice travelled to the North Pole to track polar bears by helicopter and fit them with tracking collars.

In September 2007 she appeared on Hell's Kitchen and was also a contestant on Celebrity Mastermind (broadcast 1 January 2010). She chose the life and career of Jean Rhys as her specialist subject.

In June 2012, Rice co-hosted BBC1 programme Rolf Paints... Diamond Jubilee with Rolf Harris in celebration of Queen Elizabeth II's jubilee. In August 2012, she was named co-presenter of The Flowerpot Gang on BBC One with Joe Swift (TV garden presenter) and Phil Tufnell. She was a presenter on Secrets of the National Trust for Channel 5 in 2016.

In 2017, she appeared as a contestant on Richard Osman's House of Games and participated in Channel 4's Celebrity Hunted for Stand Up to Cancer.

In 2019 she took part in Celebrity Antiques Road Trip for BBC2 with friend Liz Carr. She was a contestant for Kirstie Allsopp's Celebrity Craft Masters; and on BBC One's Strictly Come Dancing, partnered with Kevin Clifton and featuring regularly on It Takes 2. She was also a guest on Channel 4's Bake Off, An Extra Slice and Children in Need 2019.

In 2020 she took part in Joe Lycett's Got Your Back and ran with her Radio 2 colleagues for BBC One's Sport Relief.

In 2023 she relaunched her popular 1990s show Challenge Anneka on Channel 5.

=== Radio ===
Rice's radio career started as a BBC trainee for the World Service, where she worked on The World Today and Twenty-Four Hours.

In Hong Kong she produced a weekly drive-time show for RTHK.

In the 1980s in the UK she was a regular stand-in for Gloria Hunniford on Radio 2 and presented The Waiting Game for Radio 4 in 1990, a nine-week series on pregnancy. She was also a regular guest on Loose Ends and presented Inside the Life Drawing Class, a documentary for Radio 4 about life drawing.

In 2012 Rice and Patrick Kielty filled in for Alan Carr and Melanie Sykes on BBC Radio 2 which led to her confirmation in February 2012 as the successor to Zoe Ball on the Weekend Breakfast Show, live from 6am. After five years she took over the late night Saturday slot, presenting Pick of Radio 2. She has presented specials for Friday Night is Music Night. She also presented the Arts Show, taking over from Jonathan Ross. She was the regular Radio 2 host for the Olivier Awards and the Evening Standard Awards. Since 2017 she has presented Junior Choice on Christmas Day morning, following the death of long time host Ed Stewart.

In 2017 she wrote and presented a two-hour Christmas special about Ronnie Wood, his art and music, called Paint it Black.

In 2018 she was a guest on My Teenage Diary for Radio 4 and in 2020 she presented Anneka's 80s TV Treasure Hunt for Radio 2.

== Other ==
Rice was involved with the 1999 Cricket World Cup, promoting the one-day event as a new way for people, especially women, to get into cricket.

She had a range of sport clothes and jumpsuits in the 1980s produced in collaboration with the clothing chain, DASH.

She presented the Adventure Series, making films about learning to scuba-dive, ski and sail, which were accompanied by books. There have been various Treasure Hunt and Challenge Anneka annuals and board games.

In 1986 she won the Rear of the Year award.

=== Painting ===
Rice studied at Chelsea College of Art. She is now part of Maggi Hambling's Master Class and regularly exhibits her work.

=== Journalism ===
Rice was the weekend TV critic for the Mail on Sunday in the mid-2000s and has been a travel writer for them from 2004. She had a column for The Radio Times in 2019 and now writes an occasional column for The Independent. She returned to Siret in 2013 to write about the fate of the orphans from the original Challenge Anneka programme.

=== Theatre and performance ===
Rice performed in panto at the Manchester Palace, the Theatre Royal Brighton, The Arts Theatre Cambridge and the Richmond Theatre during the 1980s. She acted in 3 tours of The Vagina Monologues in 2005 and 2006.

In 2015 she gave a piano recital at the Christmas Gala at the Kings Place, giving herself five months to re-learn, having not played since she was a child. She was part of The Great Western Choir and sang at the Big Chill Festival in 2009.

=== Stand-up ===
Rice writes and performs stand-up comedy at the Backyard Comedy Club in Bethnal Green. Her last two ventures, in 2018 and 2020, The Clemmie Hart Years about her secret fictional agent, and Help! My Head's in Wookey Hole, about her search for her missing Madame Tussaud's waxwork, were recorded for Radio 4.

=== Chelsea Flower Show ===
Rice had a Chelsea Garden in 2017, designed alongside Sarah Raven and Tricia Guild, as part of a BBC parade of gardens.

== Personal life ==
Rice married theatre boss Nick Allott in 1988, with whom she has two sons. She had another son with TV executive Tom Gutteridge in 1997.

Rice was appointed Member of the Order of the British Empire (MBE) in the 2026 Birthday Honours for services to charity and to broadcasting.

== Television shows ==
- CBTV Channel 14 (1982–85)
- Treasure Hunt (1982–89)
- Driving Force (1984)
- Wish You Were Here...? (presenter)
- Good Morning Britain (presenter)
- Aspel & Company (guest – March 1986)
- The Grand Knockout Tournament (participant, 1987)
- Challenge Anneka (presenter 1989–95, 2006/7, 2023-25) nominated for two technical BAFTAs in 1991
- KYTV (guest – June 1990)
- 2point4 Children (guest appearance – September 1992)
- So Graham Norton (guest appearance – February 2001)
- I Love 1980s (guest appearance – March 2001)
- Ready, Steady, Cook (guest – June 2001)
- A Question of TV (guest appearances – August 2001)
- Remotely Funny (guest – July 2002)
- RI:SE (breakfast show guest, February 2003)
- Dinner Doctors (presenter)
- Richard & Judy (June 2003)
- Absolute Power (November 2003)
- Hell's Kitchen (May 2004)
- QI (aka Quite Interesting) (November 2004)
- Have I Been Here Before? (May 2005)
- Our Survey Says: the Ultimate Game Show Moments
- The Big Call (guest – June 2005)
- The Wright Stuff (guest panellist – September 2005)
- Holiday (presenter)
- Passport
- Sporting Chance
- Driving Force
- Capital Woman
- Combat
- Come Dine with Me (Celebrity Special – July 2006)
- Hell's Kitchen (Contestant – September 2007)
- Heads or Tails on Five (special guest 2009)
- Celebrity Mastermind, BBC1, contestant, 1 January 2010
- Countdown, Channel 4, 'Dictionary Corner' guest, 3–7 October 2011
- Countdown, Channel 4, 'Dictionary Corner' guest, 2–6 April 2012
- Rolf Paints....Diamond Jubilee, BBC1 (co-host), 5 June 2012
- Flowerpot Gang, BBC1, co-host, August 2012
- Richard Osman's House of Games, contestant, 4–8 September 2017
- Celebrity Hunted – SU2C special, 10–24 October 2017
- Strictly Come Dancing - contestant, September 2019; eliminated after performing the Charleston in week three
- Countdown, guest (2019)
- Kirsty Alsopp's Celebrity Craft Masters (2019)
- Sky Arts Celebrity Portrait of the Year (2019)
- Joe Lycett's Got Your Back (2020)
- The Weakest Link (2022)
- Challenge Anneka (2023)
