= Secrets of the National Trust =

British television series (2017–2020)

- Genre: Documentary
- Presented by: Alan Titchmarsh
- Country of origin: United Kingdom
- Original language: English
- No. of series: 5
- No. of episodes: 24

Production
- Production companies: Spun Gold and Motion Content Group

Original release
- Network: Channel 5
- Release: 7 February 2017 – 15 December 2020

Secrets of the National Trust is a television programme, anchored by Alan Titchmarsh, which first aired on Tuesday 7 February 2017 on Channel 5 and then on 5Select until 15 December 2020.

== History ==
The show was based on Alan Titchmarsh and other well known celebrities and experts visiting National Trust properties and showing viewers stories, restoration work and other interesting facts about National Trust property and lands.

The programme came under scrutiny when, in Series 1 Episode 1, viewers were told that they were visiting Croome Court in Shropshire, when in fact the stately home is located in Worcestershire.

== List of episodes ==
Each week Alan Titchmarsh was based at an anchor location. Each episode usually featured two or three cutaways to other locations with a relevant link, presented by a guest celebrity. The Kingston Lacy and Tyntesfield episodes were finally broadcast on 5Select as part of series 5 on 17 November and 15 December 2020 respectively. They were originally expected to be shown in August 2018.

Series 1:

- Episode 1 - Tuesday 7 February 2017 - anchor location Knole House, Kent - viewed by 1.14m
- Episode 2 - Tuesday 14 February 2017 - anchor location Hill Top, Cumbria - viewed by 1.07m
- Episode 3 - Tuesday 21 February 2017 - anchor location Attingham Park, Shropshire - viewed by 1.32m
- Episode 4 - Tuesday 1 March 2017 - anchor location Quarry Bank Mill, Cheshire - viewed by 1.19m
- Episode 5 - Tuesday 8 March 2017 - anchor location Lyme Park, Cheshire - viewed by 1.13m
- Episode 6 - Tuesday 15 March 2017 - anchor location Fountains Abbey, Yorkshire - viewed by 1.3m

Series 2:

- Episode 1 - Tuesday 27 February 2018 - anchor location Hardwick Hall, Derbyshire
- Episode 2 - Tuesday 6 March 2018 - anchor location Stowe House, Buckinghamshire
- Episode 3 - Tuesday 13 March 2018 - anchor location Waddesdon Manor, Buckinghamshire
- Episode 4 - Tuesday 20 March 2018 - anchor location The Workhouse, Southwell, Nottinghamshire
- Episode 5 - Tuesday 27 March 2018 - anchor location Cragside, Northumberland
- Episode 6 - Tuesday 3 April 2018 - anchor location Castle Ward, County Down, Northern Ireland

Series 3:

- Episode 1 - Wednesday 27 June 2018 - anchor location Erddig, North Wales
- Episode 2 - Wednesday 4 July 2018 - anchor location Shugborough Hall, Staffordshire
- Episode 3 - Wednesday 11 July 2018 - anchor location Mount Stewart, County Down, Northern Ireland
- Episode 4 - Wednesday 18 July 2018 - anchor location Dunham Massey Hall, Cheshire

Series 4:

- Episode 1 - Tuesday 23 July 2019 - anchor location Petworth House, West Sussex
- Episode 2 - Tuesday 30 July 2019 - anchor location Chartwell, Kent
- Episode 3 - Tuesday 6 August 2019 - anchor location Plas Newydd, Anglesey

Series 5:

- Episode 1 - Tuesday 17 November 2020 - anchor location Kingston Lacy, Dorset
- Episode 2 - Tuesday 24 November 2020 - anchor location Kedleston Hall, Derbyshire
- Episode 3 - Tuesday 1 December 2020 - anchor location Ham House, Greater London
- Episode 4 - Tuesday 8 December 2020 - anchor location Penrhyn Castle, Gwynedd
- Episode 5 - Tuesday 15 December 2020 - anchor location Tyntesfield, Somerset

== List of co-hosts ==
- Anneka Rice
- Jon Culshaw
- Joan Bakewell
- Oz Clarke
- Miriam O'Reilly
- Dan Jones
- Suzannah Lipscomb
- Nigel Havers
- Louis Emerick
- Angellica Bell
- Jennie Bond
- Peter Purves
- Pete Waterman
- Shappi Khorsandi
- Alison Hammond
- Ronnie Archer Morgan
- Tony Singh
- Floella Benjamin
- Nina Wadia
- Clive Aslet
- Angela Rippon
- Lisa Holloway
- Gloria Hunniford
