= Insert Name Here =

2016 British comedy panel game show

- Genre: Comedy panel game
- Written by: Will Ing; Paul Powell
- Directed by: Geraldine Dowd
- Presented by: Sue Perkins
- Starring: Josh Widdicombe; Richard Osman
- Theme music composer: Will Slater
- Country of origin: United Kingdom
- Original language: English
- No. of series: 4
- No. of episodes: 28 (list of episodes)

Production
- Executive producers: Paul McGettigan; Dan Gaster; Michael Mannes
- Producer: Margaret Anne Docherty
- Production location: Pinewood Studios
- Editors: Jon Ellis; Rob Mansell
- Running time: 30 minutes
- Production companies: 12 Yard; Black Dog Television

Original release
- Network: BBC Two
- Release: 4 January 2016 – 27 February 2019

Insert Name Here is a British comedy panel game show presented by Sue Perkins. The programme made its debut on BBC Two on 4 January 2016. In each episode two teams of three compete to answer questions about famous people, past and present, who have just one thing in common: they share the same name. The team captains are Josh Widdicombe and Richard Osman. The show was cancelled on 26 February 2020 due to low viewership.

== Background ==
Insert Name Here had four pilots: one called "Britain's Favourite", recorded on the theme of Steves and due to be broadcast in February 2011, but pulled out of the broadcast schedule at short notice; one in July 2012 discussing Davids and called "And You Are..." (both of these were fronted by Miranda Hart); one in March 2013 as "Name Droppers"; and one in April 2015 with its current title (both fronted by Sue Perkins).

The first series went out on Monday nights in the slot that the final series of Never Mind the Buzzcocks occupied. The Times announced that Perkins's appointment as host made her the first female presenter of a mainstream British comedy TV panel show, a distinction that some commentators had previously assumed would belong to Sandi Toksvig when she began hosting QI later the same year. However, the online column Weaver's Week argued that Sue Barker, Jo Brand, and Gabby Logan had all beaten Perkins to the post, with A Question of Sport, Jo Brand's Hot Potatoes, and I Love My Country, respectively.

A name is picked before the show, and the aim of the game is to find out the best possessor of that name. This may be somebody either using that name or having been born with that name or its variants – for example, Frank discussions would also address Francises, Frankies and Fannys – and the name is divulged at the start of the show.

=== Round 1 ===
Four owners of that name are listed as characteristics (for example, Secret Frank). Four facts are revealed about said owner, and then free discussion takes place. After a few minutes, Sue asks a question about the owner and whoever's guess is closest gets that owner. Three of the owners are discussed in this way.

=== Round 2 ===
The second round involves three owners being laid out and then a related question asked. Whoever gets that question right gets that owner, while whoever doesn't gets a bonus – a comparatively useless owner. Three sets of three are discussed in this way.

=== Round 3 ===
This round is on the buzzer, and a half-finished question is asked. Teams are asked to finish the question. Three of these are asked. Afterwards, the winners are the team with the most owners; the winning team captain gets the privilege of declaring who they think is the best owner. In addition, booby prizes are awarded to both teams.

== Transmissions ==
The coloured backgrounds denote the result of each of the series:

– indicates Josh's team won the series.
– indicates Richard's team won the series.
– indicates the series ended in a draw.

Series	Start date	End date	Christmas Special	Episodes	Names covered
1	4 January 2016	8 February 2016	—N/a	6	Frank; William; Kate; Jo; Dave; Chris
2	9 January 2017	6 February 2017	21 December 2016	6	Alex; Mary; Ben; Charlie; Steve
3	20 November 2017	22 January 2018	21 December 2017	8	Tom; Lou; Anne; Paul; John; Jane; Jack
4	2 January 2019	27 February 2019	19 December 2018	8	Mo; Mark; Emma; Harry; Liz; Jules; Rob

== Guest appearances ==
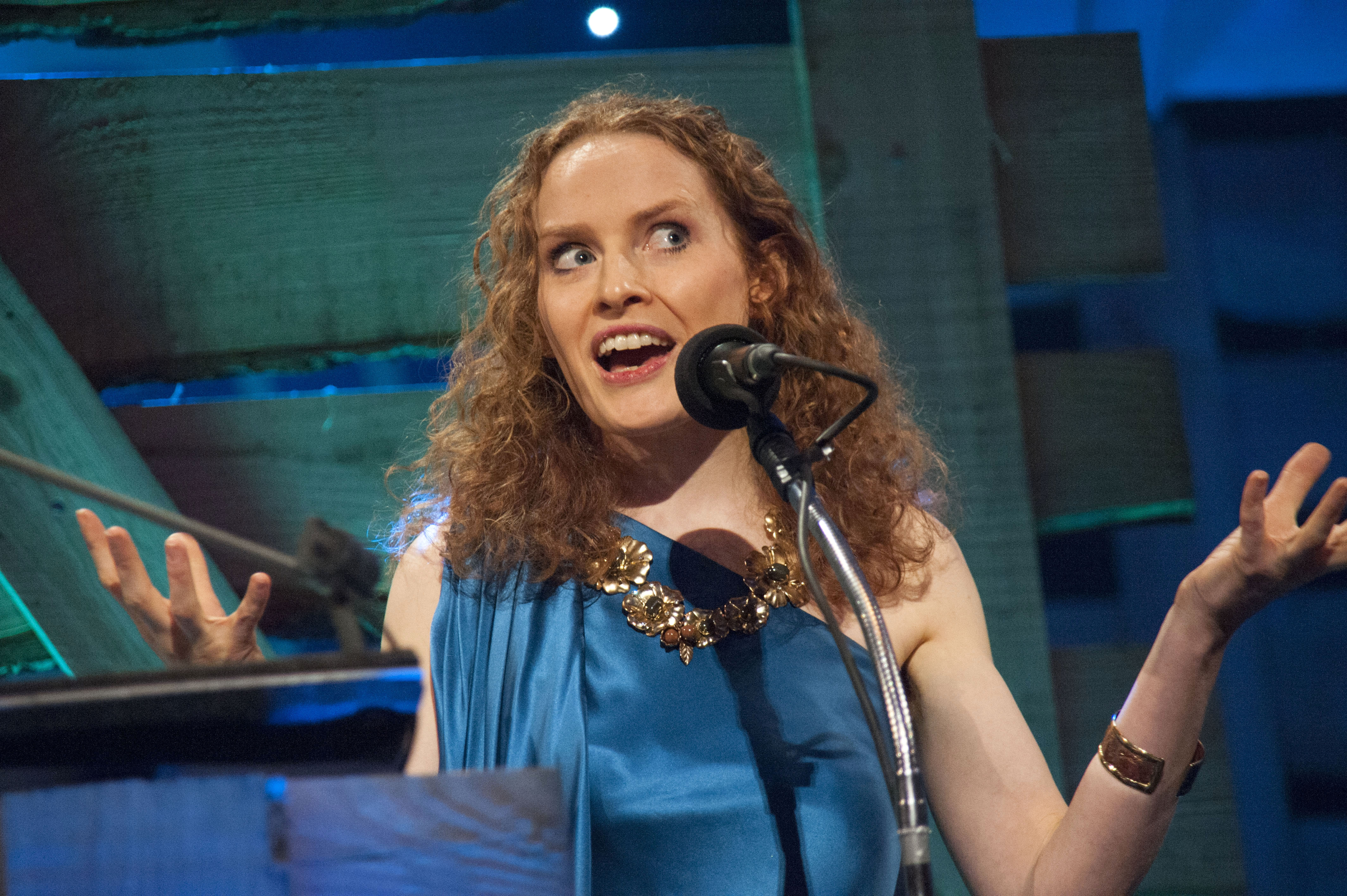
Kate Williams has made fifteen guest appearances making her the most frequent guest on the programme.

The following all appeared multiple times as one of the guest panellists on the show:

15 appearances

- Kate Williams

11 appearances

- Suzannah Lipscomb

3 appearances

- James Acaster
- Danny Baker
- Nish Kumar
- Gabby Logan
- Stephen Mangan
- Sara Pascoe
- Lucy Porter
- Jon Richardson

2 appearances

- Aisling Bea
- Rob Beckett
- Katy Brand
- Roisin Conaty
- Tom Davis
- Hugh Dennis
- Paul Feig
- Chris Packham
- Adil Ray

== Reception ==
Tim Dowling of The Guardian noted the show's "breezy contempt for its own formalities", saying that the show echoed 8 Out of 10 Cats Does Countdown in that respect, though stated that "the latter has the distinct advantage of a well-understood and much-loved set of actual rules. Here, there was nothing established to undermine, unless it was the very notion of the panel show". He summarised by calling the show "an amiable enough half hour" and noted that "no one will ever accuse Insert Name Here of taking itself too seriously".

The Times' Alex Hardy was more positive, saying that while Sandi Toksvig hugged each of her guests before hosting episodes of The News Quiz, "in the best possible way, this feels like a show where everyone has been hugged. It’s partly that the concept is so loose that the conversation can spin off anywhere. … It's partly that the chemistry really worked, with everyone contributing intelligently and amusingly. It is funny and it is (fairly) clever, which is pretty close to the panel-show holy grail."

== International broadcasters ==
Internationally, the series premiered in Australia on BBC UKTV on 8 November 2016.
