= Henry VIII and His Six Wives (TV series) =

- Genre: Documentary
- Starring: Dan Jones
- Country of origin: United Kingdom
- Original language: English
- No. of series: 1
- No. of episodes: 4

Production
- Production location: UK
- Running time: 60 minutes
- Production companies: Oxford Film & Television and Motion Content Group

Original release
- Network: Channel 5
- Release: 15 April – 6 May 2016

Related
- Britain's Bloodiest Dynasty; Secrets of Great British Castles; Elizabeth I

Henry VIII and His Six Wives is a four-part British documentary first broadcast in 2016 about Henry VIII and his wives, chronicling his turbulent private life and how it shaped Britain.

In April 2016, Leeds historian Dan Jones co-wrote and co-presented, with Dr. Suzannah Lipscomb, Henry VIII and His Six Wives which was shown on Channel 5.

== Episode list ==
Episode	Queen	Broadcast
1	Katherine of Aragon	15 April 2016
2	Anne Boleyn	22 April 2016
3	Jane Seymour & Anne of Cleves	29 April 2016
4	Catherine Howard & Catherine Parr	6 May 2016

== Cast ==
- Charlie Clements as Henry VIII
- Toby Osmond as Thomas Cromwell
- Kate Holderness as Catherine Parr
- Harriet Green as Anne Boleyn
- Marta Hermida as Catherine of Aragon
- Chris Huntly-Turner as Bishop Gardiner
- Malcolm Tomlinson as Thomas Cranmer
- Tiffany Ceri as Mary Boleyn
- Darren Bransford as Francis Dereham
- Chris Clynes as Mark Smeaton
