= Josh Widdicombe =

English comedian and presenter (born 1983)

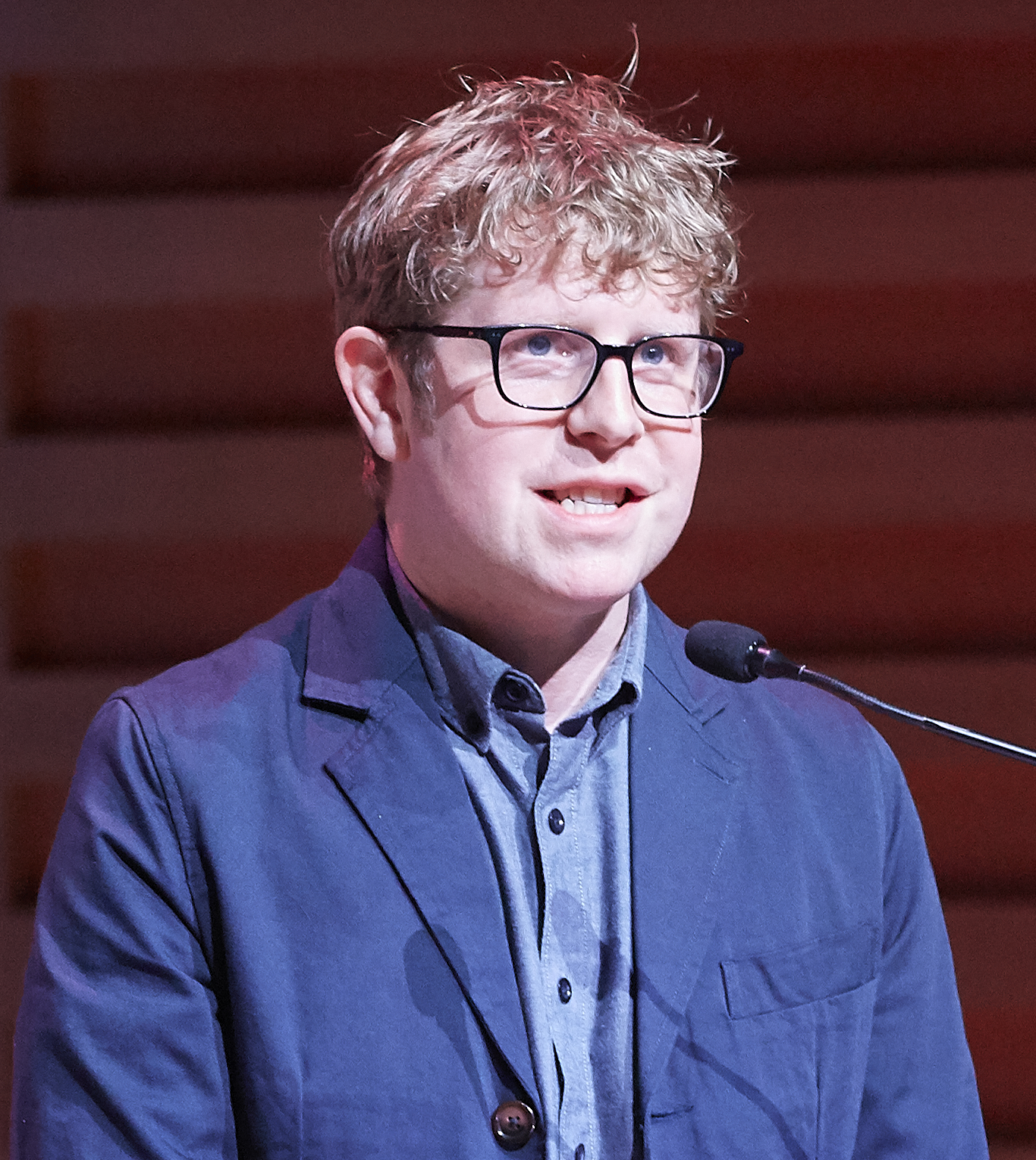
- Widdicombe in 2018
- Born: Joshua Michael Widdicombe; 8 April 1983 (age 43); Hammersmith, London, England
- Education: University of Manchester (BA); City, University of London (MA)
- Notable work: The Last Leg (2012–present); Fighting Talk (2014–2016); Josh (2015–2017); Insert Name Here (2016–2019)
- Spouse: Rose Hanson (m. 2019)
- Children: 2

Comedy career
- Years active: 2008–present
- Medium: Radio; stand-up; television
- Genres: Observational comedy; social satire
- Subjects: Everyday life; marriage; family; British politics; social awkwardness
- Website: joshwiddicombe.com

Joshua Michael Widdicombe (/ˈwɪdɪkəm/; born 8 April 1983) is an English comedian, presenter, journalist and actor. He is known for appearances on The Last Leg (2012–present), Fighting Talk (2014–2016), Insert Name Here (2016–2019), Mock the Week (2012–2016) and his BBC Three sitcom Josh (2015–2017), as well as being the new host of Strictly Come Dancing (2026).

Widdicombe won the first series of Taskmaster in 2015 and the show's first Champion of Champions special in 2017. He hosted Hypothetical with fellow comedian James Acaster (2019–2022). During the 2020 COVID-19 lockdown, he started the Parenting Hell podcast with fellow comedian Rob Beckett.

== Early life and education ==
Widdicombe was born on 8 April 1983 in Hammersmith, London, but grew up in Haytor Vale, near Widecombe in the Moor on Dartmoor in Devon. He attended Ilsington Church of England Primary School, South Dartmoor Community College and Exeter College, later studying sociology and linguistics at the University of Manchester. After graduation, he moved to London to complete a master's degree in magazine journalism at City, University of London.

== Career ==
Widdicombe began performing live in 2008 and made it to the final of the So You Think You're Funny? comedy tournament at the Edinburgh Festival Fringe during the same year. In 2009, he co-wrote and performed in the sketch show Superclump, and appeared with James Acaster and Nick Helm.

In 2010, Widdicombe worked as a contributor for the Dora the Explorer magazine, and in 2011 he performed his debut solo show "If This Show Saves One Life..." at the Edinburgh Festival Fringe, and was subsequently nominated for Best Newcomer by the Foster's Edinburgh Comedy Awards and for the Malcolm Hardee "Act Most Likely to Win a Million Quid" Award.

In 2012, Widdicombe became a regular on Stand Up for the Week. In July that year, he made his debut appearance on Mock the Week. He was also a main contributor to Channel 4's daily alternative review of each day's events at the London 2012 Summer Paralympics, The Last Leg with Adam Hills, alongside Adam and Alex Brooker. He also appeared on The Last Leg of the Year, the show's end-of-year special. In September 2012, Widdicombe appeared on The Million Pound Drop with The Last Leg co-host Brooker. The pair won £100,000 for their selected charities. His chosen charity was Scope. He has pectus excavatum, which he discovered after mentioning it to Christian Jessen on season 11, episode 10 of 8 Out of 10 Cats.

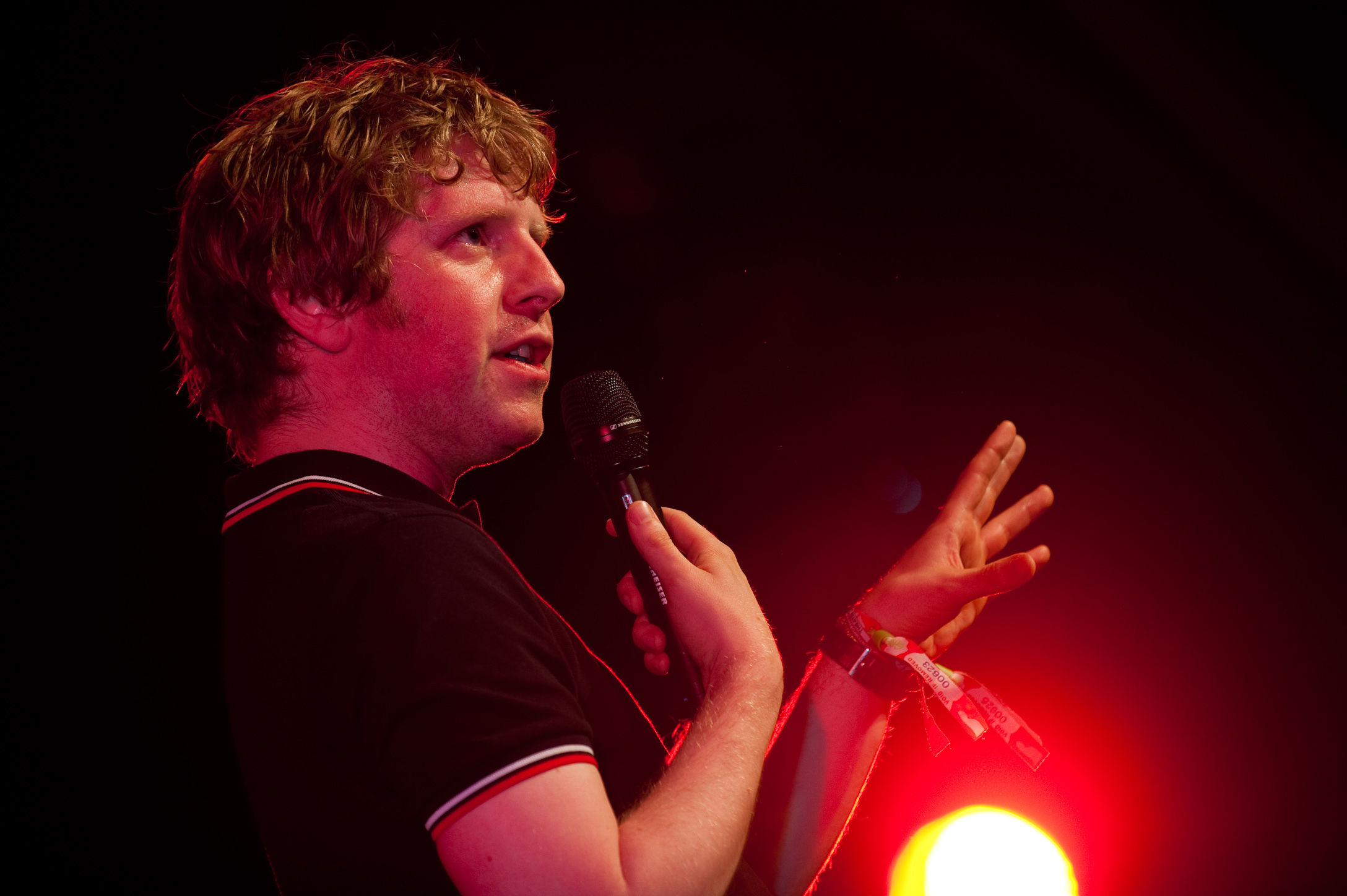
Widdicombe at Glastonbury Festival 2013

In 2013, Widdicombe was again a regular on The Last Leg, after Channel 4 renewed the show for nine further episodes, beginning on 25 January 2013. A third series started on 31 July 2013, a fourth on 31 January 2014 and a fifth on 1 August 2014. In May 2013, Widdicombe was a guest on the second series of Dara Ó Briain: School of Hard Sums with Marcus Brigstocke. Following this, he featured as a comedian on The Apprentice spin-off show, The Apprentice: You're Fired! In June 2013, he again appeared as a panellist on Mock the Week, featuring on several episodes of the show's 12th series.

In 2014, Widdicombe appeared again on Mock the Week and on QI, and also made his debut on Have I Got News for You. Widdicombe won Celebrity Mastermind broadcast 31 December 2013 with a score of 24, on the specialist subject of his favourite band, Blur. His chosen charity was The Lily Foundation.

On 1 July 2014, the BBC announced Widdicombe would be joining its Radio 5 Live team from August 2014 as the new host of Fighting Talk along with Georgie Thompson. Both hosts announced on 10 August 2016 that they would not be returning to the show for series 14 in September due to their "increasingly busy schedules".

In August 2014, Widdicombe starred in the BBC Three Comedy Feeds pilot Josh, which he co-wrote with comedian Tom Craine and which was directed by David Schneider. A full six-episode series of Josh, also directed by Schneider, ran on BBC Three from 11 November to 16 December 2015. BBC Three ordered a second full series of Josh; and a third and final series followed in 2017.

In 2015, Widdicombe was a contestant on the first series of the Dave game show Taskmaster and won the series. For one of the tasks, Widdicombe got a tattoo of host Greg Davies's name on his left foot. He then returned for a team task in series two where he was partnered with Richard Osman and Jon Richardson.

Widdicombe has performed on radio on BBC Radio 4's Arthur Smith's Balham Bash, and Absolute Radio's The Frank Skinner Show, written for comedy panel shows Mock the Week, 8 Out of 10 Cats, and BBC Radio 4's Look Away Now, and supported stand-up comedians Russell Howard, Michael McIntyre, Alan Carr, Stephen Merchant and Shappi Khorsandi on their respective live tours.

Widdicombe hosted a weekly radio show on XFM (now Radio X) with Neil "Producer Neil" Fearn from February 2013 to July 2015, which was broadcast initially on Saturdays but which moved to Sundays in August 2014 coinciding with his new role as Fighting Talk presenter (see above). The show regularly featured contributions from comedians James Acaster, Nish Kumar, Joe Lycett and several others along with occasional interjections and background laughter by XFM's "Intern Charles". The podcast of the show was named "iTunes Best New Audio Podcast" in 2013.

Widdicombe has made four appearances on Live at the Apollo. He was a featured performer on Episodes 7.8 (21 January 2012), 9.1 (22 November 2013) and 11.7 (AKA Nöel at the Apollo; 20 December 2015) and hosted on Episode 12.2 (14 November 2016).

In December 2015, Widdicombe announced that he was a team captain on the BBC Two comedy panel show Insert Name Here, appearing alongside Richard Osman and host Sue Perkins. The show aired in January 2016 and returned for two more series in January 2017/2018.

In December 2017, Widdicombe returned to Taskmaster for a two-part series alongside his fellow winners of previous series including Katherine Ryan, Bob Mortimer, Rob Beckett and Noel Fielding to compete in the Taskmaster - Champion of Champions; He won the series.

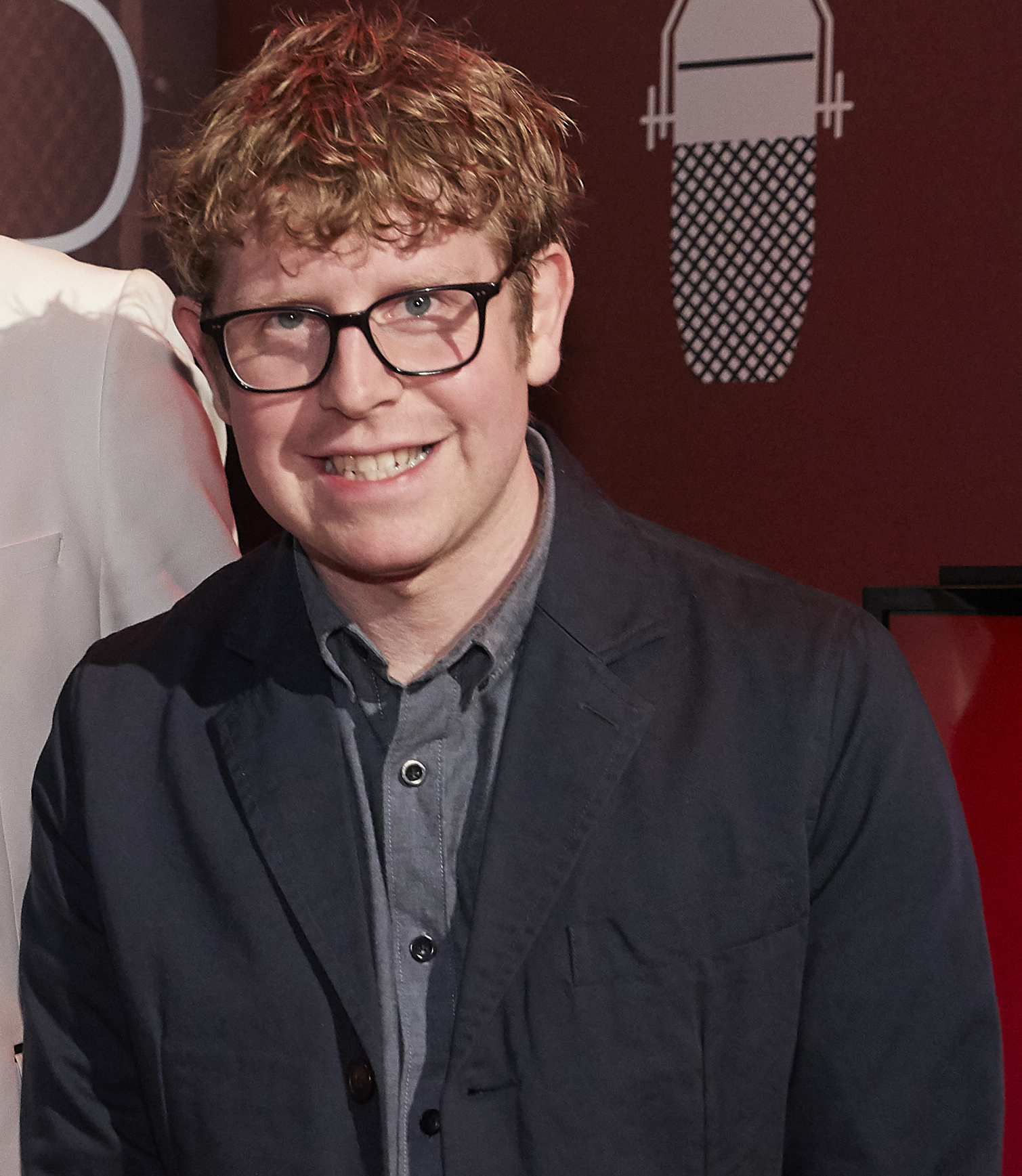
Widdicombe in 2018

Widdicombe hosts 1990s football nostalgia podcast and live shows called Quickly Kevin, Will He Score?. Guests include footballers such as Iain Dowie, Darren Huckerby, Pat Nevin and Matthew Le Tissier as well as comedians such as Elis James, Tom Parry, Ivo Graham and Matt Forde.

In 2019 Widdicombe began hosting panel show Hypothetical with James Acaster for UK television channel Dave. In 2020, Widdicombe started a parenting podcast with fellow comedian Rob Beckett, titled Lockdown Parenting Hell. It was renamed Parenting Hell following the third national lockdown. It is a podcast about bringing up children, experiences, tips and face-palm moments. In 2021, it was announced that Widdicombe had written a book: Watching Neighbours Twice a Day... How '90s TV (Almost) Prepared Me for Life, published in September 2021. It made The Sunday Times bestsellers list.

In 2023, Widdicombe was announced as a voice actor in the preschool animated series Big Lizard.

In December 2024 he voiced Barnsley in the Bluey episode "Butlers". He also appeared in the Strictly Come Dancing Christmas special, dancing a charleston with professional Karen Hauer to the song "Let It Snow" while dressed as a penguin.

In February 2025 Widdicombe made his debut on BBC Radio 2 sitting in for Romesh Ranganathan on his Saturday Show, alongside actor and presenter Siobhan McSweeney.

In May 2026 it was announced that Widdicombe would be one of the new hosts of Strictly Come Dancing, alongside Emma Willis and Johannes Radebe, after the departure of former hosts Tess Daly and Claudia Winkleman.

== Honours and awards ==
Widdicombe was awarded an honorary degree by the University of Exeter in 2024.

== Personal life ==
Before becoming a comedian, Widdicombe worked as a sports journalist, writing for The Guardian. He supports Plymouth Argyle. He is a vegetarian. He is married to Rose Hanson, a television producer, with whom he has a daughter, born in October 2017, and a son, born in May 2021. The couple lived for a considerable amount of time in Shoreditch, before moving to a "sleepier" area of east London to raise their children.

His claim of descent from Sabine Baring-Gould was confirmed by a 2021 episode of the genealogical television series Who Do You Think You Are? The programme traced his ancestry further back via the Baring family to the Knollys family, a noble family during the Tudor era; Lettice Knollys is a direct-line ancestor of Widdicombe's, and as such he is related to Queen Elizabeth I through her aunt, Mary Boleyn. His 10×-great-grandfather, Henry Rich, 1st Earl of Holland, was a close friend of King Charles I, for whom he was Groom of the Stool. Through Mary, Widdicombe is a direct descendant of King Edward I and King Philip III of France.

He has purchased a second home in Mullion, Cornwall, previously owned by Barrie Cook, now extensively renovated.

His brother Henry Widdicombe is the founder of the Welsh comedy production company Little Wander and the Machynlleth Comedy Festival.

In 2022 Widdicombe suffered from burnout, panic attacks and insomnia. He did not want to take antidepressants and so used talking therapy and meditation to "readjust that feeling of inadequacy and reorganise his priorities."

== Stand-up DVDs ==
- Live: And Another Thing (18 November 2013)
- What Do I Do Now... Live (28 November 2016)
