= Secrets of Great British Castles =

- Genre: Documentary
- Starring: Dan Jones; Billy McGrath (writer)
- Country of origin: United Kingdom
- Original language: English
- No. of series: 2
- No. of episodes: 12

Production
- Production location: UK
- Running time: 60 minutes
- Production companies: Sideline Productions and Motion Content Group

Original release
- Network: Channel 5
- Release: 3 April 2015 – 9 December 2016

Related
- Britain's Bloodiest Dynasty; Henry VIII and His Six Wives

Secrets of Great British Castles is a British history documentary series that grew from the success of Irish TV series Tales of Irish Castles. The idea - initially created and written by Billy McGrath - was rejected by state broadcaster RTE. It was subsequently pitched to Ben Frow - the director of programming for Ireland's first commercial channel, TV3, and it proved a ratings success. When he returned to London to head up Channel 5 Ben asked Billy (then partner in Sideline Productions) to expand on a new idea based on UK castles. The result was the much more ambitious Secrets of Great British Castles produced by Dublin based Sideline in 12 parts. It was first broadcast between 3 April 2015 and 9 December 2016 (6 parts per season). Historian Dan Jones came on board as host and writer to explore the history behind Great Britain's most famous castles and is currently broadcast on Netflix around the globe. International sales for SoGBC were secured by screen content distributors DCD Rights and sold to 160 countries world-wide. The deal with DCD was negotiated by ICM Partners London (now CAA).

== Episode list ==
Season	Castle	Place	Broadcast
1	Dover Castle	England	3 April 2015
1	Tower of London	England	10 April 2015
1	Warwick Castle	England	17 April 2015
1	Caernarfon Castle	Wales	24 April 2015
1	Stirling Castle	Scotland	1 May 2015
1	Carrickfergus Castle	Northern Ireland	8 May 2015
2	Edinburgh Castle	Scotland	28 October 2016
2	Cardiff Castle	Wales	4 November 2016
2	York Castle	England	18 November 2016
2	Leeds Castle	England	25 November 2016
2	Lancaster Castle	England	2 December 2016
2	Arundel Castle	England	9 December 2016
