= Suzannah Lipscomb =

British historian and television presenter

Professor Suzannah Lipscomb FRHistS FHEA FSA
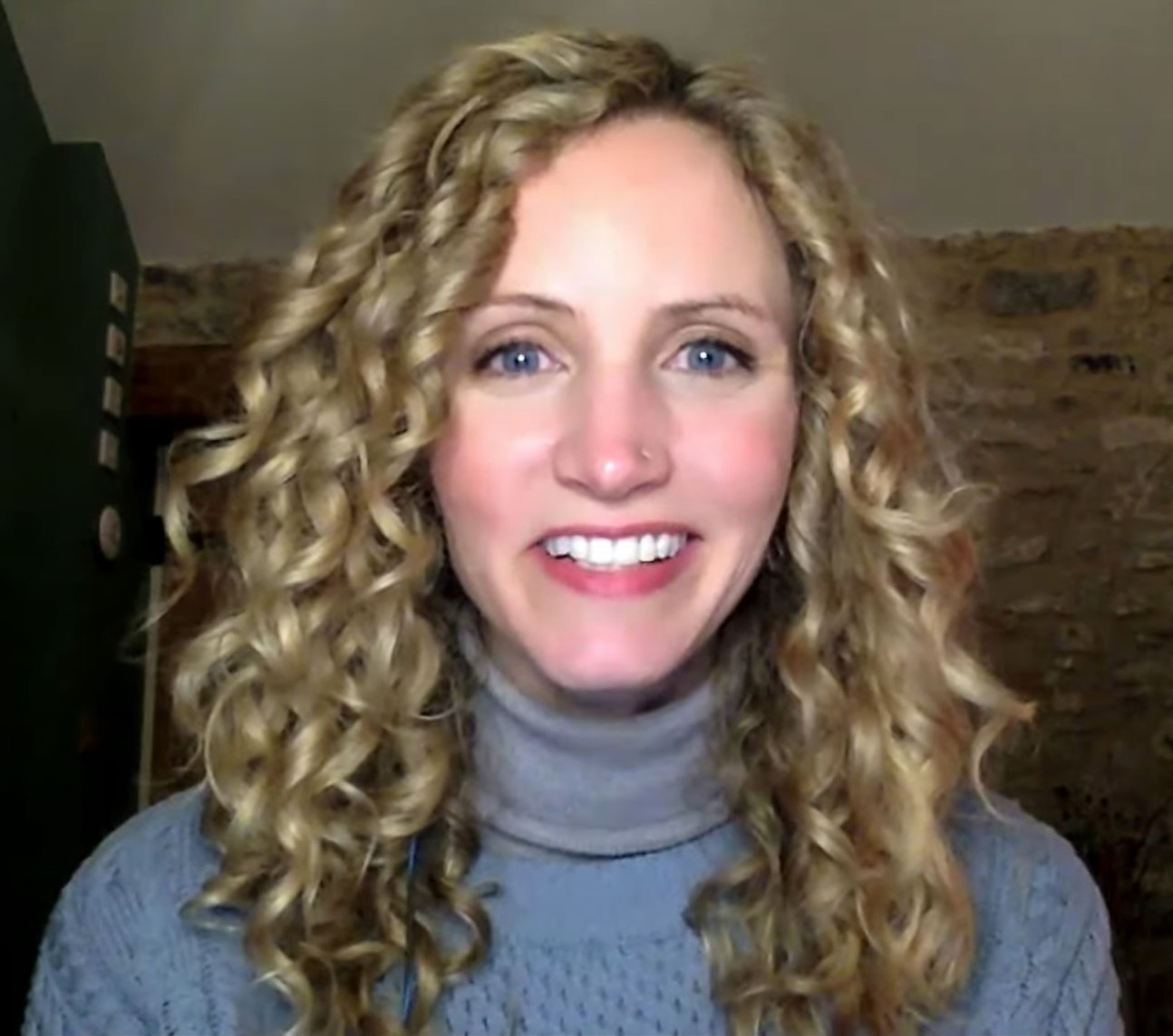
- Lipscomb speaks to the British Library in 2022
- Born: Suzannah Rebecca Gabriella Lipscomb; 7 December 1978 (age 47)
- Education: Lincoln College, Oxford, MA (Oxon); Balliol College, Oxford, M.St, D.Phil.
- Scientific career
- Fields: History
- Workplaces: University of East Anglia; New College of the Humanities; University of Roehampton
- Website: suzannahlipscomb.com

Suzannah Rebecca Gabriella Lipscomb FRHistS FHEA FSA (born 7 December 1978) is a British historian and professor emerita at the University of Roehampton, a Fellow of the Royal Historical Society, the Higher Education Academy and the Society of Antiquaries, and has for many years contributed a regular column to History Today. She has written and edited a number of books, presented numerous historical documentaries on TV and is host of the Not Just the Tudors podcast from History Hit. She is also a royal historian for NBC.

Her research focuses on the sixteenth century, in both English and French history, and covers religious, women’s history, political, social, and psychological history. She has also written and talked about British and European witch trials.

Lipscomb was previously a member of the board of governors of Epsom College. She worked as a curator for Historic Royal Palaces at Hampton Court; as a lecturer at the University of East Anglia; as a senior lecturer and convenor for history at the New College of the Humanities; and, as a reader at the University of Roehampton, where she became a professor when she was appointed to a personal chair as a professor of history in January 2019.

In December 2020, Lipscomb was appointed a trustee of the Mary Rose Trust.

== Early life and education ==
Lipscomb grew up in Surrey near Hampton Court Palace, which she credits for sowing "the seeds of a lifelong fascination with the Tudors." She was educated at Nonsuch High School for Girls, Epsom College, and Lincoln and Balliol colleges of the University of Oxford. In 2009, she was awarded her Doctorate of Philosophy from Oxford, with a thesis entitled Maids, Wives, and Mistresses: Disciplined Women in Reformation Languedoc. Her doctoral supervisor was Robin Briggs.

== Academic career ==
While completing her thesis, she worked as a curator at Hampton Court Palace, where she was responsible for organising a series of exhibitions held throughout the spring and summer of 2009 to mark the 500th anniversary of Henry VIII of England's accession to the throne. The programme won the 2011 Arts and Humanities Research Council (AHRC)-sponsored KTP Award for Humanities for the Creative Economy. She is a consultant to Historic Royal Palaces, and is an external member of their research strategy board.

In 2010, Lipscomb became a lecturer in history at the University of East Anglia.

In 2011, Lipscomb was elected a Fellow of the Royal Historical Society.

From September 2011, she was head of the Faculty of History at the New College of the Humanities, and stepped down in September 2016 to concentrate on research and teaching for a further year.

In 2012, Lipscomb was awarded the Nancy Lyman Roelker Prize by the Sixteenth Century Society for her journal article "Crossing Boundaries: Women's Gossip, Insults, and Violence in Sixteenth-Century France", in French History (Vol. 25, No. 4).

In October 2018, Lipscomb was awarded Fellowship of the Higher Education Academy (FHEA).

In September 2017, she joined the Faculty of Humanities at the University of Roehampton as a reader in Early Modern History, and was appointed as a professor of history at the University of Roehampton in January 2019. She is currently professor emerita in their School of Humanities and Social Sciences.

Lipscomb previously served as a governor at Epsom College, and was appointed as a Trustee to the Mary Rose Trust in December 2020.

In 2021, Lipscomb was awarded a Special Commendation by the Social History Society for her book, The Voices of Nîmes: Women, Sex, and Marriage in Reformation Languedoc.

At their ballot on 17 February 2022, Lipscomb was elected a Fellow of the Society of Antiquaries.

== Media career ==
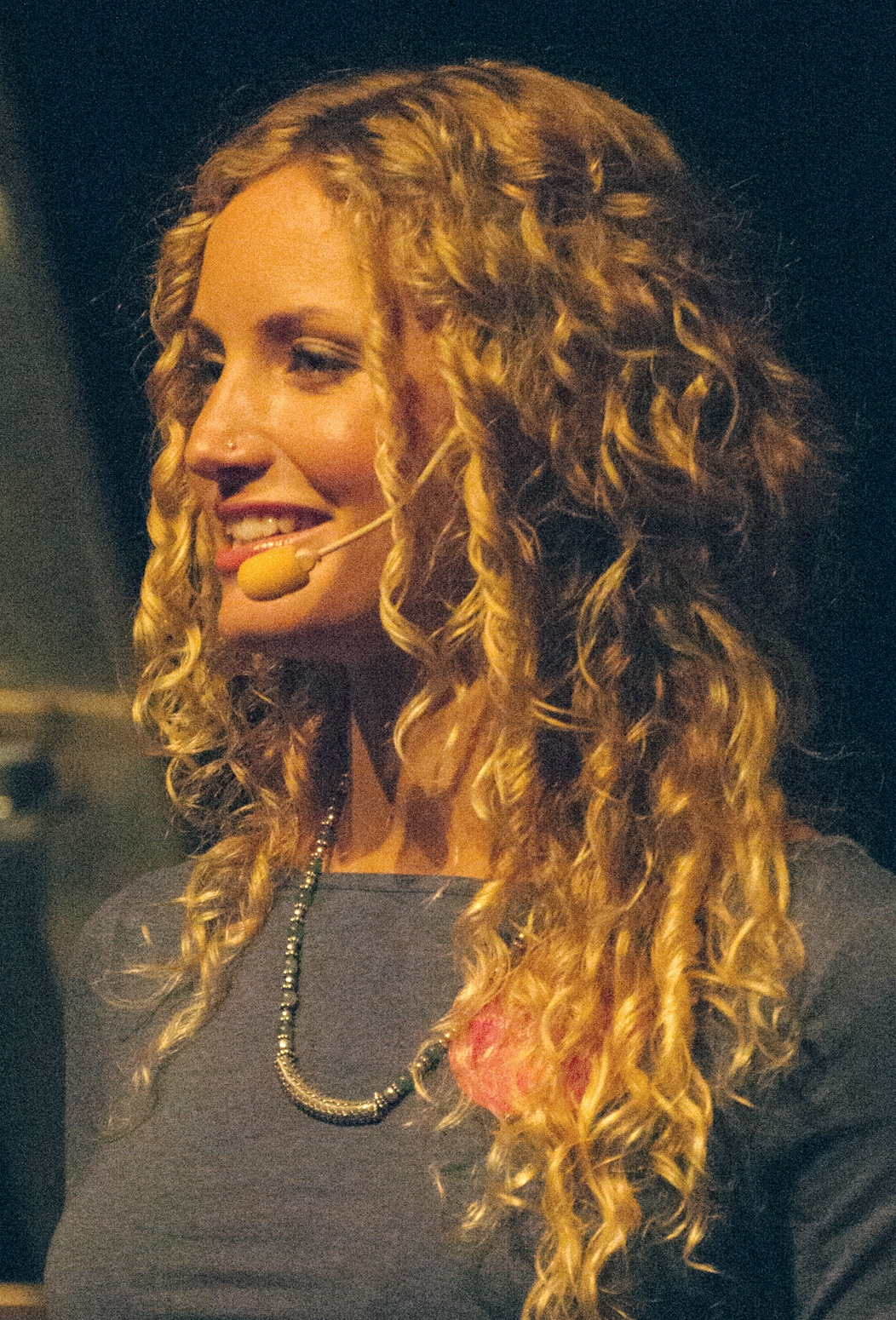
Lipscomb speaking in 2013

She contributed to five episodes of The Secret Life Of: for the Yesterday TV channel. The series was designed to give "tabloid treatment of historical icons", and includes an episode where Lipscomb and co-host Lucy Worsley "revel in these raunchy titbits" about Henry VIII's love life. Lipscomb also contributed to Time Team, Series 20, for Channel 4.

With Joe Crowley, she presented Bloody Tales of Europe and Bloody Tales of the Tower for the National Geographic Channel.

In May 2013, Lipscomb appeared in The Last Days of Anne Boleyn on BBC Two, which featured other historians and historical novelists, including David Starkey, Philippa Gregory, and Hilary Mantel.

Lipscomb co-presented I Never Knew That About Britain, for ITV (2014). The series was described by The Independent's critic, Ellen E. Jones, as "too busy adorning the obvious with bunting to uncover anything truly fascinating".

She wrote and presented a two-part documentary titled Henry and Anne: The Lovers Who Changed History for Channel 5. The Daily Telegraph critic, Jake Wallis Simons, called it "dumbed-down tommyrot". However, the Radio Times stated that "Dr Suzannah Lipscomb can manage the story of Henry VIII and Anne Boleyn perfectly well all by herself [without 'ropey reconstructions']." In January 2019, the programme was re-presented on Channel 5 as Queen for a Thousand Days.

Lipscomb wrote and presented Hidden Killers of the Victorian Home for BBC Four, as well as the follow-up shows New Hidden Killers of the Victorian Home, Hidden Killers of the Edwardian Home, and Hidden Killers of the Tudor Home. Writing for the Daily Telegraph, Australian critic Clive James gave Hidden Killers of the Edwardian Home a positive review, "principally because Ms Lipscomb was almost as fascinating as her subject". In May 2016, she wrote and presented Hidden Killers of the Post-War Home, again for BBC Four.

In October 2015, Lipscomb wrote and presented Witch Hunt: A Century of Murder, a two-part documentary for Channel 5. On 27 October 2015, Lipscomb joined Matthew Sweet, Marina Warner, Larushka Ivan-zadeh, Claire Nally, and Catherine Spooner, to talk about witchcraft and witch-hunting, in history, film, and politics on the BBC Radio programme Free Thinking.

In January 2016 and January 2017, she appeared in two episodes of the BBC Two comedy panel game show Insert Name Here. Between November 2017 and January 2018, she again participated in a further four episodes of the same programme. She participated on the programme additional times in January 2018 and December 2019. In April 2016, she co-wrote and co-presented, with Dan Jones, Henry VIII and His Six Wives, which was shown on Channel 5. On 13 December 2016, she appeared as a contestant on Series 6 of Celebrity Antiques Road Trip, partnered with David Harper, against Kate Williams and Catherine Southon.

In January 2017, Lipscomb spoke about how C. S. Lewis had inspired her life on BBC Radio 4's Great Lives series, together with Malcolm Guite. That same month, Lipscomb appeared on BBC Radio 4's Today programme to discuss the Archbishop of Canterbury's expected apology for the violence that followed the Protestant Reformation, to commemorate the 500th anniversary of the Reformation.

In May 2017, in collaboration with Dan Jones, Lipscomb co-wrote and co-presented a three-part docu-drama, Elizabeth I, for Channel 5. For three consecutive evenings in May and June 2017, Lipscomb, alongside Dan Jones and engineer Rob Bell, presented The Great Fire for Channel 5, a series in which the three presenters walked the actual route the Great Fire of London took across the city. In June and July 2017, Lipscomb was the week's guest on the BBC Radio 3 programme titled Essential Classics, where she selected her favourite classical pieces of music for presenter Rob Cowan.

Between 2017 and 2019, Lipscomb was a regular contributor to "Dictionary Corner" on Countdown with Susie Dent. On 13 January 2018, Lipscomb appeared as a contestant on an academic version of Pointless Celebrities, partnered with performance poet John Cooper Clarke, where they reached the head-to-head round.

In March and April 2018, she appeared on Channel 5's Secrets of the National Trust with Alan Titchmarsh. On 6 March 2018, in Series 2, Episode 2, she visited Cliveden Conservation to meet the stonemasons restoring Stowe's statues. On 3 April 2018, in Episode 6, she visited County Down, where she learnt about Castle Ward's starring role in the TV adaptation of Game of Thrones, and made swords with the show's armourer.

In March 2018, Lipscomb began a series of podcasts for Historic England entitled Irreplaceable: A History of England in 100 Places. The podcast, presented by Lipscomb and journalist Emma Barnett, was awarded silver (second) in the "Best Branded Content" category of the British Podcast Awards on 19 May 2018. Lipscomb presented The Tsar and Empress: Secret Letters on Australia's SBS TV Channel in April 2018, and on the Yesterday channel in May 2018.

Over four weeks in March 2019, Lipscomb, with Dan Jones and engineer Rob Bell, presented London: 2000 Years of History, for Channel 5 (UK).

Lipscomb was a judge of the biography and memoirs section for the Costa Book Awards, and the Costa Book of the Year competition in 2019. In 2020, she was Head Judge of all sections of the Costa Book Awards, and the Costa Book of the Year.

On 29 April 2021, Lipscomb began presenting her own podcast under the History Hit Umbrella, entitled Not Just The Tudors. After the initial four episodes, new episodes of Not Just The Tudors became available twice weekly. One reviewer on Podbay gives it five stars and says, "The blend of scholarship and public history is perfect", another five-star reviewer states, "It is informative yet pithy, humorous yet serious. Also impressive is the huge range of topics it addresses! I’m always amazed." Other reviewers on Chartable describe this podcast as "Addictive", "Splendid presentation and intriguing material", and "Fascinating and refreshing".

In July and August 2021, Lipscomb presented Walking Tudor Britain for 5Select, in which the historian walked across different parts of Britain to uncover exciting hidden secrets of Tudor history.

In November 2021, Lipscomb was a guest on Damian Barr's The Big Scottish Book Club, where she gave a reading from her latest book, What is History, Now?, followed by a discussion about how to recover the lost lives of women.

In September 2022 Lipscomb was a major contributor to The Age of Elizabeth after the death of Queen Elizabeth II.

On 30 January 2023 for More Four Lipscomb presented The Royals: A History of Scandals, a four-part series written by her and featuring in the first episode Wealth and Opulence, followed by Suspicious Deaths; Sex & Infidelity, and Scandalous Marriages over the following three weeks.

In 2023 Lipscomb presented the first series of Step into The Past, a podcast in collaboration with the National Trust, the first episode of which was about Lipscomb's own family.

Lipscomb was chair of judges of the inaugural Women's Prize for Non-Fiction 2024, the longlist for which was announced in February 2024, the shortlist was announced in March 2024, with the winner, Naomi Klein, announced in June 2024, for her book Doppelgänger: A Trip into the Mirror World.

In October 2024 Lipscomb presented the first part of the second series of The Royals: A History of Scandals, which continued over six weeks. Part One was entitled Murder.

In September 2025 Lipscomb began presenting the four-part historical investigation series Ancient Autopsy for More4, in which she investigated the deaths of Alexander the Great, Cleopatra, Genghis Khan and Tutankhamun with forensic pathologist Richard Shepherd.

She was featured in the docudrama Titanic Sinks Tonight on BBC Two, a miniseries of four episodes chronicling the sinking of the Titanic.

In September 2026, together with Dan Snow Lipscomb presented "How the Tudors Lost their Heads". A six-part series for National Geographic and Disney Plus.

Also in 2026, Lipscomb, together with several other leading historians, joined Radio 3's Gillian Moore for a major new series, Key Changes: Radio 3's Essential History of Classical Music, charting a course through 1,000 years of classical musical history.

== Live performances ==
In 2026 Lipscomb was joined by historian, Kate Williams in various cities around the UK to lecture on the rivalry between Queen Elizabeth I and Mary Queen of Scots in To Kill a Queen.

== Political life ==
In May 2016, Lipscomb was one of 300 prominent historians, including Simon Schama and Niall Ferguson, who were signatories to a letter to The Guardian, telling voters that if they chose to leave the European Union (EU) on 23 June, they would be condemning Britain to irrelevance.

In January 2022, Lipscomb was one of over 310 writers and publishers, including Bernardine Evaristo and Robert Macfarlane, who asked the House of Lords to vote down the government's Police, Crime, Sentencing and Court Bill in a letter to The Times, entitled Freedom to Protest.

== Personal life ==
Reflecting on her days at Nonsuch High School for Girls in 2022, she said, "It was completely part of the culture that there was an older girl that you had a crush on and that was for everybody, no matter. Though many people ended up not identifying themselves as being gay."

Lipscomb is married and has a child with her husband, actor Tom Hutch. They also have a dog.

== Bibliography ==
- Henry VIII: 500 Facts. Brett Dolman, Suzannah Lipscomb, Lee Prosser, David Souden, and Lucy Worsley. Historic Royal Palaces. 2009. ISBN 978-1-873993-12-5.
- 1536: The Year that Changed Henry VIII. Lion. 2009. ISBN 978-0-7459-5365-6.
- A Visitor's Companion to Tudor England. Ebury, Random House. 2012. ISBN 978-0-09-194484-1. Published in the United States as A Journey Through Tudor England, by Pegasus Books. July 2013. ISBN 978-1-60598-460-5.
- Lipscomb, Suzannah (2013). Betteridge, Thomas (ed.). Henry VIII and the court : art, politics and performance. Farnham, Surrey: Ashgate. ISBN 978-1-4094-1185-7.
- The King is Dead: The Last Will and Testament of Henry VIII. Head of Zeus. London. November 2015. ISBN 978-1-78408-191-1
- Lipscomb, Suzannah (2018). Witchcraft. illus. Martyn Pick. London: Ladybird Books. ISBN 978-0-7181-8843-6.
- The Voices of Nîmes: Women, Sex, and Marriage in Reformation Languedoc. Oxford University Press, Oxford, February 2019. ISBN 9780198797661
- Lipscomb, Suzannah (2021). Carr, Helen (ed.). What is History, Now?. London: Weidenfeld and Nicolson. ISBN 978-1-4746-2245-5.

=== Introduction ===
- Rex, Richard (2014). Tudors The Illustrated History. Stroud: Amberley Publishing. ISBN 978-1-4456-4371-7.

=== Foreword ===
- K, D (2020). A History of Magic, Witchcraft and the Occult. London: Penguin Random House. ISBN 978-1-4654-9429-0.
