= Dick Sheppard (stuntman) =

British stuntman

- Born: 20 May 1930; Gloucester, England
- Died: 1 March 2021 (aged 90)
- Occupation: Stuntman

Dick Sheppard (20 May 1930 – 1 March 2021), nicknamed "Daredevil Dick", was a British stuntman.

== Life and career ==
Sheppard was born in Gloucester. He attended Calton Road Junior and Crypt Grammar School. He was accepted by Cambridge University, but declined the acceptance for a job in a motorcycle shop. He owned the Whitepost Garage in Bristol Road. He was a member of the Dare Devils' Disaster Squad, and the Motor Stunt Team.

In 1969, Sheppard held the record of riding through a 30 foot tunnel of fire, and he performed as a stunt driver in the film The Italian Job. He also performed stunts in the films Thunderball and Diamonds Are Forever, and understudied for Sean Connery in a James Bond film. According to the Western Daily Press, in 1973, he stated that "he has destroyed more vehicles than anyone in the world". In the same year, he received injuries when he fell of his motorcycle after losing consciousness during a tunnel fire ride in Leek, Staffordshire.

Sheppard retired in 1993, and according to his Stroud News & Journal obituary, he wrecked over 2,000 cars.

== Death ==
Sheppard died on 1 March 2021, at the age of 90.
