= Richard Shepherd (pathologist) =

English forensic pathologist

Richard Shepherd is an English retired forensic pathologist known for performing numerous high-profile post-mortem examinations, such as the investigations into the deaths of Princess Diana, Stephen Lawrence, 9/11 and 7/7 victims.

In 2022, Shepherd hosted the TV series The Truth About My Murder in which he explains the forensics and investigation behind murders such as of Jeffrey Howe, Helen Bailey and Peter Farquhar.

In 2025 he appeared in the four-part historical investigation series Ancient Autopsy for More4, in which he and historian Suzannah Lipscomb examined the deaths of Alexander the Great, Cleopatra, Genghis Khan and Tutankhamun from a scientific perspective.

== Works ==
- Richard Shepherd (2018). Unnatural Causes. London: Michael Joseph. ISBN 9780718182717.
- Richard Shepherd (2021). The Seven Ages of Death. London: Michael Joseph. ISBN 9780241472033.
- Shepherd, Richard, ed. (2003). Simpson's Forensic Medicine (12th ed.). Arnold Publishers. ISBN 9780340810590.
