= Dan Jones (writer) =

British historian and journalist (born 1981)

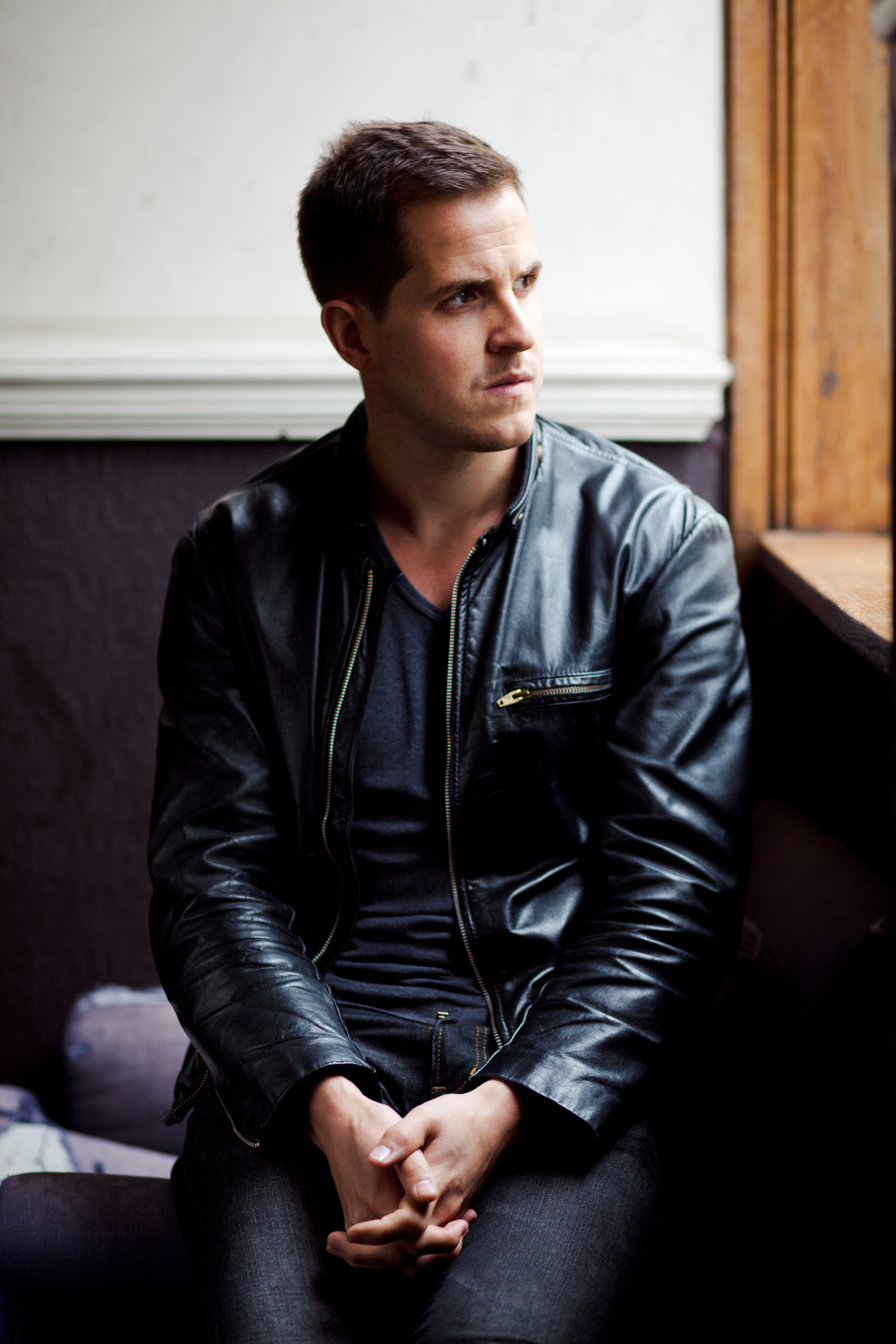
- Jones in 2012
- Born: 27 July 1981 (age 45); Reading, Berkshire, England
- Education: Pembroke College, University of Cambridge (BA)
- Occupations: Popular historian; novelist; television presenter; journalist
- Known for: The Plantagenets (2012); Secrets of Great British Castles (TV series)
- Children: 3

Daniel Gwynne Jones (born 27 July 1981) is a British popular historian, novelist, television presenter, and journalist. He attended Pembroke College, Cambridge.

== Early life and education ==
Jones was born in Reading, England, in 1981 to Welsh parents. He was educated at The Royal Latin School, a state grammar school in Buckingham, before attending Pembroke College, Cambridge, where he achieved a first-class degree in history in 2002.

== Career ==
In 2003, a connection at The Guardian's online sports desk led to an opportunity to cover the Rugby World Cup, after which he wrote for newspapers and magazines. He later became features editor of Men's Health UK magazine. While working there, he wrote much of his first book, Summer of Blood: The Peasants' Revolt of 1381, during leave from his magazine job.

=== Historian ===
Jones's first published history book was a popular narrative history of the English Peasants' Revolt of 1381, titled Summer of Blood: The Peasants' Revolt of 1381, which was published in 2009.

His second book, The Plantagenets: The Kings Who Made England, was published in 2012 in the United Kingdom and a year later in the United States, where it became a New York Times bestseller. The book, which covers the history of the Plantagenet dynasty from Henry II to Richard II, received positive reviews from critics.

Jones's third book, The Hollow Crown: The Wars of the Roses and the Rise of the Tudors published in 2014, picks up where The Plantagenets leaves off and covers the period 1420–1541, from the death of Henry V to the execution of Henry VIII's cousin, Margaret Pole. His fourth book, also published in 2014 is about Magna Carta and is titled Magna Carta: The Making and Legacy of the Great Charter. Jones returned to the Lancasters with his 2024 book, Henry V – The Astonishing Rise of England's Greatest Warrior King.

Jones's next book, The Templars, The Rise and the Spectacular Fall of God's Holy Warriors, was published in September 2017 about the Knights Templar. Jones also worked as a historical consultant on the 2018 History historical drama Knightfall, presenting the official podcast.

In August 2018, he published The Colour of Time: A New History of the World, 1850–1960 illustrated by Marina Amaral. He collaborated with Amaral again in 2020 for the book The World Aflame. Crusaders: The Epic History of the Wars for the Holy Land was published on 5 September 2019. It deals with the Crusades from 1096 onwards. Powers and Thrones: A New History of the Middle Ages was published by Head of Zeus in 2021.

In 2022, Jones started his own podcast through Somethin' Else and Sony Music Entertainment called This Is History: A Dynasty to Die For, recounting much of the content of his 2012 book, The Plantagenets: The Kings Who Made England.

In 2024, he published a book on the rise of the warrior King Henry V of England. The book was one of BBC History Magazine’s Books of the Year.

=== Historical fiction ===
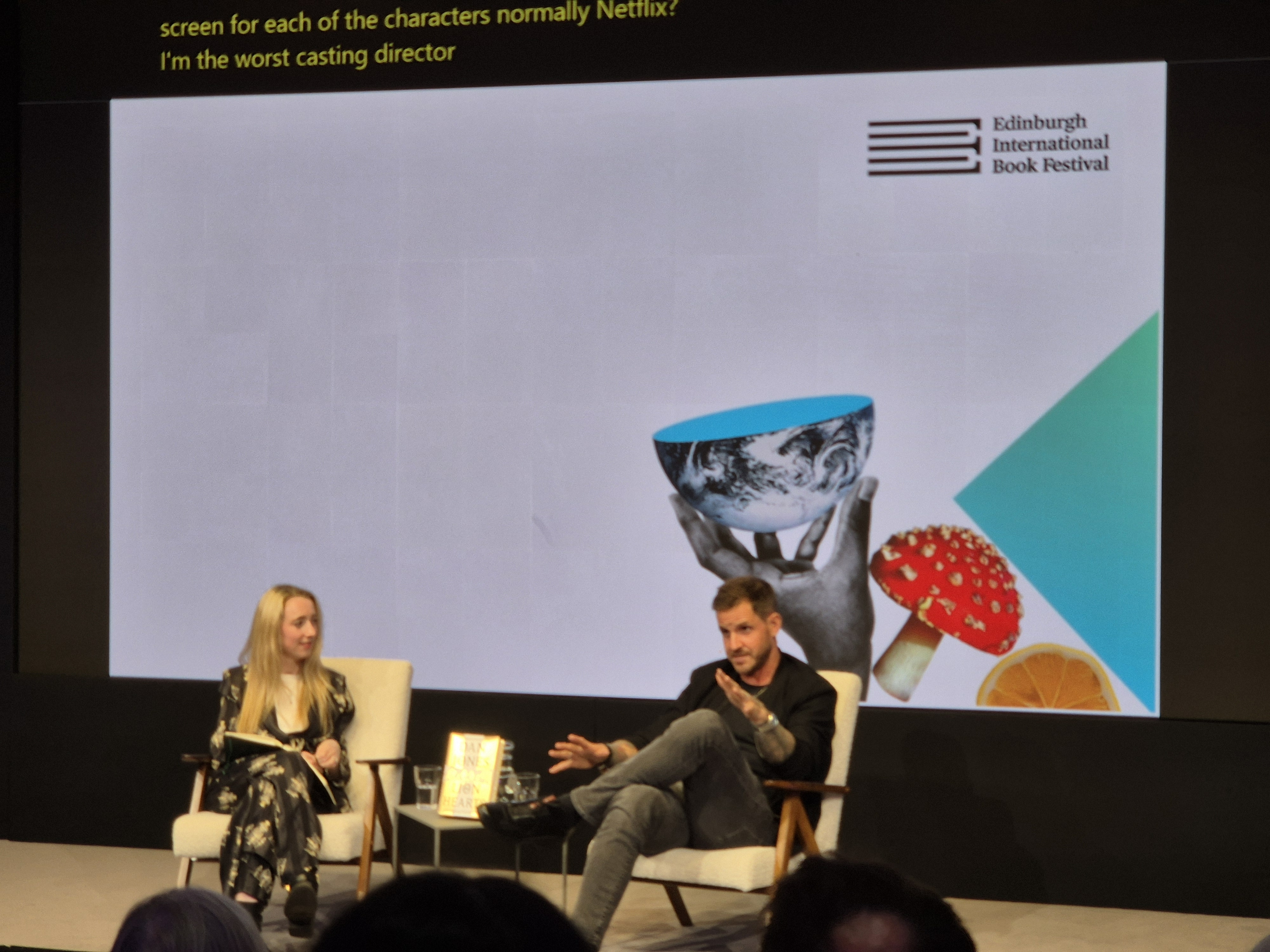
Dan Jones at the 2025 Edinburgh Book Festival being interviewed by Alice Winn on the subject of his third historical fiction book

His first historical fiction debut began with his 2022 book Essex Dogs, which is a part of a trilogy. It details the life of a platoon of archers and men-at-arms during the Hundred Years' War. In January 2024, his second book in the trilogy Wolves of Winter was published. In July 2025, his third volume, concluding the Essex Dogs trilogy was published, entitled Lion Hearts. The last book is set in the aftermath of the Black Death.

=== TV presenter ===
In 2014, Jones's book The Plantagenets was adapted for television as a four-part series on Channel 5 entitled Britain's Bloodiest Dynasty: The Plantagenets.

Jones has also made a twelve-part series for Channel 5, Secrets of Great British Castles.

In April 2016 he co-wrote and co-presented, with Suzannah Lipscomb, Henry VIII and His Six Wives, shown on Channel 5.

In May 2017 he co-wrote and co-presented a three-part docu-drama, Elizabeth I, with Suzannah Lipscomb. It was broadcast on Channel 5.

In May and June 2017, Jones, with Suzannah Lipscomb and engineer Rob Bell, presented The Great Fire, for Channel 5, a series in which the three presenters walked the actual route the Great Fire of London fire took across the city.

In June 2018 he presented a three-part series for Channel 5, Building Britain's Canals. Jones has also made a four-part documentary series entitled Britain's Bloody Crown about the Wars of the Roses. Over 3 weeks in March 2019, Jones presented London: 2,000 Years of History alongside Lipscomb and Bell.

In 2023 he co-presented Sex: A Bonkers History with Amanda Holden.

=== Journalist ===
Jones is a journalist. He is a columnist at the London Evening Standard, where he writes regularly about sport. He has written for The Times, The Sunday Times, The Telegraph, The Spectator, The Daily Beast and Newsweek, The Literary Review, the New Statesman, GQ, BBC History and History Today.

== Personal life ==
Jones lives in Staines-upon-Thames with his wife, two daughters and son.

== Publications ==
=== Non-fiction ===
- Summer of Blood: The Peasants' Revolt of 1381, London, HarperPress, 2009, ISBN 978-0-00-721391-7.
- The Plantagenets: The Kings Who Made England, London, HarperPress, 2012, ISBN 978-0-00-721392-4; also published as The Plantagenets: The Warrior Kings and Queens Who Made England, New York, Viking, 2013, ISBN 978-0670026654.
- The Hollow Crown: The Wars of the Roses and the Rise of the Tudors, London, Faber, 2014, ISBN 978-0571288076; also published as The Wars of the Roses: The Fall of the Plantagenets and the Rise of the Tudors, New York, Viking, 2014, ISBN 978-0-670-02667-8.
- Magna Carta: The Making and Legacy of the Great Charter, London, Head of Zeus, 2014, ISBN 978-1-78185-885-1; also published as Magna Carta: The Birth of Liberty, New York, Viking, 2014 ISBN 978-0-52542-829-9.
- Realm Divided: A Year in the Life of Plantagenet England, London, Head of Zeus, 2016, ISBN 978-1781858837.
- The Templars: The Rise and Fall of God's Holy Warriors, London, Head of Zeus, 2017, ISBN 978-1781858912; also published as The Templars: The Rise and Spectacular Fall of God's Holy Warriors, New York, Viking, 2017, ISBN 978-0525428305.
- The Colour of Time: A New History of the World, 1850–1960, London, Apollo, 2018, ISBN 978-1-78669-268-9.
- Crusaders: An Epic History of the Wars for the Holy Lands, London, Head of Zeus, 2019 ISBN 978-1781858882; also published as Crusaders: The Epic History of the Wars for the Holy Lands, New York, Viking, 2019, ISBN 978-0525428312.
- The World Aflame: The Long War, 1914–1945, London, Apollo, 2020, ISBN 978-1-78854-778-9.
- Powers and Thrones: A New History of the Middle Ages, London, Apollo, 2021, ISBN 978-1789543537.
- The Tale of the Tailor and the Three Dead Kings, London, Head of Zeus, 2021, ISBN 978-1-80110-129-5.
- Henry V: The Astonishing Rise of England's Greatest Warrior King, London, Apollo, 2024, ISBN 978-1804541937; also published as Henry V: The Astonishing Triumph of England's Greatest Warrior King, New York, Viking, 2024, ISBN 978-0593652732.
- Castles: A Fortified History of the World, London, Apollo, 2026, ISBN 978-1035911974

=== Fiction ===
- Essex Dogs, London, Head of Zeus, 2022, ISBN 978-1838937911.
- Wolves of Winter, London, Head of Zeus, 2023, ISBN 978-1838937942.
- Lion Hearts, London, Head of Zeus, 2025, ISBN 978-1838937973.

== Filmography ==
Year	Title	Role	Notes
2014	Britain's Bloodiest Dynasty	Presenter	4 episodes
2015–16	Secrets of Great British Castles	Presenter	12 episodes; co-writer
2016	The Wright Stuff	Guest	episode: "Episode No. 21.4"
2016	Britain's Bloody Crown	Presenter	4 episodes
2016	Henry VIII and His Six Wives	Co-presenter	4 episodes; with Suzannah Lipscomb
2017	1066: A Year to Conquer England	Self / Historian	2 episodes
2017	Elizabeth I	Co-presenter	3 episodes; with Suzannah Lipscomb
2017	The Great Fire: In Real Time	Co-presenter	3 episodes; with Suzannah Lipscomb and Rob Bell
2017–18	Secrets of the National Trust	Guest presenter	5 episodes
2018	Buried: Knights Templar and the Holy Grail	Self / Historian	4 episodes
2018	Building Britain's Canals	Presenter	3 episodes
2018	Christmas University Challenge	Contestant	episode: "Pembroke College, Cambridge v King's London"
2019	London: 2000 Years of History	Co-presenter	4 episodes; with Suzannah Lipscomb and Rob Bell
2020	Walking Britain's Roman Roads	Presenter	6 episodes
2023	Sex: A Bonkers History	Co-presenter	5 episodes
