= The Plantagenets: The Kings Who Made England =

2012 book by Dan Jones

- Cover of the first edition
- Author: Dan Jones
- Language: English
- Subject: Plantagenet Dynasty
- Genre: History
- Publisher: HarperCollins
- Publication date: May 10, 2012
- Publication place: United Kingdom
- Media type: Book
- Pages: 636
- ISBN: 978-0143124924

The Plantagenets: The Kings Who Made England is a history book written by popular historian Dan Jones. It was published in 2012 in the United Kingdom and a year later in the United States as The Plantagenets: The Warrior Kings and Queens Who Made England, where it was listed on the New York Times bestseller list. The book, which covers the history of the Plantagenet dynasty from Henry II to Richard II, received mostly positive reviews from critics.

== Content ==
The Plantagenets: The Kings Who Made England is divided into seven sections, termed by Jones as "ages". These sections successively address periods in the history of the Plantagenet dynasty's rule over England.

== Reception ==
The Plantagenets: The Kings Who Made England was positively received. HistoryNet, in their review of the book, described it as "lively and entertaining" and "a must for those interested in medieval history". Becca Selby, writing in The Manchester Historian, gave a positive review, praising the book's writing style, which she likened to that of a work of historical fiction. David Horspool of The Daily Telegraph gave it five stars out of five, calling it "a great story" and described Jones' writing as inspiring the feel of an "impressively confident guide". Christina Hardyment, in a review in The Independent, gave the book a more measured review, praising the work's characterisation and insight, but finding that its presentation of cycles of prosperity and hardship was confusing, and that it lacked "a proper presentation of the profoundly religious medieval mindset", which made understanding the mindset of the featured kings harder. Ben Wilson, writing in the New Statesman, praised the book, declaring that it described the period "with verve", and that Jones' insights into the nature of medieval rule were good.
