= Kate Williams (historian) =

British historian

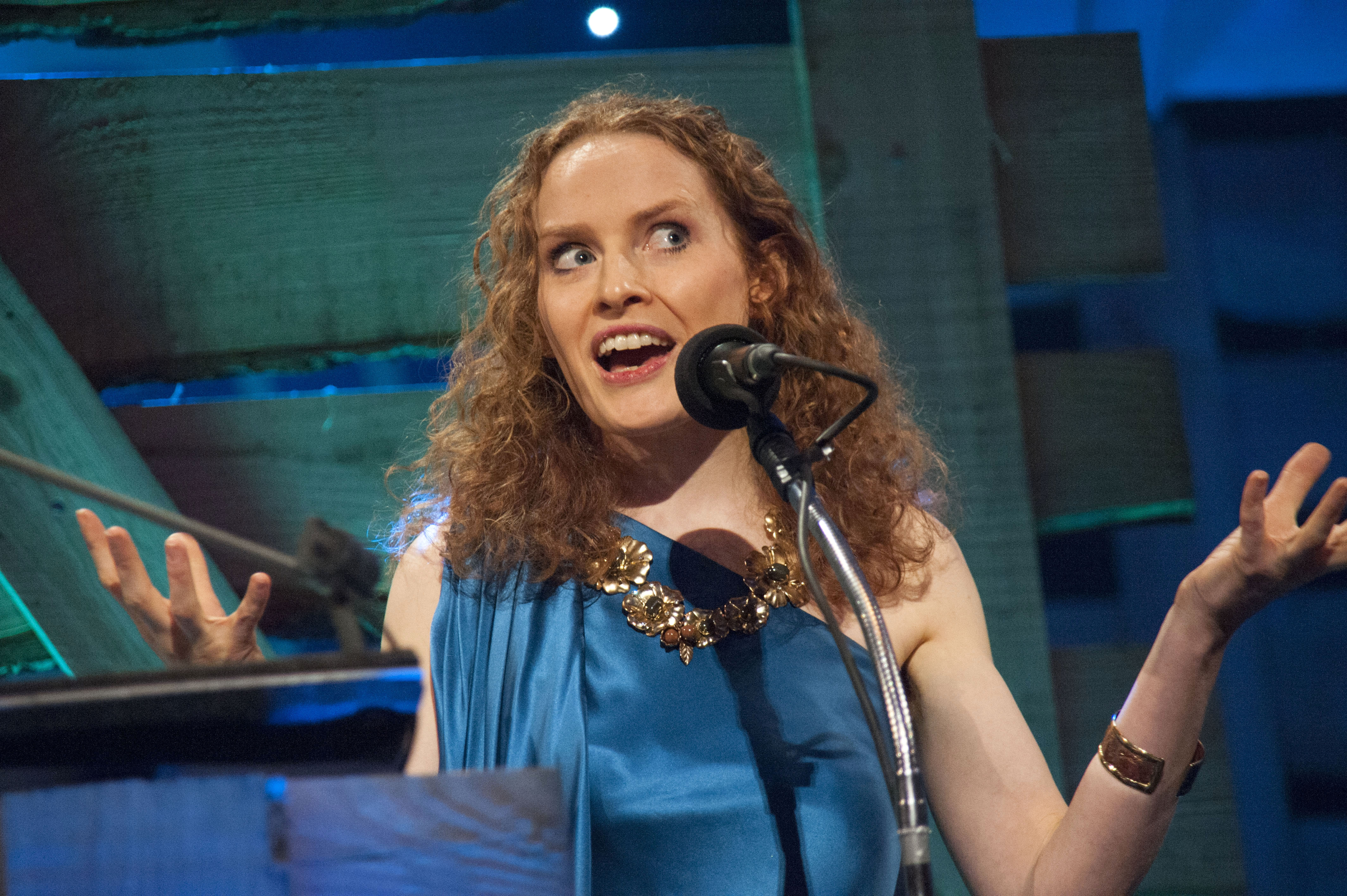
- Williams at the Royal Albert Hall for the 2014 BBC Radio 2 Folk Awards
- Born: 30 November 1974 (age 51)
- Partner: Marcus Gipps
- Children: 1

Academic background
- Education: Somerville College, Oxford, BA and DPhil; Queen Mary, University of London, MA; Royal Holloway, University of London, MA
- Thesis: Samuel Richardson and amatory fiction (2004)
- Doctoral advisor: Tom Keymer

Academic work
- Discipline: History
- Institutions: University of Reading

Kate Williams (born 30 November 1974) is a British historian, author, and television presenter. She is a professor of public engagement with history at the University of Reading.

== Early life and education ==
Williams grew up in Stourbridge. Her father, Gwyn, was a solicitor and her mother, Margaret, was a teacher. Her paternal grandparents were from the Conwy Valley. She was educated at Edgbaston High School for Girls, Birmingham. She studied for her BA and DPhil at Somerville College, Oxford, where she started as a college scholar and received the Violet Vaughan Morgan University Scholarship. She has MAs from Queen Mary, University of London and Royal Holloway, University of London. She began researching Emma Hamilton while studying for her doctorate.

== Career ==
Williams has lectured MA degree studies in Creative Writing at Royal Holloway, University of London. In the summer of 2015, Williams took up a role as Professor of Public Engagement with History at the University of Reading.

=== Journalism and other work ===
Williams writes articles on history for British newspapers including The Daily Telegraph, and reviews for BBC History, History Today and the Financial Times.

In 2010, she was a judge for the Biographer's Club Tony Lothian First Biography Prize, the Book Drum Tournament 2010, and the Litro/IGGY International Young Person's Short Story Award.

A short story, "The Weakness of Hearts", was published in issue 104 of Litro literary magazine.

=== Television and radio ===
Williams appears frequently on radio and TV as a presenter and expert, specialising in social, constitutional and royal history. She commented extensively on the 2011 Royal Wedding and appears often on BBC Breakfast, Newsnight, The Review Show, Sky News, BBC News 24, the Today programme, Broadcasting House, Night Waves, Woman's Hour, Channel Five and various American channels, discussing history and culture and reviewing the news. She covered the Queen's Address to Parliament on BBC One in 2012 and the Queen's Speech for BBC Parliament.

Williams was the social historian on the BBC Two series Restoration Home, which aired from 2011 to 2013. She presented Timewatch: Young Victoria for BBC Two, acclaimed by The Guardian as "telly history at its best" and The Secret History of Edward VII for Channel Five. She appears often on documentaries, discussing history, literature and culture, including Faulks on Fiction and all three series of The Great British Bake Off, as well as documentaries on subjects including Queen Victoria, Balmoral, Sherlock Holmes, Jack the Ripper, Nelson's Trafalgar, Elizabeth II and Hidden Killers of the Victorian Home.

She wrote and presented the documentary The Grandfather of Self-Help, about Samuel Smiles, for Radio 4. She is also the presenter of a Radio 4 documentary on the history of the smile, broadcast in June 2012. Williams was the historian in residence in Frank Skinner's 2014 radio show The Rest Is History. Williams was a regular panellist on The Quizeum, which began airing on BBC4 in spring 2015. Williams was the winner of Celebrity Mastermind which screened on 2 January 2016.

She also featured on episodes of Insert Name Here broadcast on 4 and 25 of January 2016 on BBC Two, and again in four episodes of the second series of Insert Name Here commencing with the Christmas Special on 21 December 2016. Williams appeared in the online mini-series Inside Versailles based on the BBC Television series Versailles. She also appeared in an episode of BBC One comedy panel show Would I Lie To You? in 2016. She was in Dictionary Corner on Countdown for five shows starting 6 October 2016. On 13 December 2016 she appeared as a contestant on Celebrity Antiques Road Trip, partnered with Catherine Southon, against Suzannah Lipscomb and David Harper.

Williams and team member Robin Ince were winners of Pointless Celebrities broadcast on 13 January 2018. In 2020 Williams appeared on Richard Osman's House of Games, broadcast on BBC Two, alongside Chizzy Akudolu, Charlie Higson, and Tom Allen.

In August 2023, Williams appeared in Elizabeth II: Making of a Monarch; a two-part documentary that aired on Channel 4.

Williams was the highest ranked celebrity expert on an episode of the game show The Wheel, which aired on 21 October 2023.

== Live performances ==
In 2026 Williams was joined by historian Suzannah Lipscomb in various cities around the UK to lecture on the rivalry between Queen Elizabeth I and Mary Queen of Scots in To Kill a Queen.

== Personal life ==
Williams and her partner, publisher Marcus Gipps, have a teenage child.

== Bibliography ==
=== Non-fiction ===
- England's Mistress, a biography of Emma Hamilton, was published by Random House in the UK and US ISBN 978-0-09-179474-3. It was short-listed for the Marsh/English Speaking Union Prize for the best biography of 2005–06, was selected as a Book of the Year in The Times and The Independent, and broadcast as Book of the Week on BBC Radio 4. A film adaptation is in production with Picture Palace.
- Becoming Queen, about the youth of Queen Victoria and her cousin, Princess Charlotte Augusta of Wales, was published in 2008 by Hutchinson ISBN 978-0-09-179479-8. It was serialised in The Sunday Telegraph and was a Book of the Year in The Spectator and Tatler. The Times selected it as one of the Top 50 Paperbacks of 2009.
- Josephine: Desire, Ambition, Napoleon looks at the life of Joséphine de Beauharnais and was published in 2013.
- Young Elizabeth: The Making of Our Queen, a biography of the formative years of Queen Elizabeth II ISBN 978-0-297-86781-4. It was published by Weidenfeld & Nicolson in May 2012. The audio book version is read by Williams herself.
- Rival Queens looks at the lives of Elizabeth I and Mary, Queen of Scots ISBN 978-0-091-93670-9.
- The Ring and the Crown: A History of Royal Weddings 1066–2011, co-authors Alison Weir, Tracy Borman and Sarah Gristwood, published by Random House. Serialised in The Daily Telegraph.
- The Royal Palaces: Secrets and Scandals, published by Orion on 27 June 2024. ISBN 978-0-71-126939-2
- Regina: A New History of Women and Power published by Orion in 2026. ISBN 978-1-47-462135-9

=== Novels ===
- The Pleasures of Men, novel about a young girl obsessed with a serial killer in Spitalfields in 1840, was published (2012) by Penguin Books in the UK and Disney Hyperion in the US, Canada, Italy, and the Netherlands ISBN 978-0-241-95139-2.
- The Storms of War, novel published in 2014 by Orion. Set during the First World War, the novel follows the lives of an Anglo-German family struggling to survive the home front. Once popular with their neighbours, they are now shunned by society which affects each member individually. Despite these differences, their effort towards the war on the British side does not waver and through these war experiences they learn some of the most valuable lessons in life and family relationships. A review in The Independent outlines the essence of William's novel, and ends with high acclaim for her second piece of fiction.
- The Edge of the Fall, published in November 2015 by Orion.
- The House of Shadows, published by Orion on 26 July 2018.

=== Essays ===
- "The Force of Language and the Sweets of Love: Eliza Haywood and the Erotics of Reading in Samuel Richardson's Clarissa" in Lumen.
- (Chapter) "Nelson and Women" in Admiral Lord Nelson: Context & Legacy, ed. David Cannadine. (2005): ISBN 978-1-4039-3906-7
- "Reading Tristram Shandy in the Brothel" in The Shandean, 16.
- "Passion in Translation: 1720s Amatory Writers and the Novel" in Remapping the Rise of the Novel, ed. Jenny Mander.
- "The Rise of the Novel" in The History of British Women's Writing 1690–1750, ed. Ros Ballaster. (2010): ISBN 978-0-230-54938-8
- (Co-author) The Ring and The Crown: A History of Royal Weddings 1066–2011 (2011): ISBN 978-0-09-194377-6
