= Francis of Assisi =

Italian Catholic saint (1181–1226)

Saint Francis of Assisi OFM
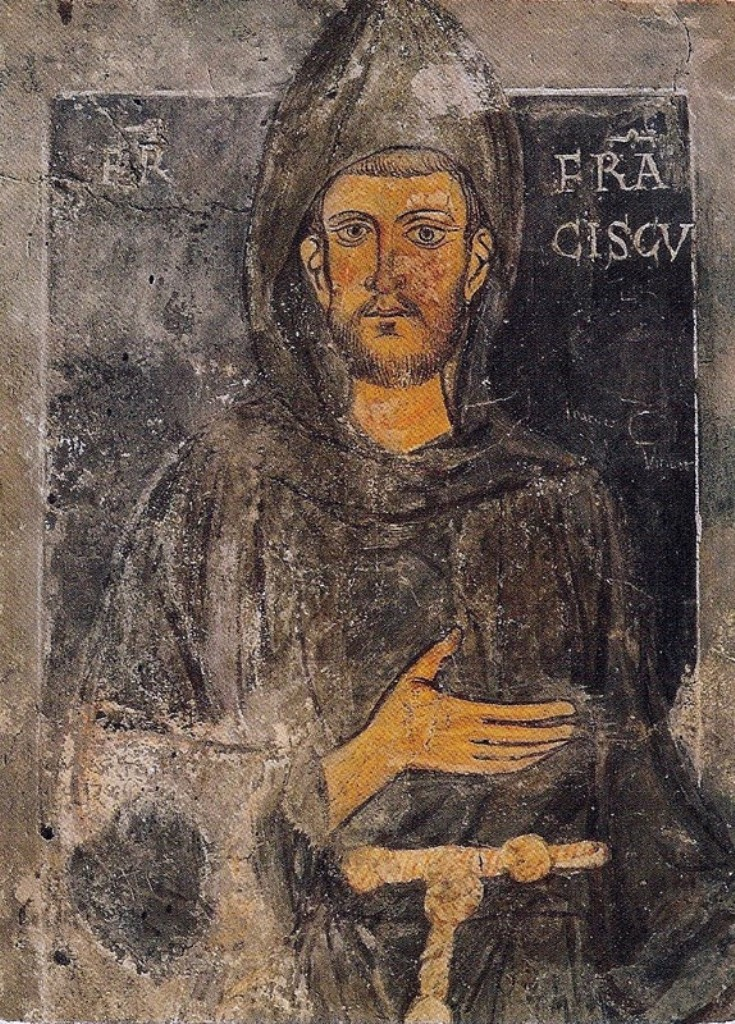
- Fresco of Francis near the entrance of the Benedictine abbey of Subiaco. Painted between March 1228 and March 1229, it is the oldest surviving depiction of the Saint. (Note: He is depicted without the stigmata, but the image is a religious image and not a portrait. The tunic he actually wore was simpler. It reportedly was made by himself to be unattractive and uncomfortable, unlike modern Franciscan habits.)

Founder of the Franciscan Order; Confessor of the Faith and Stigmatist
- Born: Giovanni di Pietro di Bernardone; 19 August 1181; Assisi, Duchy of Spoleto, Holy Roman Empire
- Died: 3 October 1226 (aged approximately 44 years); Assisi, Umbria, Papal States
- Venerated in: Roman Catholic Church; Anglicanism; Lutheranism; Old Catholic Church; Skanda Vale
- Canonized: 16 July 1228, Assisi by Pope Gregory IX
- Major shrine: Basilica of San Francesco d'Assisi, Assisi, Italy
- Feast: 4 October
- Attributes: Franciscan habit, birds, animals, stigmata, crucifix, book and a skull
- Patronage: Franciscan Order; poor people; peace; ecology; animals; stowaways; merchants; needlemakers; Aguada, Puerto Rico; Naga, Cebu; Buhi, Camarines Sur; Balamban, Cebu; Dumanjug, Cebu; General Trias, Cavite and Italy

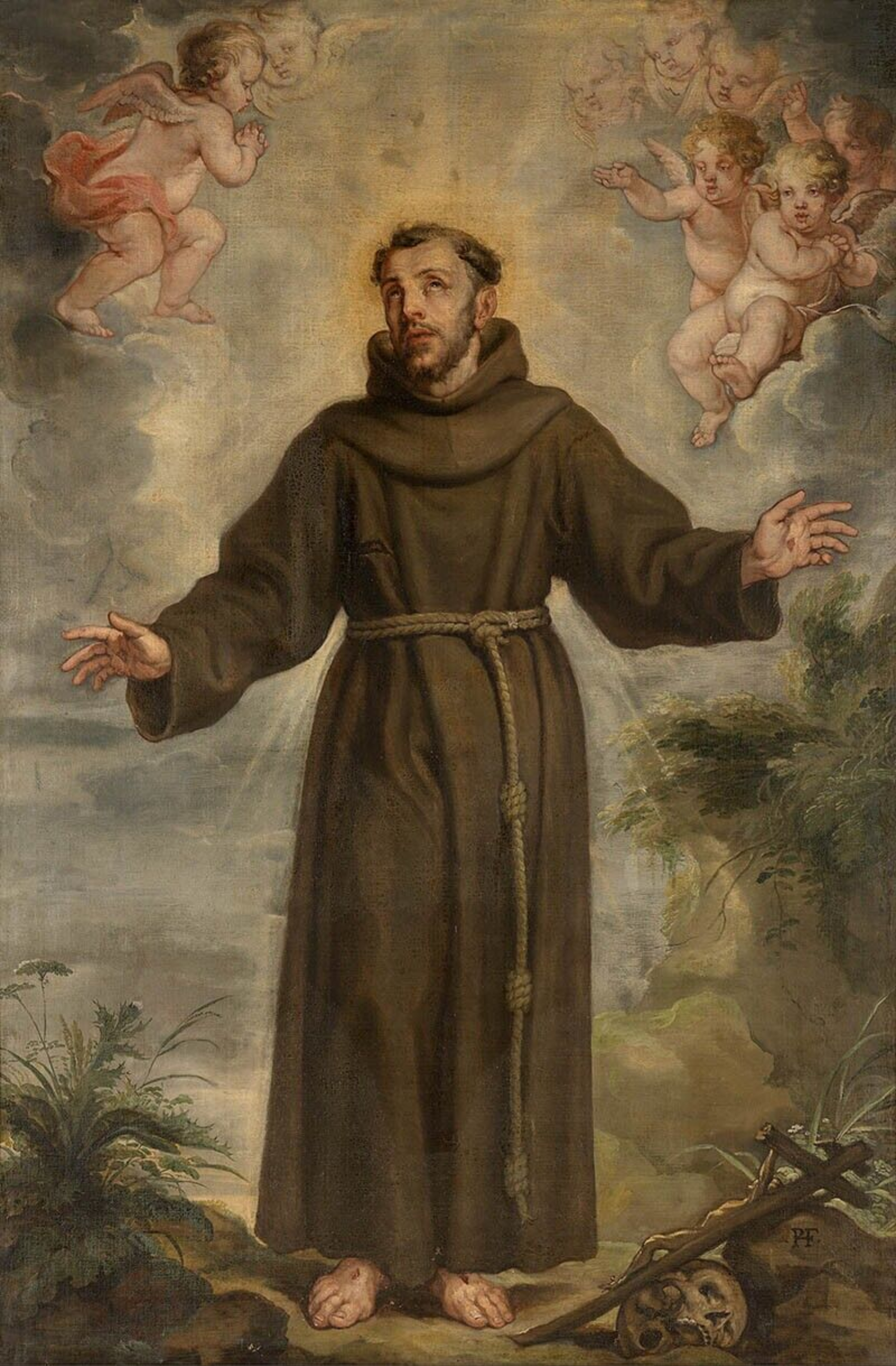
Heilige Franciscus van Assisi, by Philip Fruytiers

Giovanni di Pietro di Bernardone (c. 19 August 1181 – 3 October 1226), venerated as Saint Francis of Assisi (Italian: Francesco d'Assisi), was an Italian (Note: Though an Italian nation state had yet to be established, the Latin equivalent of the term Italian (italus) had been in use for natives of the region since antiquity. For example in Pliny the Elder, Letters 9.23.) mystic, poet and Catholic friar who founded the religious order of the Franciscans.

Born into a wealthy family in Assisi, Italy, he was inspired towards a life of poverty and religious devotion as a young man and began his efforts by repairing chapels and caring for the sick in his hometown. Soon after, he gathered a band of followers in the city who joined in his lifestyle, and following a journey to Rome to meet Pope Innocent III, he received approval for the foundation of the Order of Friars Minor, which is commonly known as the Franciscan Order.

Under his leadership, the order rapidly increased in size. Notable events in his religious career include his meeting with Clare of Assisi, who founded the Second Order of St. Francis commonly known as the Poor Clares, his journey to Egypt in 1219 in an attempt to convert the sultan Al-Kamil and put an end to the conflict of the Fifth Crusade, and his arrangement of the first live nativity scene as part of the annual Christmas celebration in Greccio. According to Christian tradition, Francis displayed stigmata resembling the wounds on the hands and feet of crucified Christ during the apparition of a seraphic angel in a religious ecstasy in 1224 and died two years later in 1226 at the age of 44.

One of the most venerated figures in Christianity, Francis was canonized by Pope Gregory IX on 16 July 1228. He is commonly portrayed wearing a brown habit with a rope tied around his waist, featuring three knots symbolizing the evangelical counsels of poverty, chastity, and obedience. Francis is associated with patronage of animals and the environment and, along with Catherine of Siena, is patron saint of Italy.

== Names ==
Francis (Italian: Francesco d'Assisi; Latin: Franciscus Assisiensis) was named Giovanni by his mother. The rest of his birth name is a patronymic from his father, Pietro di Bernardone, as was the usage of the time among upper classes. His father was in France on business when Francis was born in Assisi, a small town in Umbria, central Italy. Upon his return, Pietro took to calling his son Francesco ('Free man' or 'Frenchman'), possibly in honour of his commercial success and enthusiasm for all things French, or because the mother herself was French.

== Biography ==
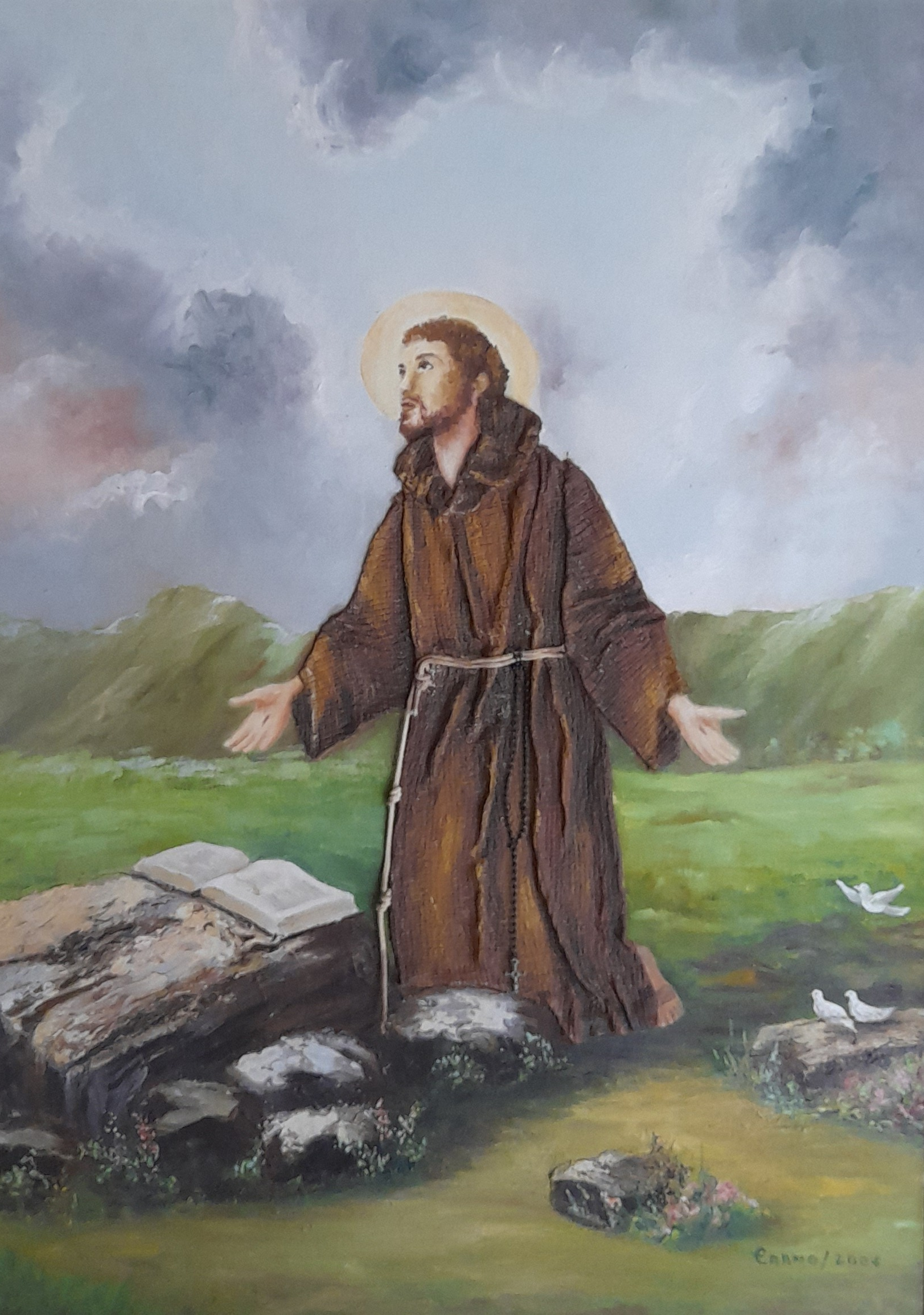
São Francisco das Chagas, by Ducarmo Teles

=== Early life ===
Francis of Assisi was born c. 1181, one of the children of an Italian father, Pietro di Bernardone dei Moriconi, a prosperous silk merchant, and a French mother, Pica di Bourlemont, about whom little is known except that she was a noblewoman originally from Provence.

Indulged by his parents, Francis lived a high-spirited life, typical of a wealthy young man. As a youth, he became a devotee of troubadours and was fascinated with all things Transalpine. Francis was handsome, witty, gallant and delighted in fine clothes. He spent money lavishly. Although many hagiographers remark about Francis' bright clothing, rich friends, and love of pleasures, his displays of disillusionment toward the world that surrounded Francis came fairly early in his life, as is shown in the "story of the beggar". In this account, Francis was selling cloth and velvet in the marketplace on behalf of his father when a beggar came to him and asked for alms. At the end of his business deal, Francis abandoned his wares and ran after the beggar. When he found him, Francis gave the man everything he had in his purse. Francis' friends mocked him for his charity while his father scolded him in rage.

Around 1202, Francis joined a military expedition against Perugia and was taken as a prisoner at Collestrada. He spent a year as a captive, during which an illness caused Francis to re-evaluate his life. However, upon his return to Assisi in 1203, Francis returned to his carefree life. Two years later, Francis left for Apulia to enlist in the army of Walter III, Count of Brienne. A strange vision made him return to Assisi and lose interest in worldly life. According to hagiographic accounts, thereafter Francis began to avoid the sports and feasts of his former companions. A friend asked him whether he was thinking of marrying, to which Francis answered: "Yes, a fairer bride than any of you have ever seen", meaning his "Lady Poverty".

On a pilgrimage to Rome, Francis joined the poor in begging at St. Peter's Basilica. He spent some time in lonely places, asking God for divine illumination. Francis said that he had a mystical vision of Jesus Christ in the forsaken country chapel of San Damiano, just outside Assisi, in which the Icon of Christ Crucified said to him, "Francis, Francis, go and repair My church which, as you can see, is falling into ruins." Francis took this to mean the ruined church in which he was presently praying, so Francis sold some cloth taken from his father's store to assist the priest there. When the priest refused to accept the ill-gotten gains, an indignant Francis threw the coins on the floor.

In order to avoid his father's wrath, Francis hid in a cave near San Damiano for about a month. When he returned to town, hungry and dirty, Francis was dragged home by his father, beaten, bound, and locked in a small storeroom. Freed by his mother during Bernardone's absence, Francis returned at once to San Damiano, where he found shelter with the officiating priest, but Francis was soon cited before the city consuls by his father. The latter, not content with having recovered the scattered gold from San Damiano, sought also to force his son to forgo his inheritance by way of restitution. In the midst of legal proceedings before the Bishop of Assisi, Francis renounced his father and his patrimony. Some accounts report that Francis stripped himself naked in token of this renunciation and the bishop covered him with his own cloak.

For the next couple of months, Francis wandered as a beggar in the hills behind Assisi. He spent some time at a neighbouring monastery working as a scullion. Francis then went to Gubbio, where a friend gave him alms, the cloak, girdle and staff of a pilgrim. Returning to Assisi, Francis traversed the city, begging stones for the restoration of St. Damiano. These he carried to the old chapel, set in place himself, and rebuilt it over time. Over the course of two years, Francis embraced the life of a penitent, during which he restored several ruined chapels in the countryside around Assisi, among them San Pietro in Spina (in the area of San Petrignano in the valley about a kilometre from modern Rivotorto, on private property and once again in ruin); and the Porziuncola, the little chapel of St. Mary of the Angels in the plain just below the town. This later became Francis' favorite abode. By degrees, he took to nursing lepers, in the leper colonies near Assisi.

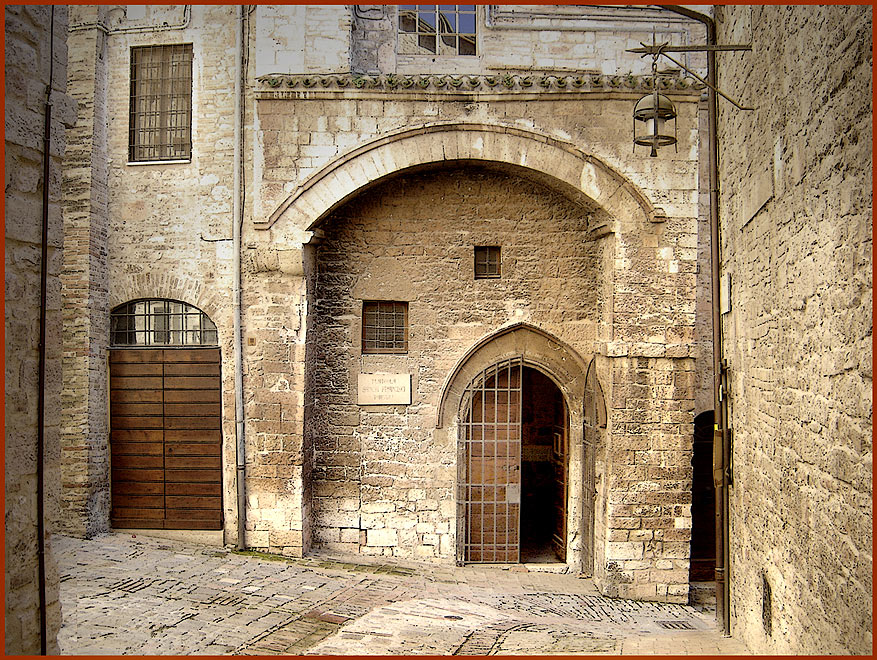
The Piccolino Chapel, Francis' legendary birthplace

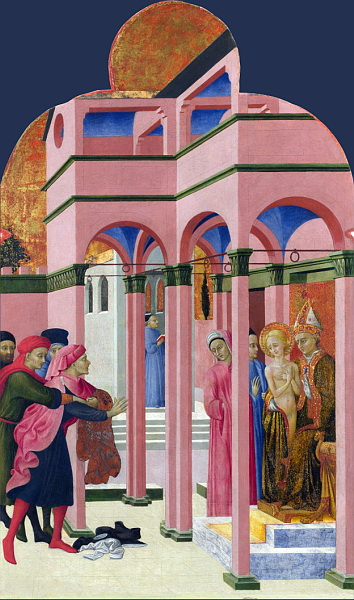
Saint Francis renounces his earthly father.

=== Founding of the Franciscan Order ===
==== Order of Friars Minor (OFM) ====
One morning in February 1208, Francis was taking part in a Mass in the chapel of St. Mary of the Angels, near which he had by then built himself a hut. The Gospel of the day was the "Commissioning of the Twelve" from the Book of Matthew, in which Jesus' disciples are commissioned to go and proclaim that the Kingdom of God is at hand. Francis was inspired to devote himself to a life of poverty. Having obtained a coarse woollen tunic, the dress then worn by the poorest Umbrian peasants, Francis tied it around himself with a knotted rope and went about exhorting the people of the countryside to penance, brotherly love and peace. His preaching to ordinary people was unusual as Francis had no license to do so.

Francis' example attracted others. Within a year, he had 11 followers. The brothers lived a simple life in the deserted leper colony of Rivo Torto near Assisi. They spent much of their time wandering through the mountainous districts of Umbria, and through their earnestness toward people they encountered, often deeply impressed them.

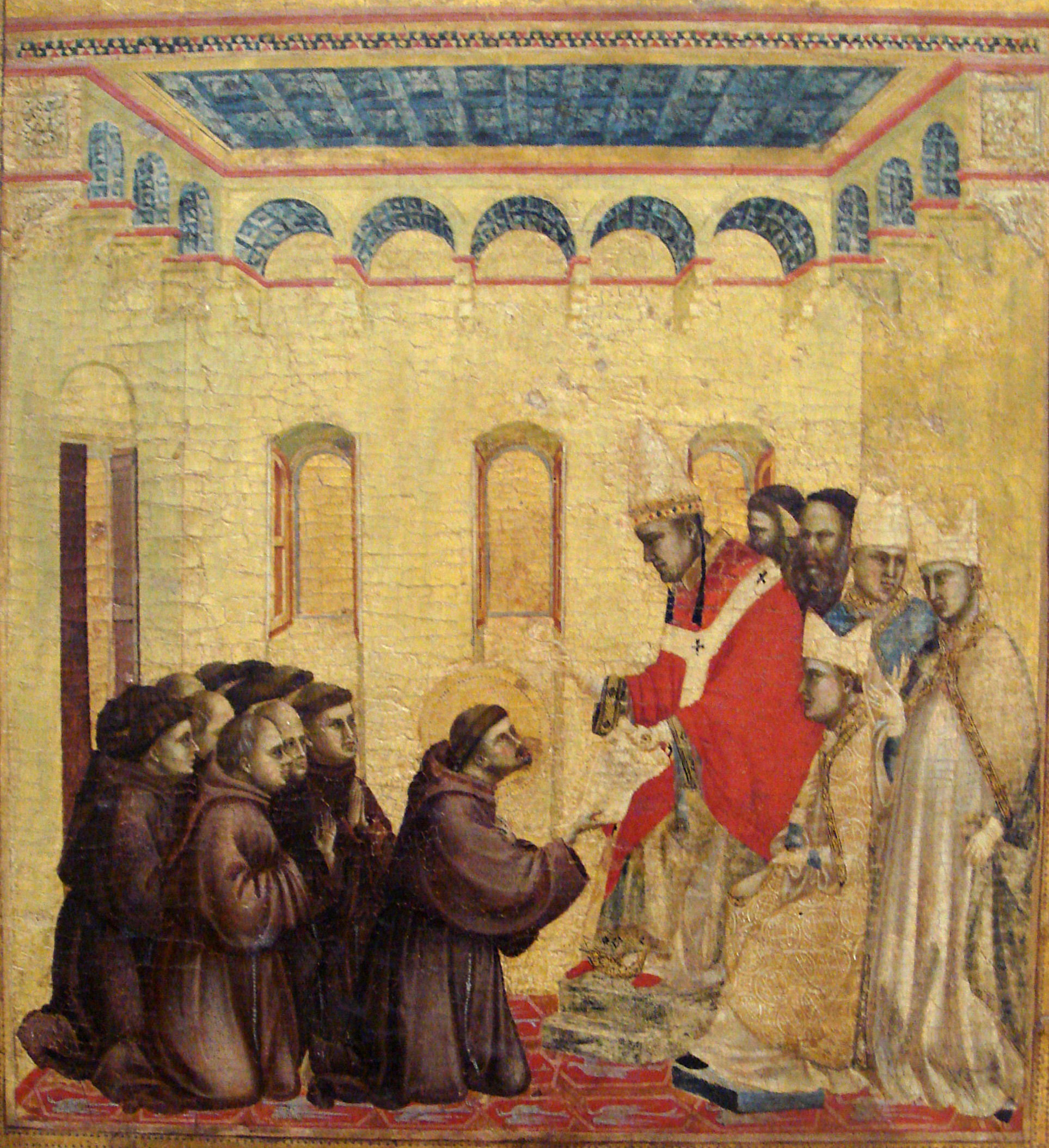
Pope Innocent III approving the statutes of the Order of the Franciscans, by Giotto

In 1209, Francis composed a simple rule for his followers ("friars"), the Regula primitiva or "Primitive Rule", which came from verses in the Bible. The rule was "to follow the teachings of our Lord Jesus Christ and to walk in his footsteps." He then led 11 followers to Rome to seek permission from Pope Innocent III to found a new religious order. Upon entry to Rome, the brothers encountered Bishop Guido of Assisi, who had in his company Giovanni di San Paolo, the Cardinal Bishop of Sabina. The Cardinal, who was the confessor of Pope Innocent III, was immediately sympathetic to Francis and agreed to represent Francis to the Pope. After several days, the Pope agreed to admit the group informally, adding that when God increased the group in grace and number, they could return for an official audience. The group was tonsured.

Seeking the pope's authority was important because it demonstrated Francis's recognition of the Church's authority, preventing his followers from accusations of heresy, as had happened to the Waldensians decades earlier. The pope initially hesitated, but after he had a dream in which he saw Francis holding up the Lateran Basilica, he endorsed his order via oral approbation. Per tradition, this occurred on 16 April 1210 and constituted the official founding of the Franciscan Order. The group, then the "Lesser Brothers" (Order of Friars Minor also known as the Franciscan Order or the Seraphic Order), were centred in the Porziuncola and preached first in Umbria, before expanding throughout Italy. Francis was later ordained a deacon, but not a priest.

==== Poor Clares and Third Order ====
From then on, the new order grew quickly. Hearing Francis preaching in the church of San Rufino in Assisi in 1211, the young noblewoman Clare of Assisi sought to live like them. Her cousin Rufino also sought to join. On the night of Palm Sunday, 28 March 1212, Clare clandestinely left her family's palace. Francis received her at the Porziuncola and thereby established the Order of Poor Clares. He gave Clare a religious habit, a garment similar to his own, before lodging her, her younger sister Caterina, and other young women in a nearby monastery of Benedictine nuns until Francis could provide a suitable monastery. Later, he transferred them to San Damiano, to a few small huts or cells. This became the first monastery of the Second Franciscan Order, currently known as Poor Clares.

For those who could not leave their affairs, Francis later formed the Third Order of Brothers and Sisters of Penance, a fraternity composed of either laity or clergy whose members neither withdrew from the world nor took religious vows. Instead, they observed the principles of Franciscan life in their daily lives. Before long, the Third Order – currently titled the Secular Franciscan Order – grew beyond Italy.

=== Missionary work during the Fifth Crusade ===
In the late spring of 1212, Francis set out for Jerusalem, but was shipwrecked by a storm on the Dalmatian coast, forcing him to return to Italy. On 8 May 1213, Francis was given the use of the mountain of La Verna (Alverna) as a gift from Count Orlando di Chiusi, who described it as "eminently suitable for whoever wishes to do penance in a place remote from mankind". The mountain would become one of his favourite retreats for prayer.

During the Fifth Crusade in 1219, Francis went to Egypt where a Crusader army had been encamped for over a year besieging the walled city of Damietta. He was accompanied by Friar Illuminatus of Arce and hoped to convert the Sultan of Egypt or be martyred in the attempt. The Sultan, Al-Kamil, a nephew of Saladin, had succeeded his father as Sultan of Egypt in 1218 and was encamped upstream of Damietta. A bloody and futile attack on the city was launched by the Christians on 29 August 1219, following which both sides agreed to a ceasefire that lasted four weeks. Probably during this interlude, Francis and his companion crossed the Muslims' lines and were brought before the Sultan, remaining in his camp for a few days. Reports give no information about what transpired during the encounter beyond noting that the Sultan received Francis graciously and that Francis preached to the Muslims. He returned unharmed. (Note: e.g., Jacques de Vitry, Letter 6 February or March 1220 and Historia orientalis (c. 1223–1225) cap. XXII; Tommaso da Celano, Vita prima (1228), §57: the relevant passages are quoted in an English translation in Tolan 2009, pp. 19– and Tolan 2009, p. 54 respectively.) No known Arab sources mention the visit.

According to some late sources, the Sultan gave Francis permission to visit the sacred places in the Holy Land and even to preach there. All that can safely be asserted is that Francis and his companion left the Crusader camp for Acre, from where they embarked for Italy in the latter half of 1220. Drawing on a 1267 sermon by Bonaventure, later sources report that the Sultan secretly converted or accepted a death-bed baptism as a result of meeting Francis. (Note: For grants of various permissions and privileges to Francis as attributed by later sources, see, e.g., Tolan 2009, pp. 258–263. The first mention of the Sultan's conversion occurs in a sermon delivered by Bonaventure on 4 October 1267. See Tolan 2009, p. 168)

Whatever transpired as a result of Francis' and al-Kamil's meeting the Franciscans have maintained a presence in the Holy Land almost uninterrupted since 1217 and remain there (see Custody of the Holy Land). They received concessions from the Mameluke Sultan in 1333 with regard to certain Holy Places in Jerusalem and Bethlehem and (so far as concerns the Catholic Church) jurisdictional privileges from Pope Clement VI in 1342.

=== Reorganization of the Franciscan Order ===
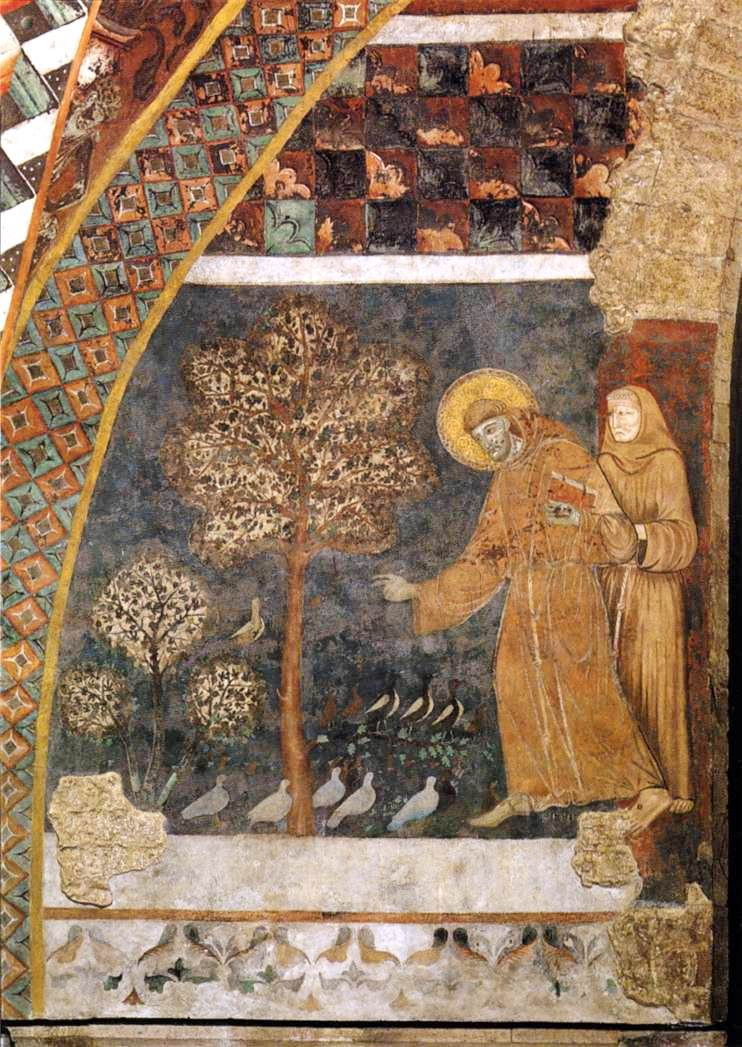
Saint Francis Preaching to the Birds outside of Bevagna (by Master of St. Francis)

The growing order of friars was divided into provinces; groups were sent to France, Germany, Hungary and Spain and to the East. Upon receiving a report of the martyrdom of five brothers in Morocco, Francis returned to Italy via Venice. Cardinal Ugolino di Conti was then nominated by the pope as the protector of the order. Another reason for Francis' return to Italy was that the Franciscan Order had grown at an unprecedented rate compared to previous religious orders, but its organizational sophistication had not kept up with this growth and had little more to govern it than Francis' example and simple rule. To address this problem, Francis prepared a new and more detailed Rule, the "First Rule" or "Rule Without a Papal Bull" (Regula prima, Regula non bullata), which again asserted devotion to poverty and the apostolic life. However, it also introduced a greater institutional structure, though this was never officially endorsed by the pope.

Brother Peter was succeeded by Brother Elias as Vicar of Francis. Two years later, Francis modified the "First Rule", creating the "Second Rule" or "Rule With a Bull", which was approved by Pope Honorius III on 29 November 1223. As the order's official rule, it called on the friars "to observe the Holy Gospel of our Lord Jesus Christ, living in obedience without anything of our own and in chastity". In addition, it set regulations for discipline, preaching and entering the order. Once the rule was endorsed by the pope, Francis withdrew increasingly from external affairs. In 1221 and 1222, he crossed Italy, first as far south as Catania in Sicily and afterwards as far north as Bologna.

=== Stigmata, final days and sainthood ===
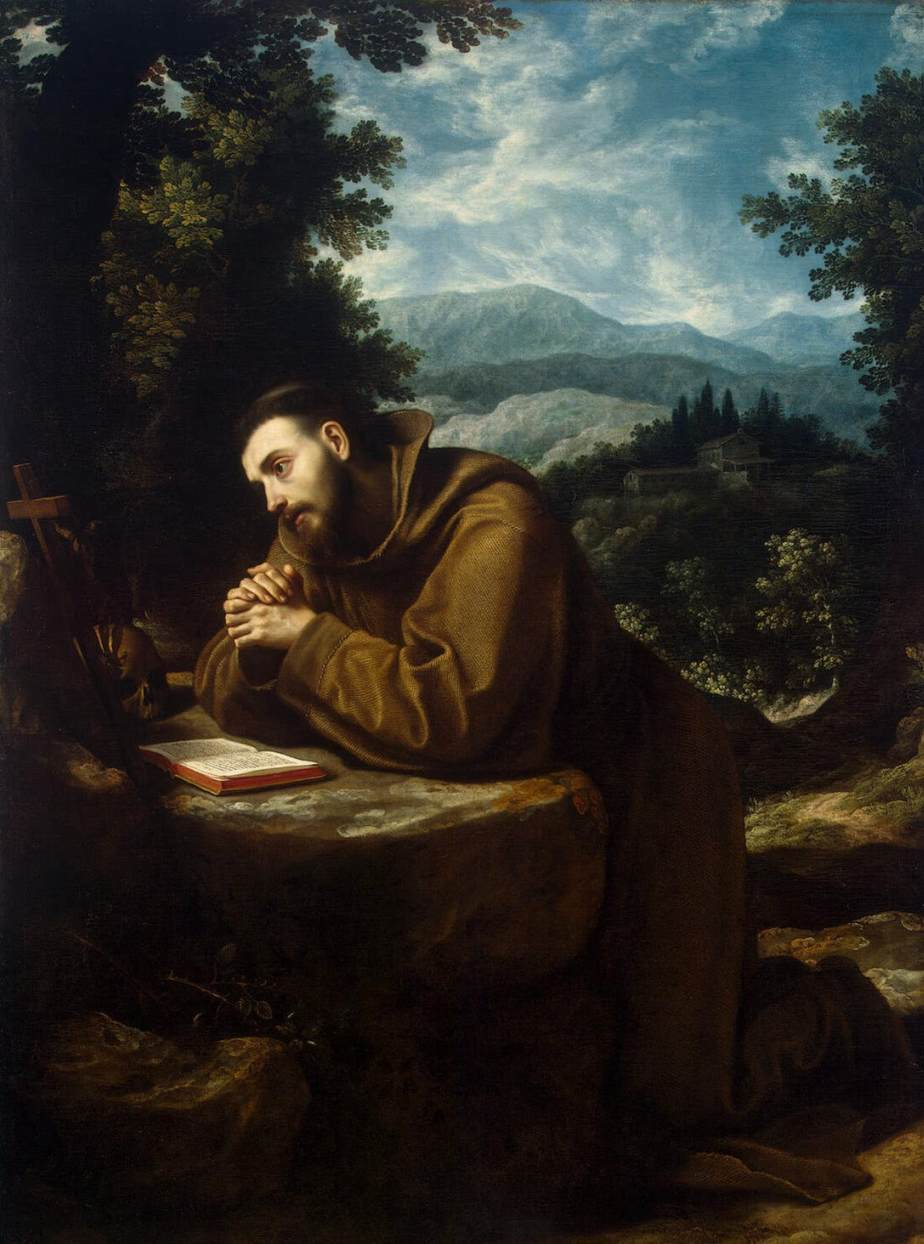
Francis considered his stigmata part of the Imitation of Christ. by Cigoli, 1699

While Francis was praying on the mountain of Verna, during a 40-day fast in preparation for Michaelmas (29 September), he is said to have had a vision on 17 September 1224, three days after the feast of the Exaltation of the Cross, following which Francis displayed stigmata resembling the wounds on the hands and feet of crucified Christ. Brother Leo, who had been with Francis at the time, left a clear and simple account of the event, the first definite account of the phenomenon of stigmata. "Suddenly he saw a vision of a seraph, a six-winged angel on a cross. This angel gave him the gift of the five wounds of Christ." The apparent stigmata have been thought to be due to purpura on the hands and feet, a known complication of the quartan malaria Francis is thought to have suffered from.

Suffering from these stigmata and from trachoma, Francis received care in several cities (Siena, Cortona, Nocera) to no avail. He began to go blind and the bishop of Ostia ordered that his eyes be operated on which meant cauterizing the eyes with hot irons. Francis claims to have felt nothing at all when this was done. In the end, he was brought back to a hut next to the Porziuncola. Here, Francis spent his last days dictating his spiritual testament. Francis died on the evening of Saturday, 3 October 1226, singing Psalm 141, "Voce mea ad Dominum". On 16 July 1228, Francis was declared a saint by Pope Gregory IX (the former cardinal Ugolino di Conti, a friend of Francis and Cardinal Protector of the Order). The next day, the pope laid the foundation stone for the Basilica of St. Francis in Assisi. Francis was buried on 25 May 1230, under the Lower Basilica, but his tomb was soon hidden on orders of Brother Elias to protect it from Saracen invaders. Francis' burial place remained unknown until it was rediscovered in 1818. Pasquale Belli then constructed a crypt for the remains in the Lower Basilica. It was refashioned between 1927 and 1930 into its present form by Ugo Tarchi. In 1978, the remains of Francis were examined and confirmed by a commission of scholars appointed by Pope Paul VI and put into a glass urn in the ancient stone tomb. His skeleton was put on public display for the first time in 2026.

Saint Francis of Assisi in wilderness (1638).

In 1935, Edward Frederick Hartung concluded that Francis had probably contracted trachoma while in Egypt, and had died, aged 45, of quartan malaria. This interpretation was published in the Annals of Medical History.

== Works ==
==== Rules and Exhortations ====
- Earlier Rule (Regula non bullata): first rule of the Friars Minor, written around 1221 and much longer than the subsequent one. It is filled with evangelical citations, contains spiritual exhortations, and never received formal approval from the Pope.
- Later Rule (Regula bullata): definitive rule of the order, consisting of twelve chapters, approved by Pope Honorius III with the bull Solet annuere on 29 November 1223. It is a shorter and more sober legal text than the earlier rule.
- Testament (Testamentum): text dictated by Francis near the end of his life. It recalls his conversion and his encounter with the lepers, and advises the friars to observe the rule without adding glosses to it.
- Rule for Hermitages (Regula pro eremitoriis): brief text that regulates the life of small fraternities living in secluded places, featuring a distribution of roles between "mothers" and "sons" along with designated times for prayer.
- Writings to the Poor Ladies: short texts addressed to Clare and the sisters of San Damiano, including a form of life and a last will, expressing Francis's care for their community.
- Admonitions (Admonitiones): collection of twenty-eight short spiritual sayings addressed to the friars on obedience, poverty, humility, charity, and evangelical life.

==== Letters ====
- Letter to the Faithful (Epistola ad fideles): exhortation to penance addressed to Christians in general. It survives in two recensions, a shorter first version and a more developed second version.
- Letter to the Clergy (Epistola ad clericos): invites priests to treat the Eucharist and liturgical words with reverence. It also exists in two recensions.
- Letter to the Rulers of the Peoples (Epistola ad populorum rectores): exhorts rulers to be mindful of their death and to give honor to the Lord.
- Letter to the Entire Order (Epistola toti ordini): addressed to the friars gathered in chapter; it exhorts them to Eucharistic reverence, obedience, and fidelity to the rule.
- Letter to a Minister: brief letter dealing with forgiveness and mercy toward friars who have sinned.
- Letter to the Custodians: brief letter dealing with the veneration of the Eucharist and of the words of the Lord.
- Letter to Brother Leo (Epistola ad fratrem Leonem): short autograph note offering advice to his companion Leo. It is preserved in Spoleto Cathedral.
- Letter to Brother Anthony (Epistola ad fratrem Antonium): brief letter in which Francis authorizes Anthony to t*each theology to the friars, on the condition that he does not extinguish the spirit of prayer.
- Letter to Lady Jacoba (Epistola ad dominam Iacobam): brief note to Jacoba of Settesoli, a Roman noblewoman and friend of Francis, written in the final days of his life asking her to come to him.

==== Praises and Prayers ====
- Prayer in front of the Crucifix of San Damiano (Oratio ante crucifixum): brief prayer traditionally associated with the San Damiano cross, in which Francis asks for light, faith, hope, and charity.
- Salutation of the Virtues (Salutatio virtutum): poetic composition greeting the virtues (wisdom, simplicity, poverty, humility, charity, and obedience) and presenting them as "ladies".
- Salutation of the Blessed Virgin Mary (Salutatio beatae Mariae Virginis): brief hymn in which Francis greets Mary as "Lady, Holy Queen" and Mother of God.
- Praises of the Most High God (Laudes Dei Altissimi): series of acclamations to God, preserved on an autograph parchment (the Chartula of Assisi), with annotations by Brother Leo.
- Blessing for Brother Leo (Benedictio fratri Leoni): formula of blessing, inspired by the Book of Numbers, written on the reverse side of the same parchment.
- Canticle of Brother Sun (Cantico di frate Sole): famous praise of God through his creatures, composed in the Umbrian vernacular toward the end of his life. It is considred one of the earliest literary works in Italian.
- Audite poverelle: brief song in the vernacular addressed to Clare and her sisters, containing an exhortation to perseverance in the evangelical life.
- Praises to be Said at All the Hours (Laudes ad omnes horas dicendae): formula of praise to be recited throughout the hours of the day.
- Exhortation to the Praise of God (Exhortatio ad laudem Dei): brief text in which Francis invites all beings, both humans and creatures, to bless God.
- A Paraphrase of the Our Father (Expositio in Pater noster): devotional commentary glossing the Lord's Prayer phrase by phrase.
- Absorbeat (Absorbeat): prayer asking to be absorbed by the love of Christ. Its attribution to Francis is disputed.
- On True and Perfect Joy (De vera et perfecta laetitia): account in which Francis explains to Brother Leo that perfect joy consists in enduring rejection for the love of Christ. It is transmitted in later sources.
- Office of the Passion (Officium passionis Domini): series of psalms and antiphons for the hours of the day, centered on the Passion of Christ.

== Character and legacy ==
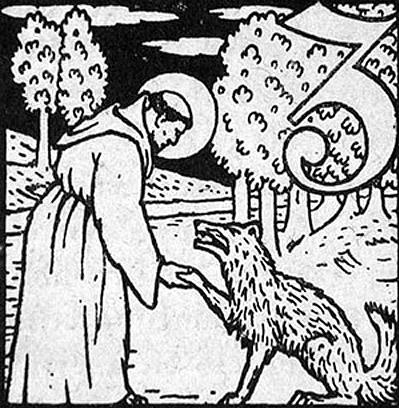
St. Francis talking to the wolf of Gubbio (Carl Weidemeyer, 1911)

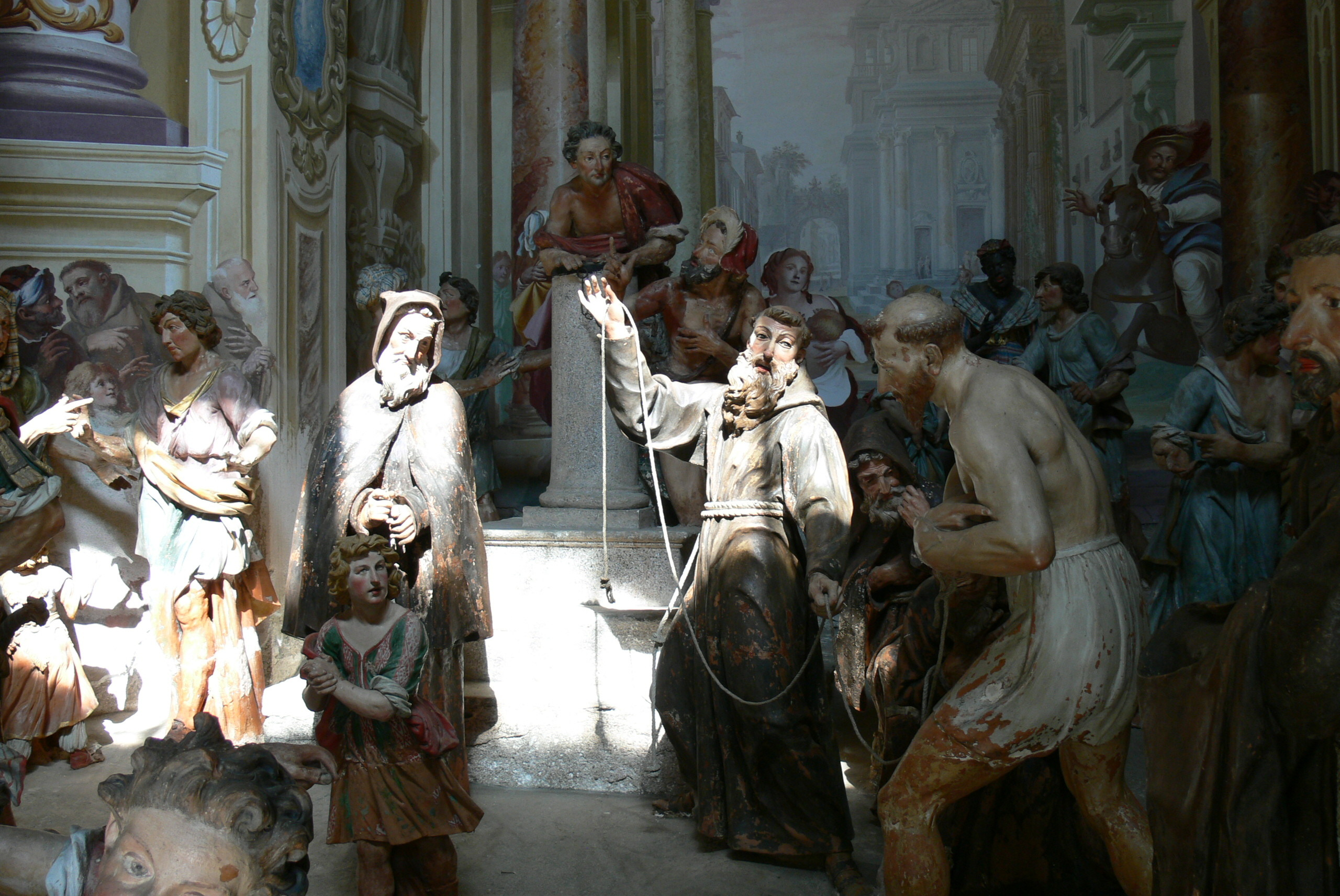
Francis led semi-naked for humility.

=== Testament ===
Francis of Assisi dictated a spiritual document shortly before his death in the autumn of 1226. The text is a source for reconstructing his religious experience and Christian mission, serving as a foundational reference for the identity of the Order of Friars Minor. According to Francis, the Testament was not intended to be a new rule, but rather a "remembrance, admonition, and exhortation" designed to assist the friars in more faithfully observing the Rule of Saint Francis and living according to the Gospels. The Testament was composed during the final months of Francis's life, a period when he no longer held administrative authority within the Franciscan community. The document addresses both his contemporaries and future generations of friars, seeking to preserve the original spirit of the movement. It functions as a personal spiritual legacy rather than a juridical or normative text, intended to accompany the Rule as a permanent guide for the order.

Francis begins his Testament by attributing his conversion to the direct action of divine grace. He identifies his encounter with lepers as the decisive catalyst for his internal transformation, noting that what had previously seemed "bitter" was subsequently changed into "sweetness of soul and body." This experience led to his definitive renunciation of the world and the adoption of a life centered on Gospel values. The text emphasizes an absolute adherence to the Catholic Church and to priests who live according to the precepts of the Roman Church. Francis asserts his veneration for priests as his "lords", regardless of their poverty or moral failings, due to their unique sacramental office. Central to this devotion is his Eucharistic piety; he states that he cannot perceive the Son of God physically in this world except through his most holy Body and Blood. This belief forms the basis of his reverence for both the clergy and the written sacred words, which he insists must be preserved in dignified settings. Reflecting on the early days of the order, Francis describes the arrival of his first companions as a gift from God, noting that initially, no one had instructed him on how to structure their communal life. He maintains that the Most High revealed to him that he was to live "according to the form of the holy Gospel." Consequently, Franciscan life is characterized by radical poverty, itinerancy, manual labor, and the status of "strangers and pilgrims" in the world. In this framework, labor is viewed as a means of subsistence and witness rather than a source of profit. When the fruits of labor prove insufficient, the friars are to rely on alms—a practice Francis identifies as the "table of the Lord".

The Testament emphasizes the obedience owed to the Minister General and local guardians, alongside the strict observance of liturgical prayer as prescribed by the Rule. Francis expressed significant concern regarding potential liturgical or doctrinal deviations, establishing rigorous procedures for friars who failed to remain faithful to the Catholic faith. Those deemed "non-Catholic" were to be surrendered to the Order's authorities and subsequently to the Cardinal Protector; this measure effectively prohibited individual members of the community from exercising private judicial functions. Francis explicitly stated that the Testament did not constitute a new Rule, but was intended as a "remembrance, admonition, and encouragement" to facilitate a more faithful adherence to the Rule promised to the Lord. Furthermore, he prohibited the addition of glosses or interpretations to the text, mandating that the Testament be read alongside the Rule during all chapters of the fraternity.

The Testament holds partial normative value, even though Francis explicitly denied it possessed formal legislative character. Its authority is derived from its status as the founder's final spiritual legacy and his express mandate that the text should permanently accompany the Franciscan Rule. Historiography has often characterized this document as a "difficult legacy", defined by rigorous demands regarding absolute poverty, obedience, and strict adherence to Roman Catholic orthodoxy. The papal bull Quo elongati, promulgated in late 1230, officially clarified the non-binding nature of the Testament. It established that the only mandatory norms for the friars were those contained in the Regula bullata of 1223. This rule had succeeded the more extensive Regula non bullata (1221), which had failed to receive official approval due to its length and lack of legal formalization. The decisive influence of Ugolino of Ostia (the future Gregory IX) in drafting the Regula bullata underscores his role in the institutionalization of the Franciscan Order. Under his guidance, the movement transitioned from a small charismatic community into an organized institution legally bound to the Catholic Church through a Cardinal Protector. The granting of the Privilegium paupertatis to Clare in 1228—following Francis's canonization via the bull Mira circa nos—illustrates her defense of the original Franciscan ideal of poverty against the standardizing efforts of the Curia. By securing this privilege, Clare successfully preserved Francis's primitive vision during a critical phase of the Order's consolidation.

==== The "Little Testament" ====
The "Little Testament", also known as the "Testament of Siena", was dictated to Brother Benedict in the spring of 1226. At the time, Francis was in a state of physical decline, suffering from severe hemorrhaging and chronic pain. In this brief document, he imparted three fundamental exhortations to his friars: the practice of fraternal charity, the strict observance of apostolic poverty, and unwavering fidelity to the prelates and clergy of the Catholic Church. Under these mandates, fraternal charity required the friars to regard one another as divine gifts, practicing charitable correction and mutual forgiveness. The observance of poverty dictated a complete detachment from material goods and a life of solidarity with the marginalized. Finally, his emphasis on obedience and "minority" (minoritas) underscored a commitment to ecclesiastical loyalty, even during periods of moral crisis within the institution, urging the friars to accept the clergy with humility rather than judgment. The Little Testament serves as a concise synthesis of the Franciscan charism and the saint's spiritual priorities in the final months of his life.

=== Francis' character ===
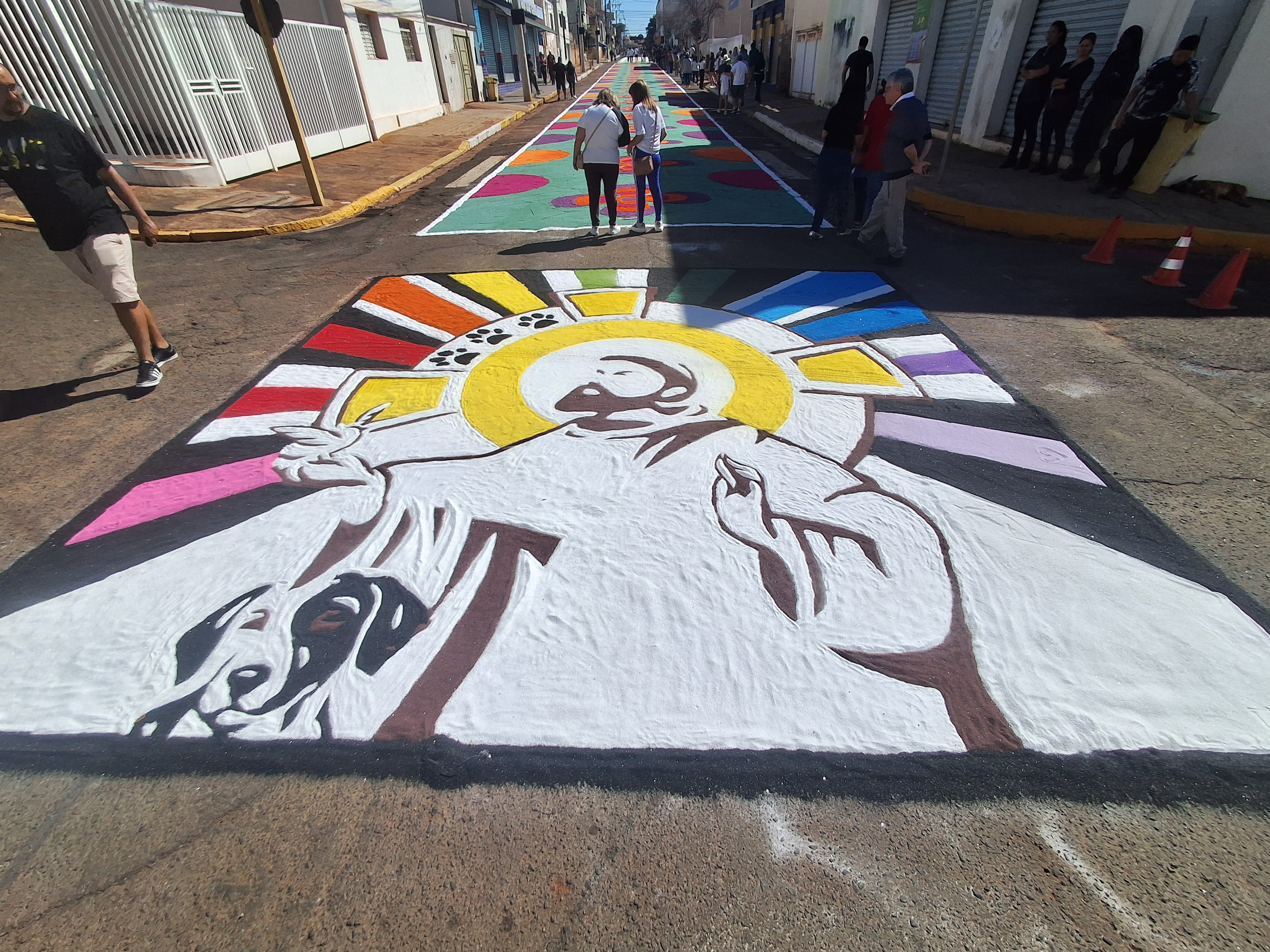
Corpus Christi carpet in São Manuel, São Paulo, Brazil, 2025

Francis set out to replicate Christ and literally to carry out his work. This is important in understanding Francis' character, his affinity for the Eucharist, and his respect for the priests who carried out the sacrament. Francis preached: "Your God is of your flesh, He lives in your nearest neighbour, in every man."

Francis and his followers celebrated and even venerated poverty, which was so central to his character that in his last written work, the Testament, Francis said that absolute personal and corporate poverty was the essential lifestyle for the members of his order. Pope Leo XIV identifies several dimensions in which Francis' life embodied a "self-emptying" approach: "from the palace to the leper, from eloquence to silence, from possession to total gift".

Francis believed that nature itself was the mirror of God. He called all creatures his "brothers" and "sisters"; he even preached to the birds, and supposedly persuaded a wolf in Gubbio to stop attacking some locals if they agreed to feed the wolf. Francis' deep sense of brotherhood under God embraced others and he declared that "he considered himself no friend of Christ if he did not cherish those for whom Christ died".

Francis's visit to Egypt and attempted rapprochement with the Muslim world had far-reaching consequences, long past his own death, since after the fall of the Crusader Kingdom, it would be the Franciscans, of all Catholics, who would be allowed to stay on in the Holy Land and be recognized as "Custodians of the Holy Land" on behalf of the Catholic Church.

At Greccio near Assisi, around 1220, Francis celebrated Christmas by setting up the first known presepio or crèche (Nativity scene). His nativity imagery reflected the scene in traditional paintings. Francis used real animals to create a living scene so that the worshipers could contemplate the birth of the child Jesus in a direct way, making use of the senses, especially sight. Both Thomas of Celano and Bonaventure, biographers of Francis, tell how he used only a straw-filled manger (feeding trough) set between a real ox and donkey. According to Thomas, it was beautiful in its simplicity, with the manger acting as the altar for the Christmas Mass.

=== Nature and the environment ===
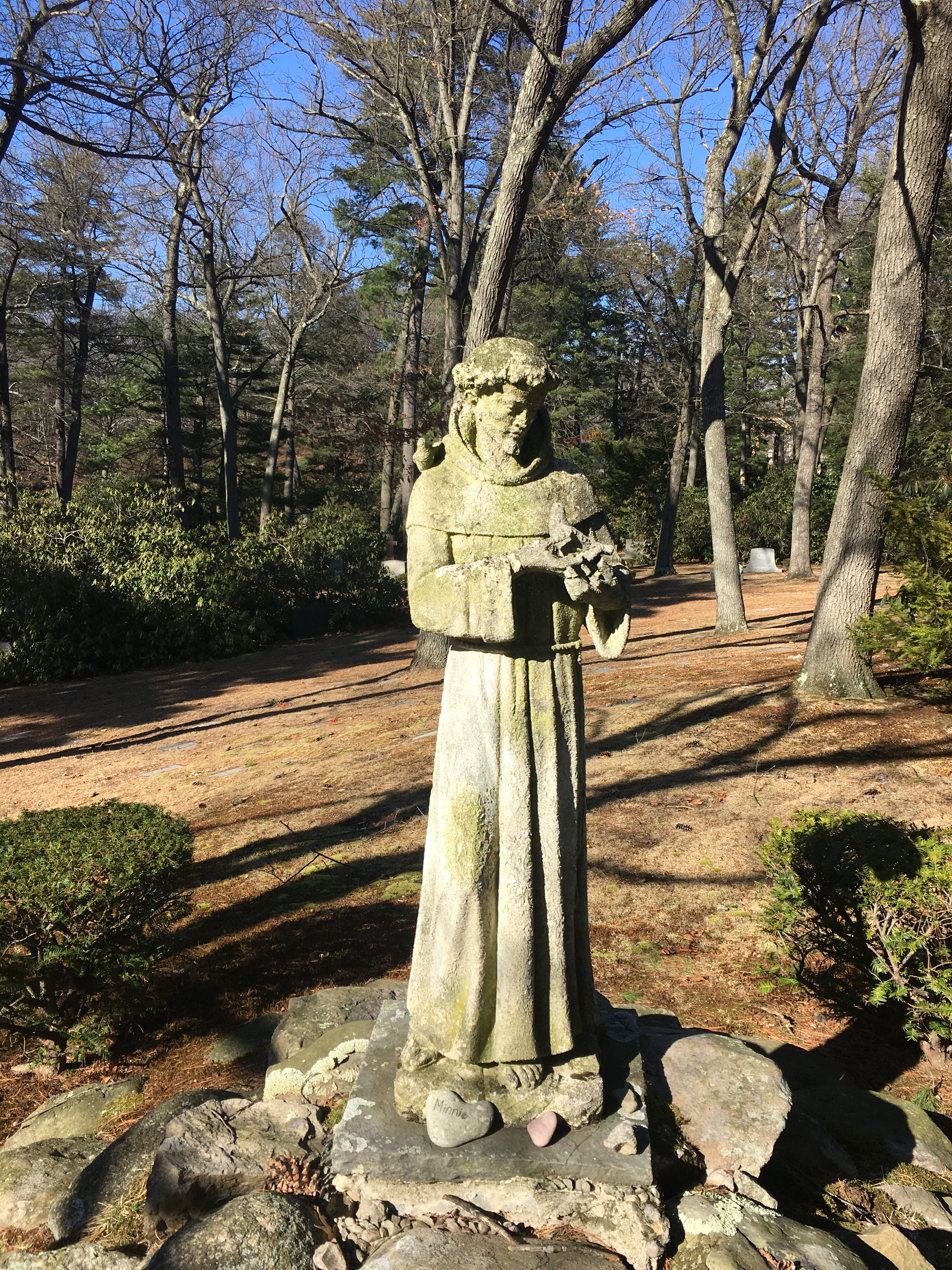
A garden statue of Francis of Assisi with birds

Francis preached the Christian doctrine that the world was created good and beautiful by God but suffers a need for redemption because of human sin. As someone who saw God reflected in nature, "St. Francis was a great lover of God's creation ..." In the Canticle of the Sun, he gives God thanks for Brother Sun, Sister Moon, Brother Wind, Water, Fire and Earth, all of which he sees as rendering praise to God.

Many of the stories that surround the life of Francis say that he had a great love for animals and the environment. The Fioretti ("Little Flowers") is a collection of legends and folklore that sprang up after Francis' death. One account describes how one day, while Francis was travelling with some companions, they happened upon a place in the road where birds filled the trees on either side. Francis told his companions to "wait for me while I go to preach to my sisters the birds." The birds surrounded him, intrigued by the power of his voice and not one of them flew away. He is often portrayed with a bird, typically in his hand.

Another legend from the Fioretti tells that in the city of Gubbio, where Francis lived for some time, was a wolf "terrifying and ferocious, who devoured men as well as animals". Francis went up into the hills and when he found the wolf, he made the sign of the cross and commanded the wolf to come to him and hurt nobody. Then Francis led the wolf into the town and surrounded by startled citizens made a pact between them and the wolf. Because the wolf had "done evil out of hunger", the townsfolk were to feed the wolf regularly. In return, the wolf would no longer prey upon them or their flocks. In this manner, Gubbio was freed from the menace of the predator.

Some modern commentators and animal rights advocates have mistakenly portrayed Francis as a vegetarian. However, historical records indicate that he did consume meat, and his earliest biographers make no mention of Francis adhering to a meatless diet. Francis' favourite dish was shrimp pie.

On 29 November 1979, Pope John Paul II declared Francis the patron saint of ecology. On 28 March 1982, John Paul II said that Francis' love and care for creation was a challenge for contemporary Catholics and a reminder "not to behave like dissident predators where nature is concerned, but to assume responsibility for it, taking all care so that everything stays healthy and integrated, so as to offer a welcoming and friendly environment even to those who succeed us." The same Pope wrote on the occasion of the World Day of Peace, 1 January 1990, that Francis "invited all of creation – animals, plants, natural forces, even Brother Sun and Sister Moon – to give honour and praise to the Lord. The poor man of Assisi gives us striking witness that when we are at peace with God we are better able to devote ourselves to building up that peace with all creation which is inseparable from peace among all peoples."

In 2015, Pope Francis published his encyclical letter Laudato si', about the ecological crisis and "care for our common home", which takes its name from the Canticle of the Sun, which Francis of Assisi composed. It presents Francis as "the example par excellence of care for the vulnerable and of an integral ecology lived out joyfully and authentically". This inspired the birth of the Laudato Si' Movement, a global network of nearly 1000 organizations promoting the Laudato si' message and the Franciscan approach to ecology.

=== Feast day ===
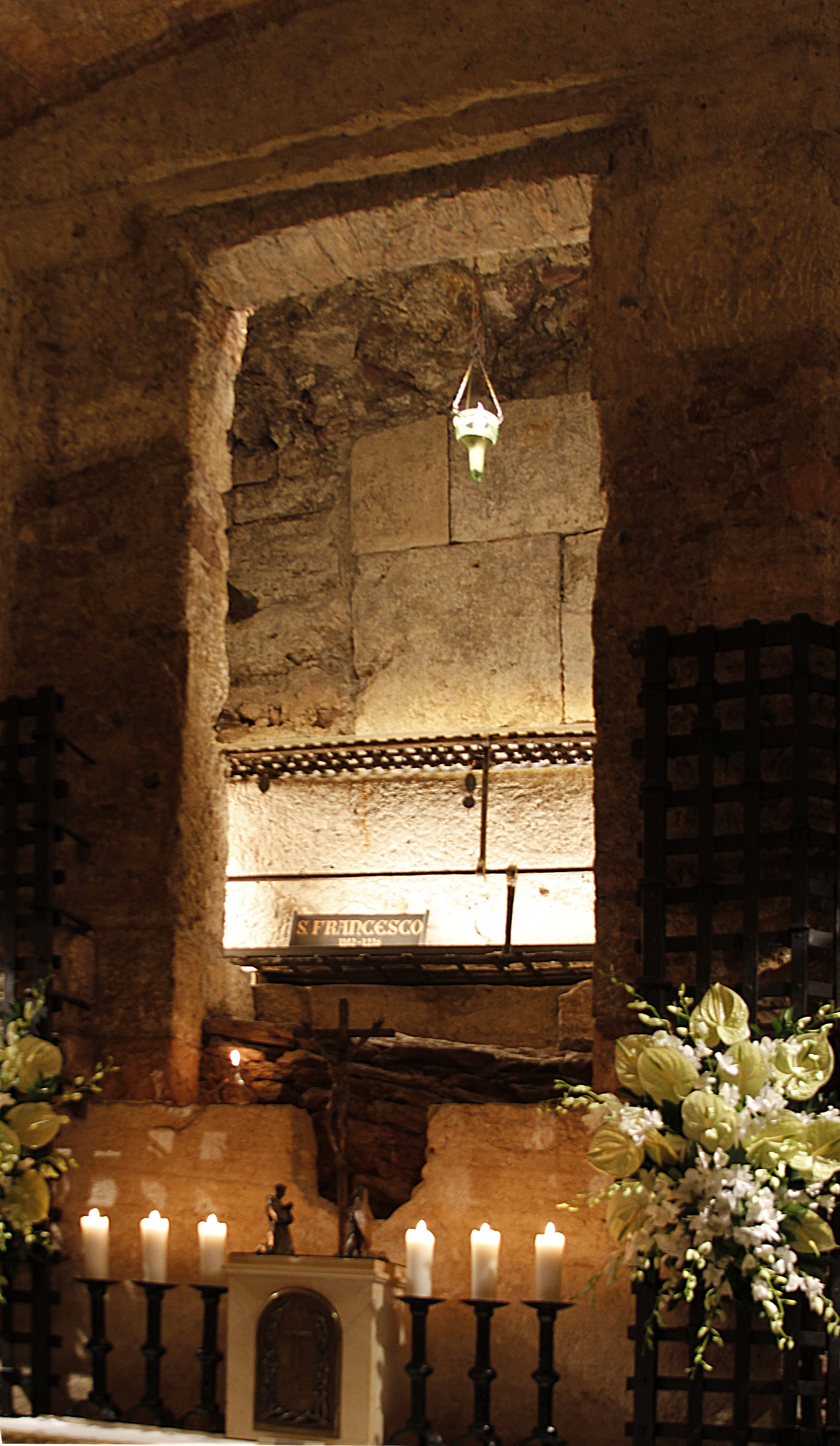
Francis' last resting place at Assisi

Francis' feast day is observed on 4 October. A secondary feast in honor of the stigmata received by Francis, celebrated on 17 September, was inserted in the General Roman Calendar in 1585 (later than the Tridentine calendar) and suppressed in 1604, but was restored in 1615. In the New Roman Missal of 1969, it was removed again from the General Calendar, as something of a duplication of the main feast on 4 October and left to the calendars of certain localities and of the Franciscan Order. Wherever the Tridentine Missal is used, however, the feast of the Stigmata remains in the General Calendar.

Francis is honoured in the Catholic Church, the Evangelical Lutheran Churches, the Anglican Communion (with a Lesser Festival in the Church of England, the Anglican Church of Canada, and the Episcopal Church USA) and the Old Catholic Churches, among other churches and religious communities on 4 October.

The Feast Day of Francis of Assisi marks the conclusion of the season of Creationtide in various Christian Churches that begins on the Feast of Creation (1 September). It is a popular practice on Francis' feast day for people to bring their pets and other animals to church for a blessing.

=== Papal name ===
On 13 March 2013, upon his election as Pope, Archbishop and Cardinal Jorge Mario Bergoglio of Argentina chose "Francis" as his papal name in honour of Francis of Assisi, becoming Pope Francis.

At his first audience on 16 March 2013, Pope Francis told journalists that he had chosen the name in honour of Francis of Assisi because of his concern for the poor. He recounted that Cardinal Cláudio Hummes had told him, "Don't forget the poor", right after the election; that made Bergoglio think of Francis. It was the first time a pope had taken the name. (Note: On the day of his election, the Vatican clarified that his official papal name was "Francis", not "Francis I". A Vatican spokesman said that the name would become Francis I if and when there is a Francis II.)

=== Patronage ===
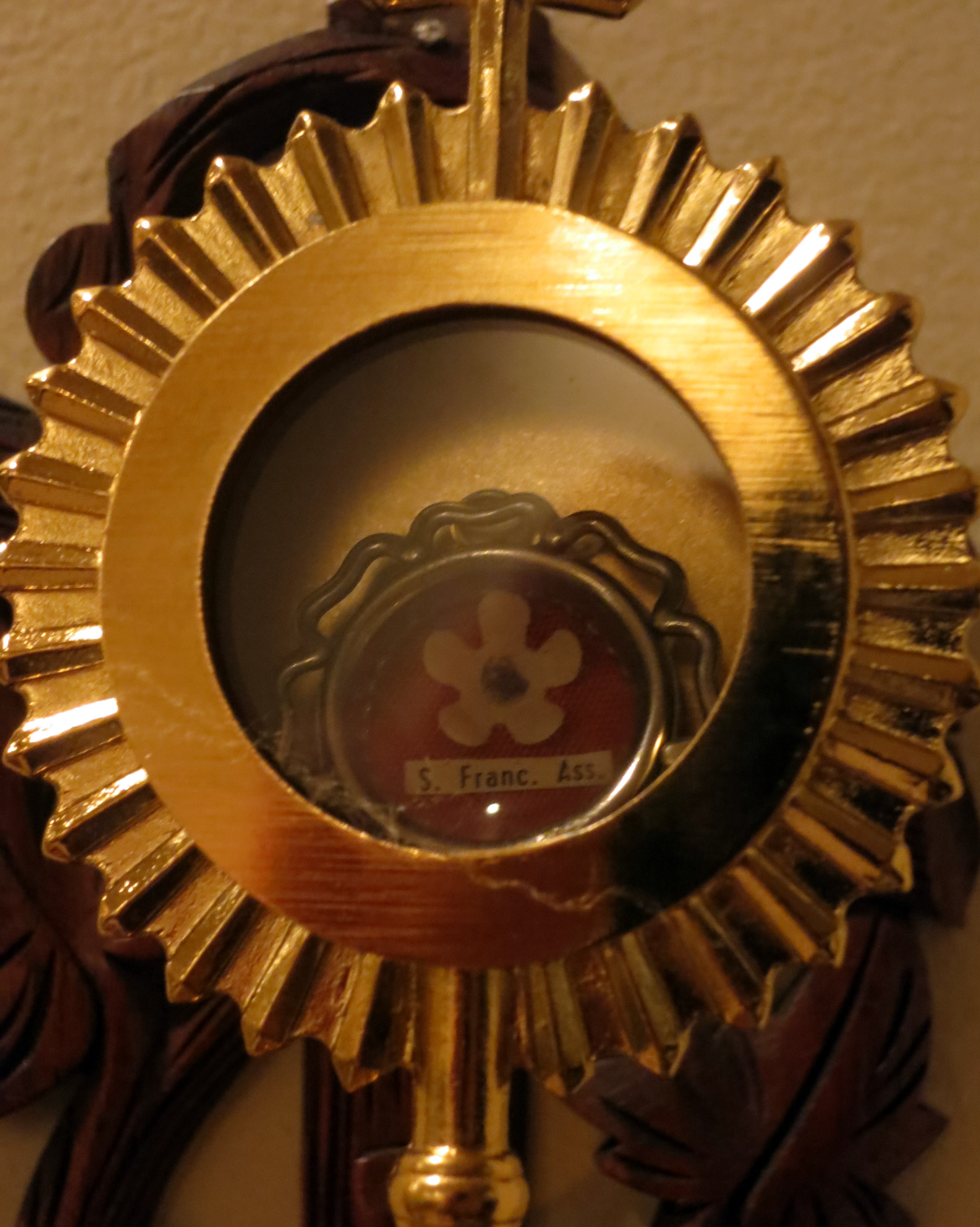
A relic of Francis of Assisi

On 18 June 1939, Pope Pius XII named Francis a joint patron saint of Italy along with Catherine of Siena with the apostolic letter "Licet Commissa". Pope Pius also mentioned the two saints in the laudative discourse he pronounced on 5 May 1949, in the Church of Santa Maria sopra Minerva.

Francis is the patron of animals and ecology. As such, he is the patron saint of the Laudato Si' Movement, a network that promotes the Franciscan ecological paradigm as outlined in the encyclical Laudato Si'.

He is also considered the patron against dying alone; against fire; patron of the Franciscan Order and Catholic Action; of families, peace and needleworkers, and a number of religious congregations.

He is the patron of many churches and other locations around the world, including: Italy; San Pawl il-Baħar, Malta; Freising, Germany; Lancaster, Lancashire; Kottapuram, India; Buhi, Camarines Sur, Philippines; General Trias, Philippines; San Francisco; Santa Fe, New Mexico; Colorado; Salina, Kansas; Metuchen, New Jersey; and Quibdó, Colombia.

On 1 October 2025, the Italian Parliament passed a law that confirms 4 October as national feast.

=== Pilgrimage routes and the Year of St. Francis (2026) ===
Numerous pilgrimage routes lead to the tomb of Francis in Assisi, including Via di Francesco (St. Francis' Way), Cammino Francescano della Marca (Franciscan Way of the Marches), and Cammino di Assisi (Assisi Way). In Umbria, St. Francis' Way leads to Assisi from Florence or Rome. The routes are created through cooperation between local authorities and the Franciscans and usually begin in places associated with his life, such as Gubbio. The network of St. Francis' Ways (known also as Francesco's Ways) has been developed since the 1990s, mostly in Italy, to encourage people to follow his footsteps and visit churches, monasteries, universities, and other facilities founded by the Franciscans.

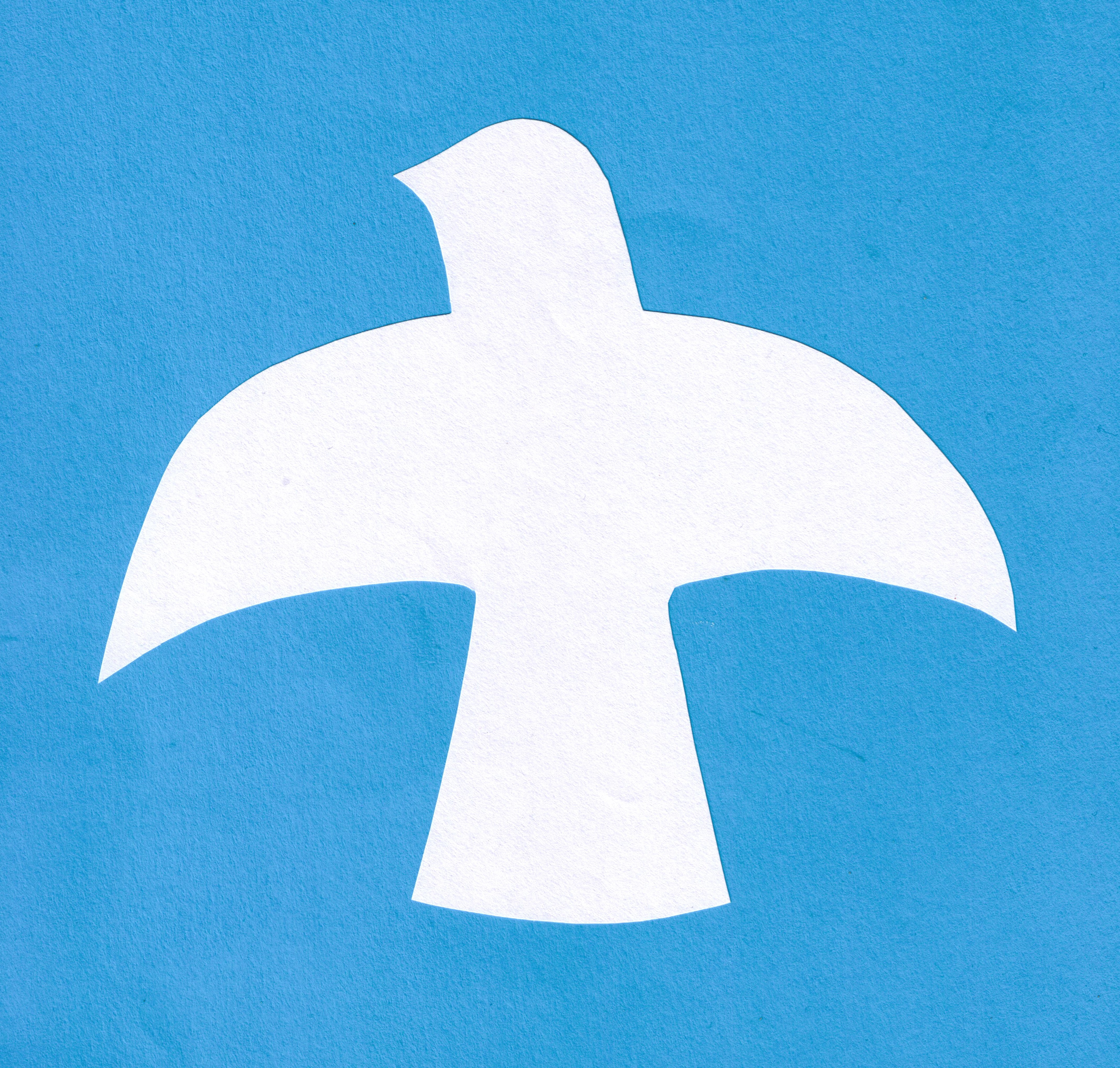
Logo used since 2026 for local Ways of St. Francis in Poland

In 2025, to commemorate the 800th anniversary of the Canticle of the Sun and 10th anniversary of Laudato si', the first local Way of St. Francis was created in Poland, in the Old Town of Poznań: the Poznań Way of St. Francis. It connects two Franciscan churches: at Bernardyński Square and Franciszkańska Street. He is the patron saint of peace-makers, so the route's description suggests spiritual tasks based on the Way of Peace in Rogalin near Poznań (one of Rogalin Ways), which are available in Polish, English, Russian, and Ukrainian. The tasks include prayer to the Holy Spirit, contemplation of nature, care for other people and wildlife, and promote a simpler, healthier lifestyle.

The first environmental pilgrimage on this new Polish trail took place on 18 January 2026, so it initiated the celebration of the Year of St. Francis, proclaimed by Pope Leo XIV a week earlier to commemorate the 800th anniversary of Francis' death. Since spring, other local Ways of St. Francis have been created to encourage a change in the way we look at everyday matters, nature, and our hearts. In June 2026, Laudato Si' Movement encouraged its leaders (Laudato Si' Animators) to promote ecological spirituality by means of creating similar local Ways of St. Francis in other locations.

=== Outside Catholicism ===
==== Anglicanism ====
One of the results of the Oxford Movement in the Anglican Church during the 19th century was the re-establishment of religious orders, including some of Franciscan inspiration. The principal Anglican communities in the Franciscan tradition are the Community of St. Francis (women, founded 1905), the Poor Clares of Reparation (PCR), the Society of St. Francis (men, founded 1934) and the Community of St. Clare (women, enclosed).

A U.S.-founded order within the Anglican world communion is the Seattle-founded order of Clares in Seattle (Diocese of Olympia), The Little Sisters of St. Clare.

The Anglican church retained the Catholic tradition of blessing animals on or near Francis' feast day of 4 October, and more recently Lutheran and other Protestant churches have adopted the practice.

==== Protestantism ====
Several Protestant groups have emerged since the 19th century that strive to adhere to the teachings of Francis.

There are also some small Franciscan communities within European Protestantism and the Old Catholic Church. There are some Franciscan orders in Lutheran Churches, including the Order of Lutheran Franciscans, the Evangelical Sisterhood of Mary and the Evangelische Kanaan Franziskus-Bruderschaft (Kanaan Franciscan Brothers).

==== Orthodox churches ====
Francis is not officially recognized as a saint by any Orthodox Church and the Orthodox Church has not pronounced any official view on the stigmata. The Orthodox saint, bishop and theologian Ignatius Brianchaninov referred to a particular hagiographer of Francis of Assisi as being in delusion:

"As an example of a book written in the state of delusion called opinion, we cite the following: 'When Francis was caught up to heaven,' says a writer of his life, 'God the Father, on seeing him, was for a moment in doubt to as [sic] to whom to give the preference, to His Son by nature, or to His son by grace-Francis.' What can be more frightful or madder than this blasphemy, what can be sadder than this delusion?".

Francis of Assisi received limited veneration by Orthodox Christians in the Middle Ages, and there are Orthodox icons of him at the Church of Panagia Kera at Kritsa, in Crete.

Francis' feast is celebrated at New Skete, an Eastern Orthodox monastic community in Cambridge, New York, United States, founded by Catholic Franciscans in the 20th century.

Joseph the Hesychast had Francis as his baptismal name, with the Greek tradition requiring a saint's name to be taken at baptism.

The Romanian Orthodox priest, iconographer and saint Arsenie Boca painted an icon of saints in Draganescu Church, which included Francis of Assisi.

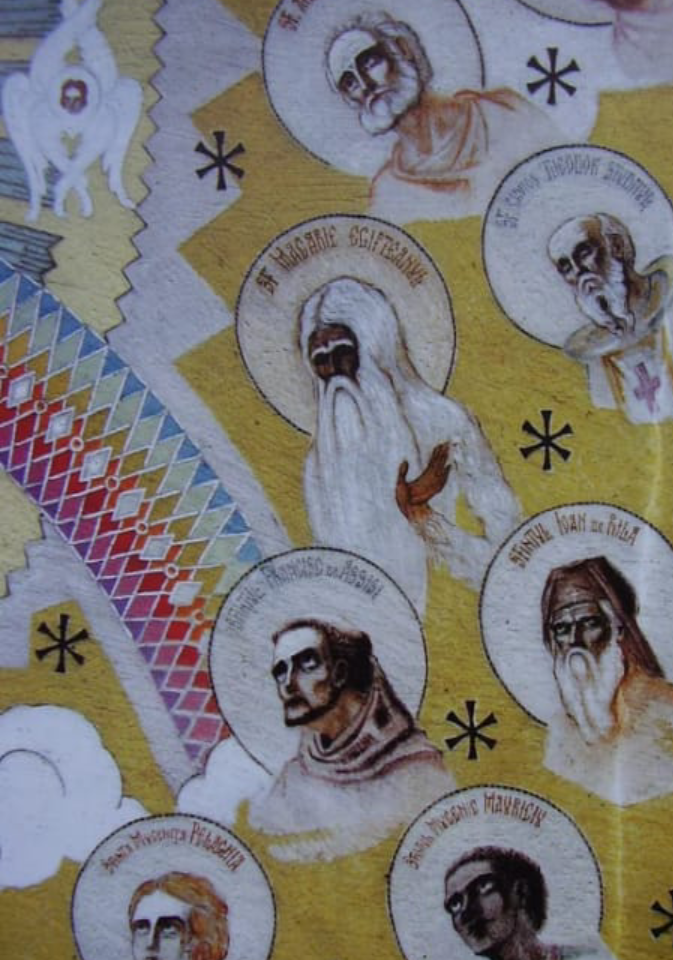
Icon of Saints, including Francis of Assisi, by Arsenie Boca, located in Draganescu Church

==== Other religions ====
Outside of Christianity, other individuals and movements are influenced by the example and teachings of Francis. These include the philosopher Eckhart Tolle, who has made videos on the spirituality of Francis.

The interreligious spiritual community of Skanda Vale in Wales also takes inspiration from the example of Francis and models itself as an interfaith Franciscan order.

=== Main writings ===
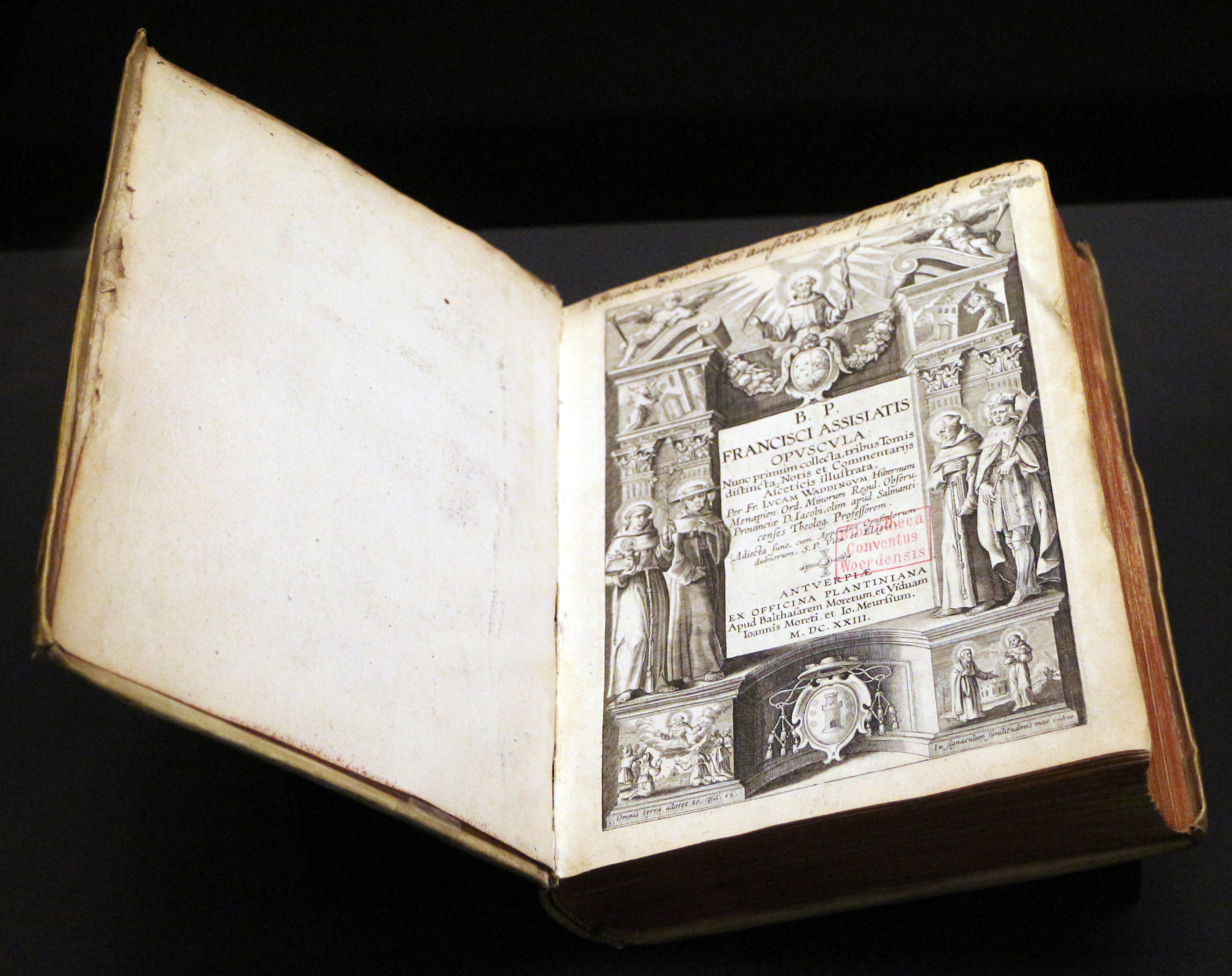
Francisci Assisiatis opuscula, Antverpiae, apud Balthasarem Moretum, 1623

- Canticum Fratris Solis or Laudes Creaturarum; Canticle of the Sun, 1224
- Oratio ante Crucifixum, Prayer before the Crucifix, 1205 (extant in the original Umbrian dialect as well as in a contemporary Latin translation)
- Regula non bullata, the Earlier Rule, 1221
- Regula bullata, the Later Rule, 1223
- Testament, 1226
- Admonitions, 1205 to 1209

For a complete list, see The Franciscan Experience.

Francis is considered the first Italian poet by some literary critics. He believed commoners should be able to pray to God in their own language and often wrote in Umbrian rather than Latin.

The anonymous 20th-century prayer "Make Me an Instrument of Your Peace" is widely attributed to Francis, but there is no evidence for it.

== In art ==
The Franciscan Order promoted devotion to the life of Francis from his canonization onwards, and Francis appeared in European art soon after his death. The order commissioned many works for Franciscan churches, either showing him with sacred figures or episodes from his life. There are large early fresco cycles in the Basilica of San Francesco d'Assisi, parts of which are shown above.

There are countless seventeenth- and eighteenth-century depictions of Saint Francis of Assisi and a musical angel in churches and museums throughout western Europe. The titles of these depictions vary widely, at times describing Francis as "consoled", "comforted", in "ecstasy" or in "rapture"; the presence of the musical angel may or may not be mentioned.

Francis of Assisi in art

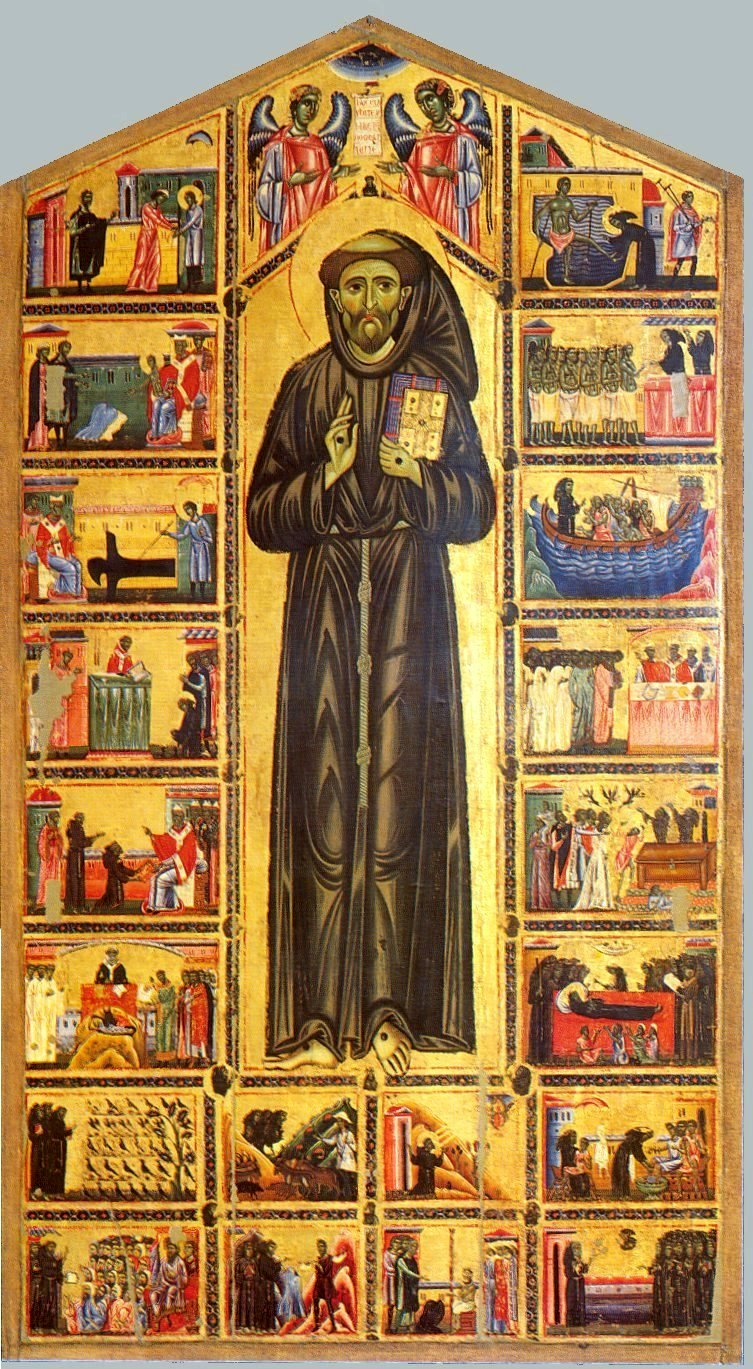
St. Francis and scenes from his life, 13th century, in Santa Croce, Florence

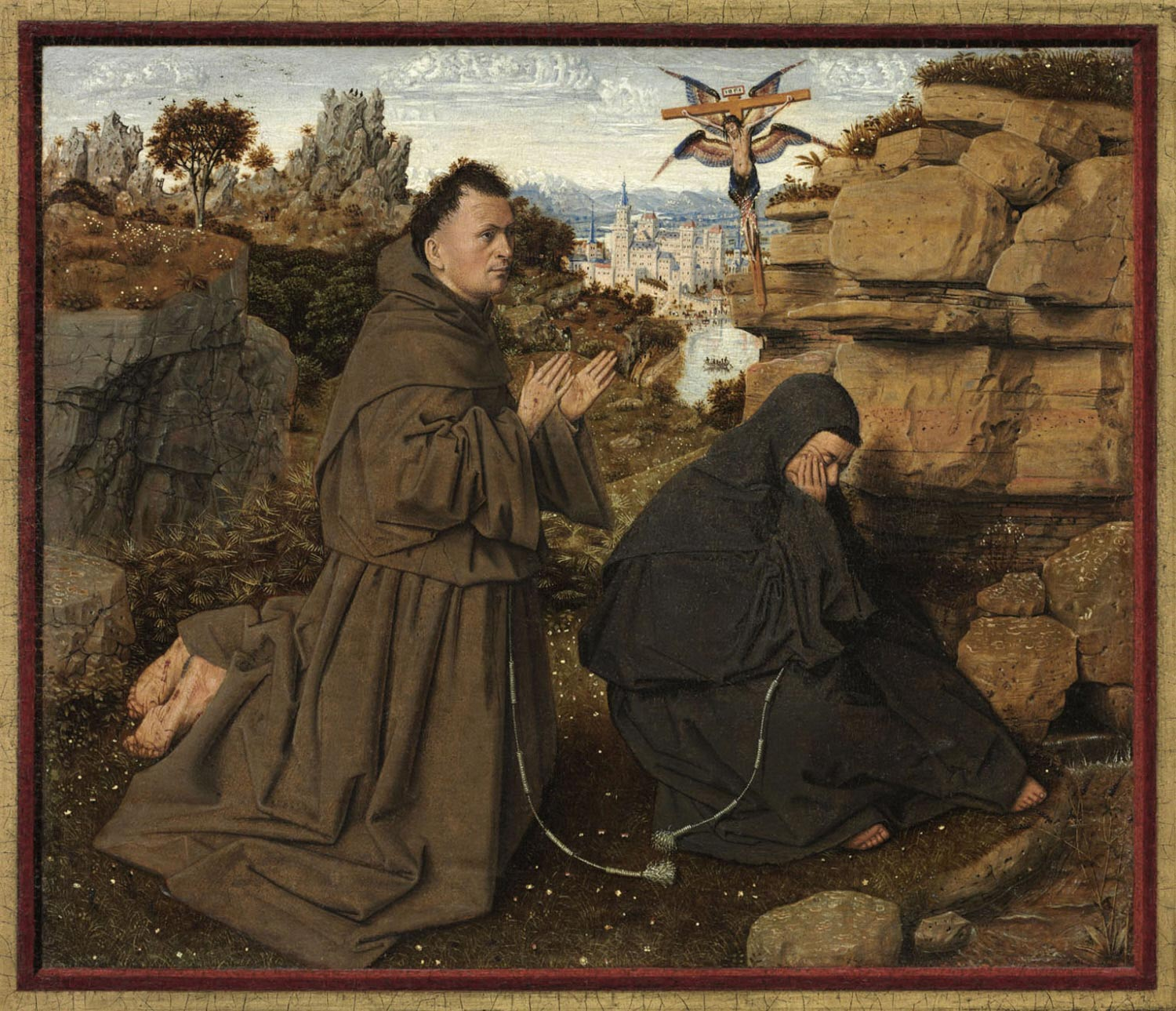
Saint Francis of Assisi Receiving the Stigmata, Jan van Eyck, c. 1430–1432, Turin version

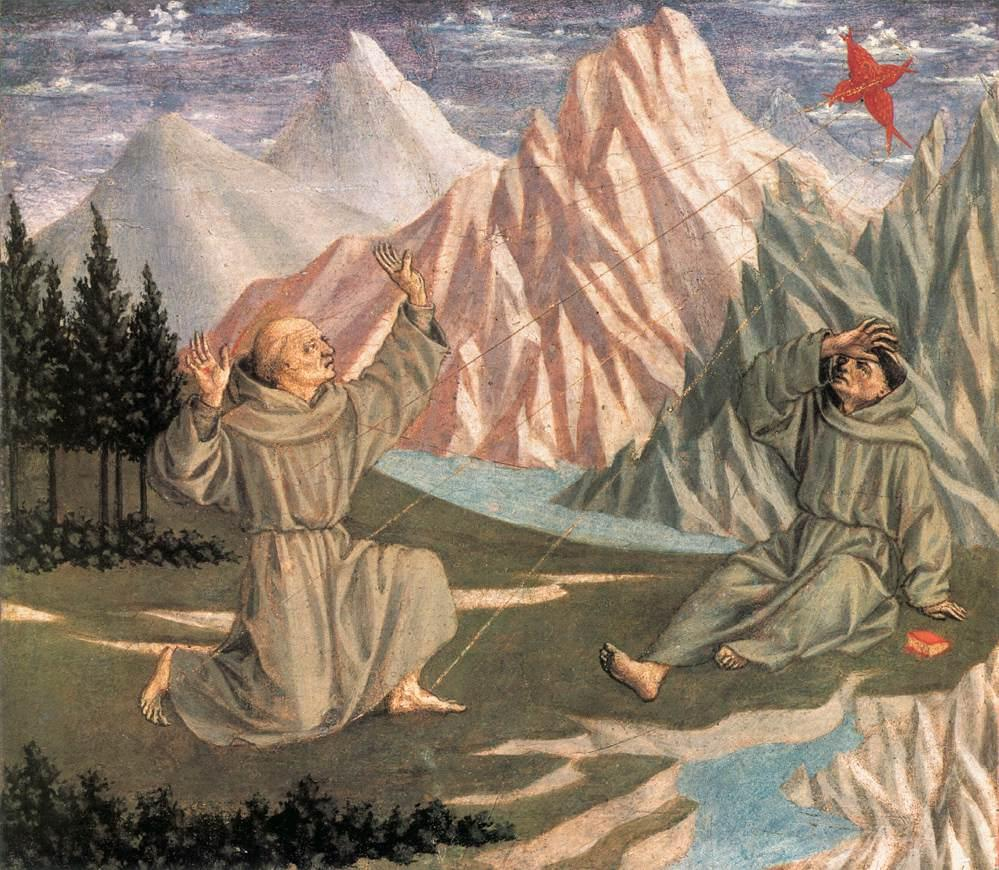
The Stigmatization of St Francis, Domenico Veneziano, 1445

Saint Francis in the Desert Giovanni Bellini, c. 1480

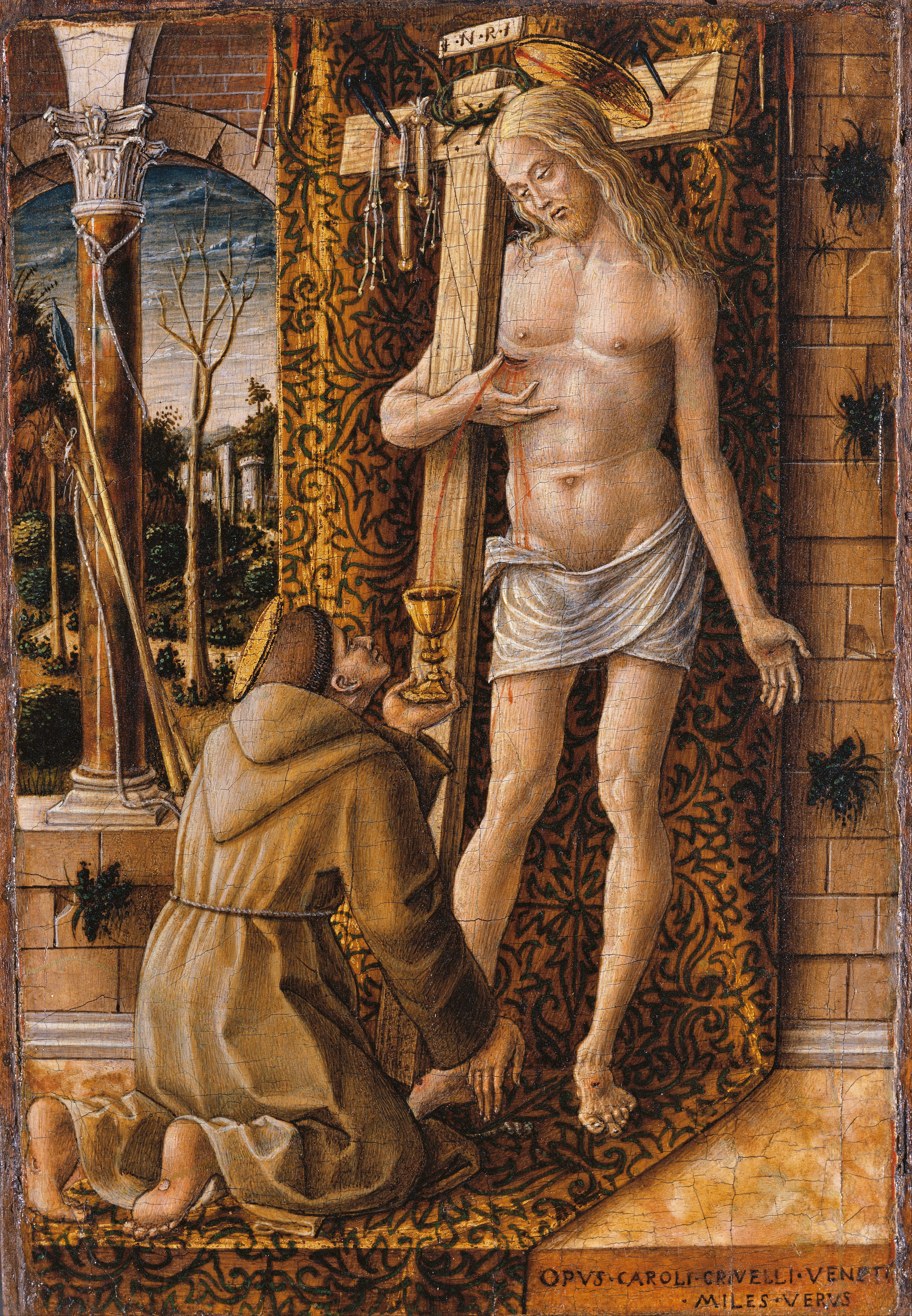
Saint Francis with the Blood of Christ, Carlo Crivelli, c. 1500

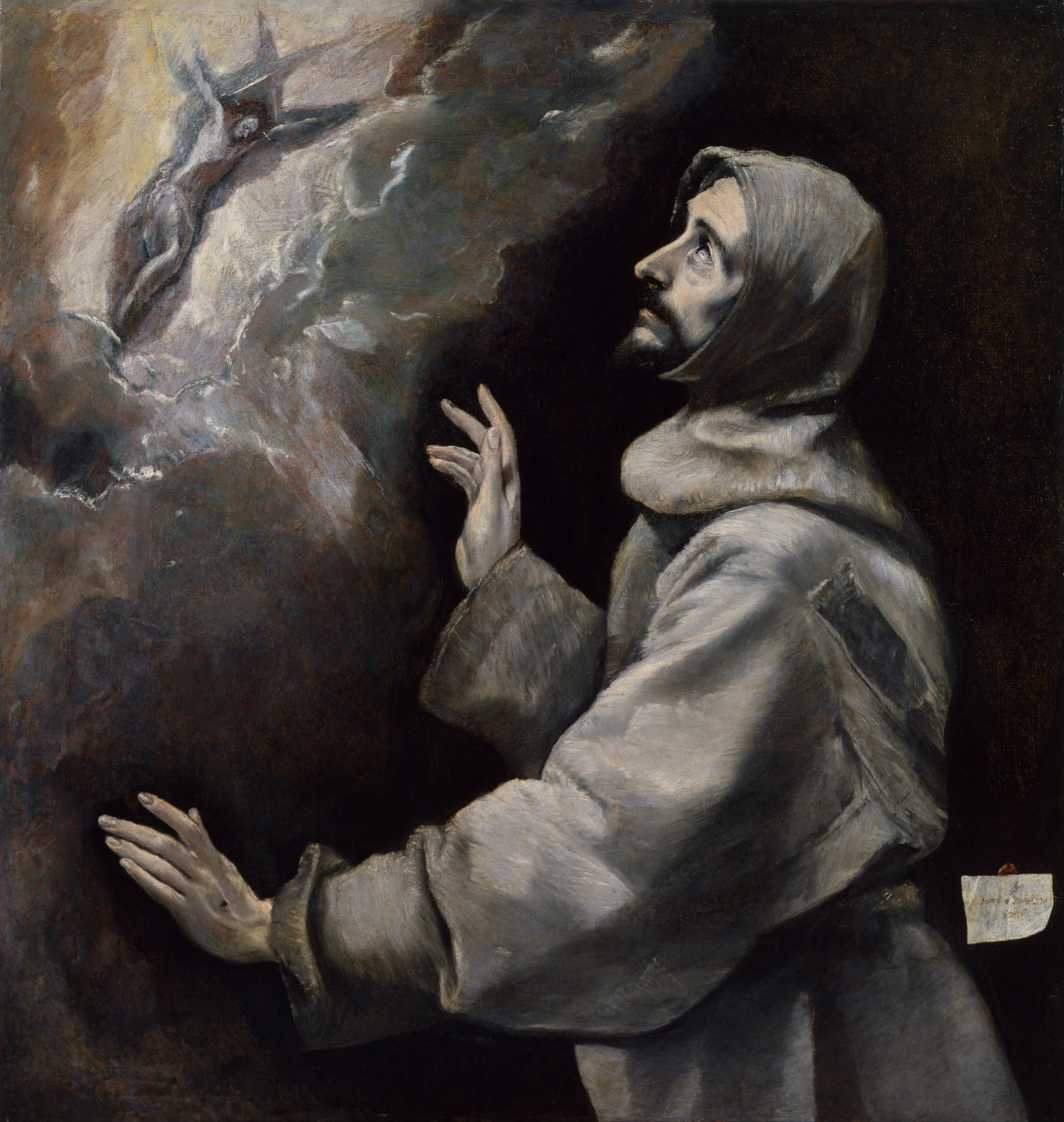
Saint Francis Receiving the Stigmata, Studio of El Greco, 1585–1590

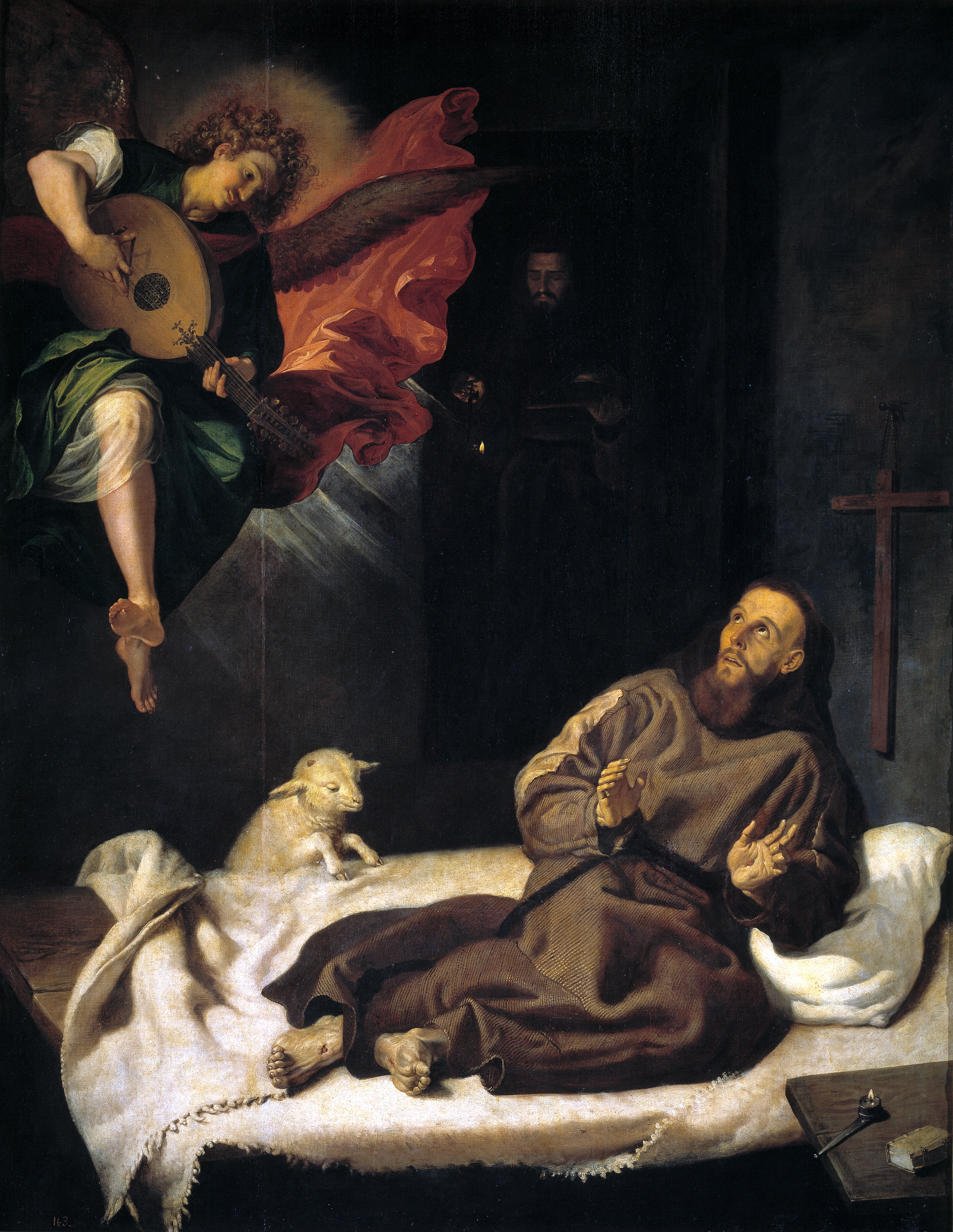
Francis of Assisi with angel music, Francisco Ribalta, c. 1620

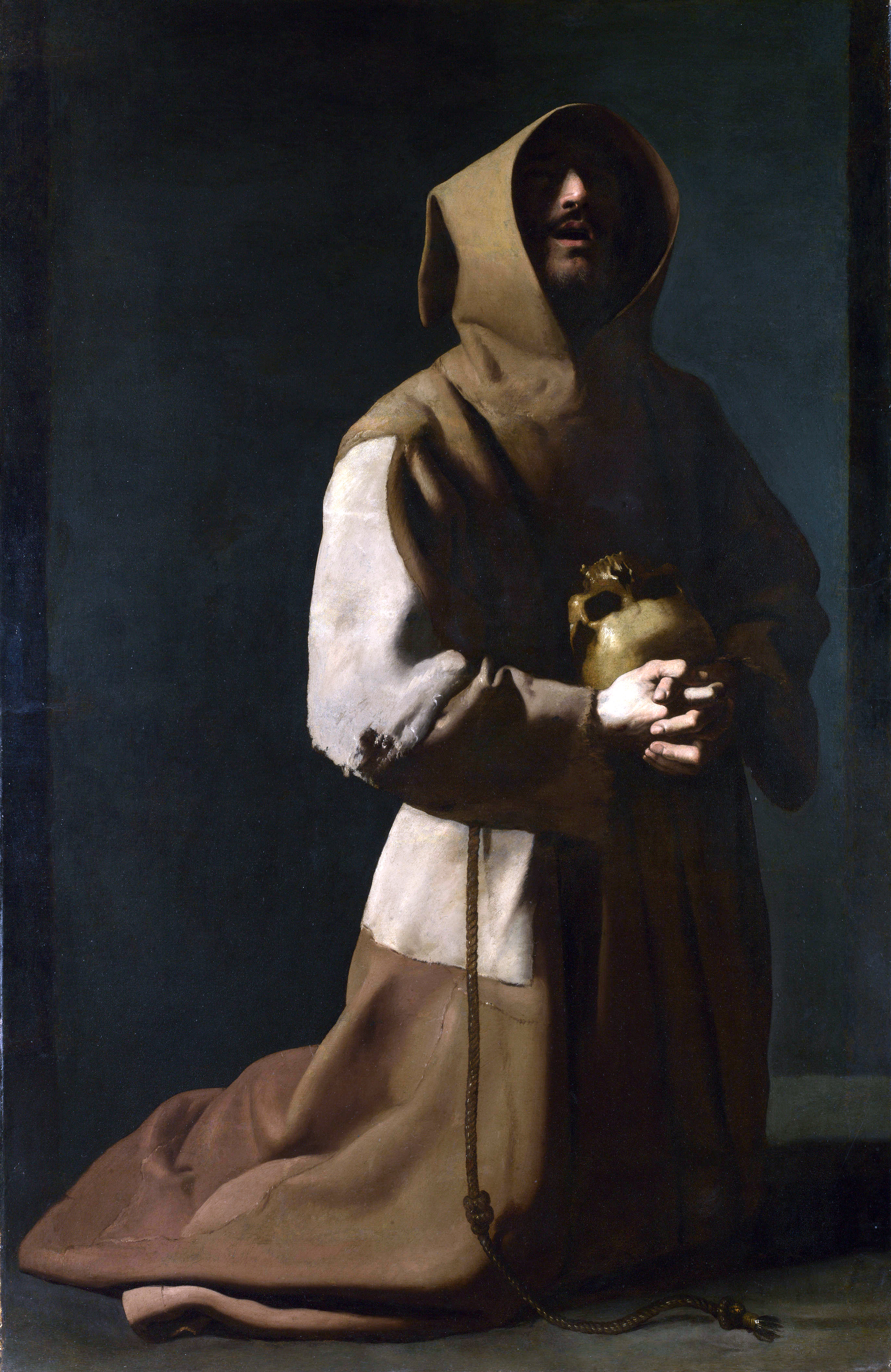
Saint Francis in Meditation, Francisco de Zurbarán, 1639

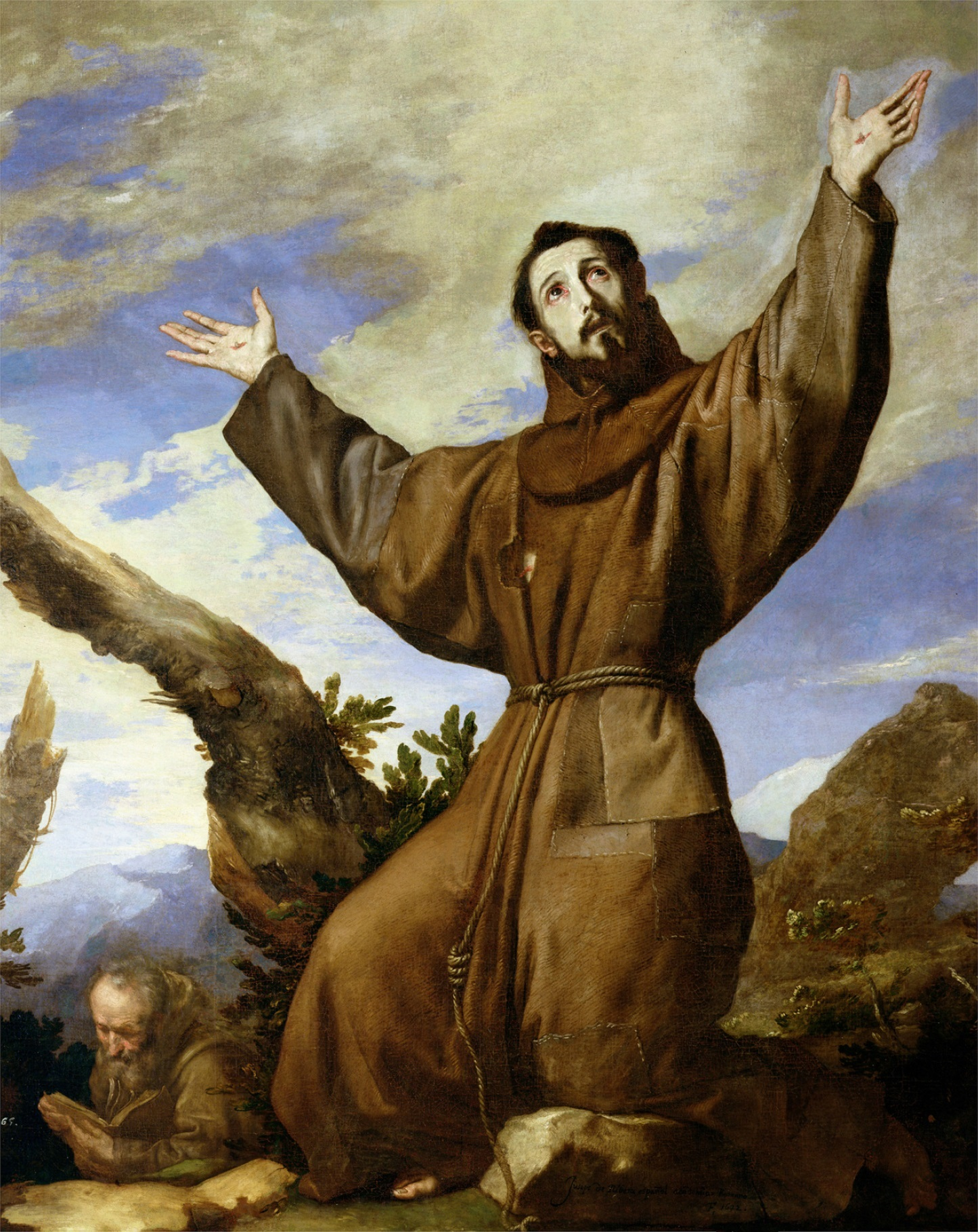
Saint Francis of Assisi in Ecstasy, Jusepe de Ribera, 1639

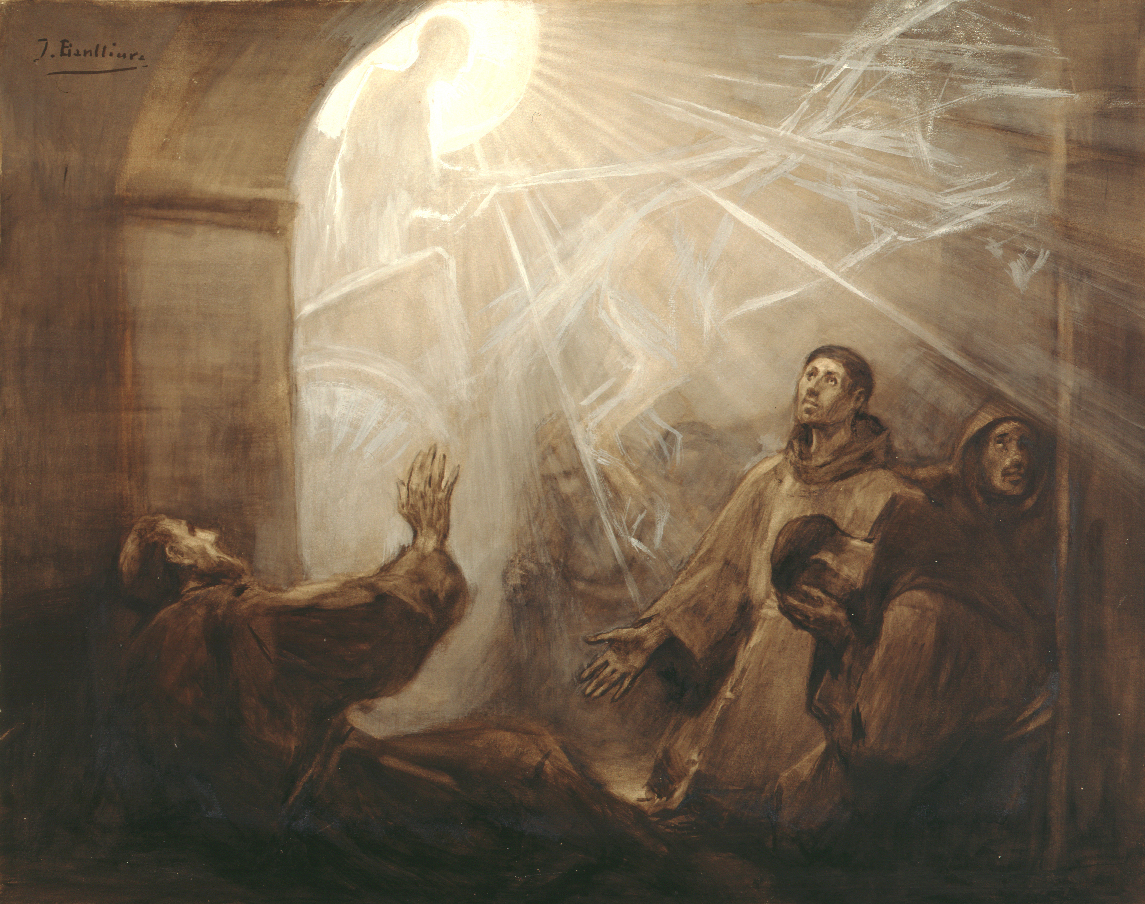
Francis of Assisi visiting his convent while far away, in a chariot of fire, José Benlliure y Gil (1855–1937)

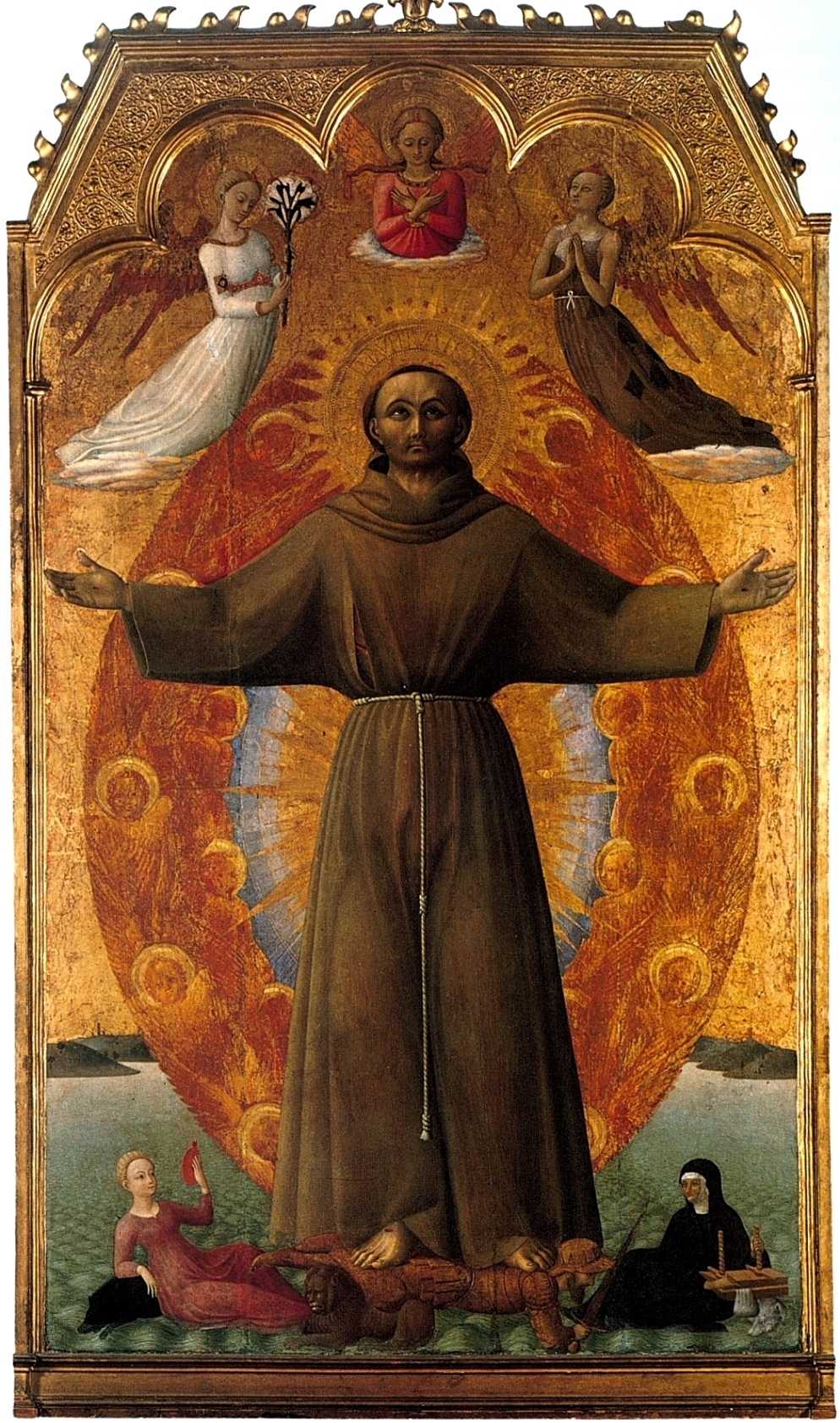
The Ecstasy of St. Francis, Stefano di Giovanni, 1444

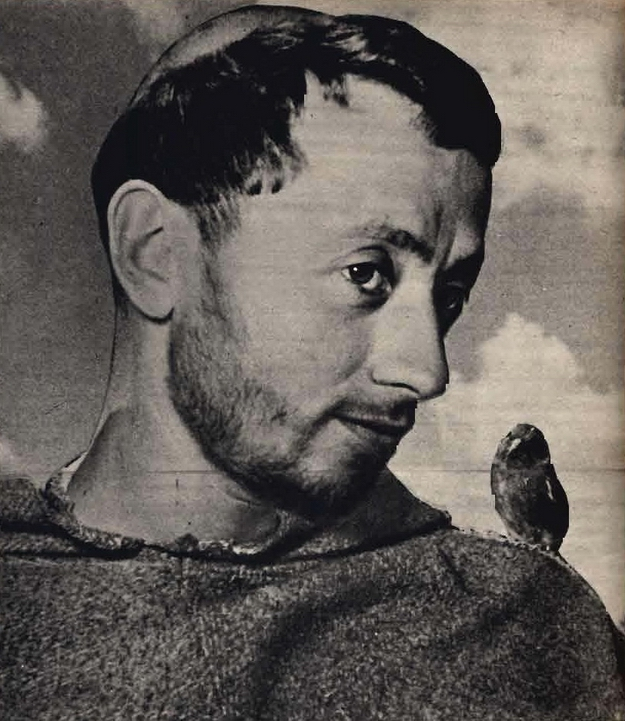
Nazario Gerardi as Francis in The Flowers of St. Francis, 1950

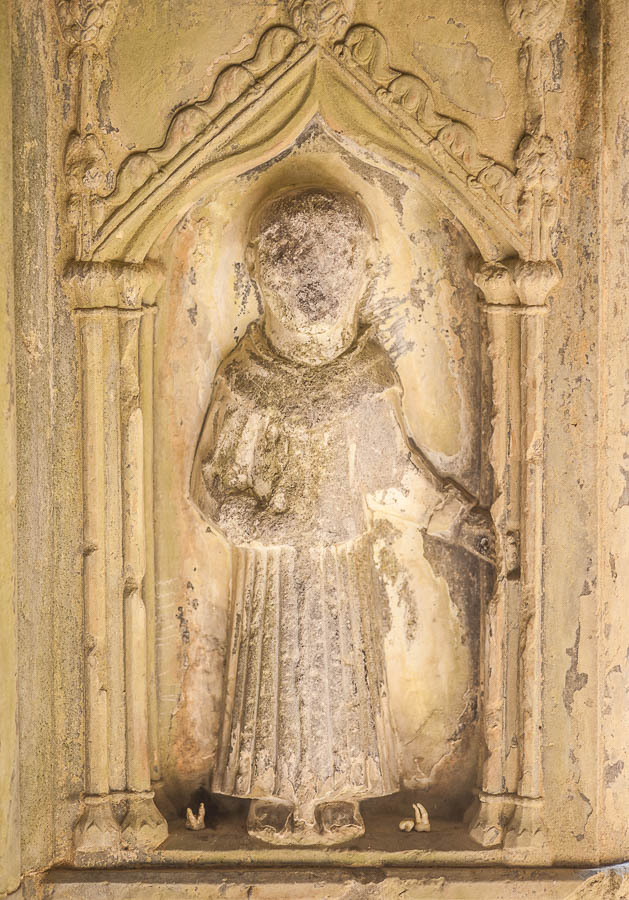
Statue in Askeaton Abbey, Ireland, claimed to cure toothache, 14th–15th century

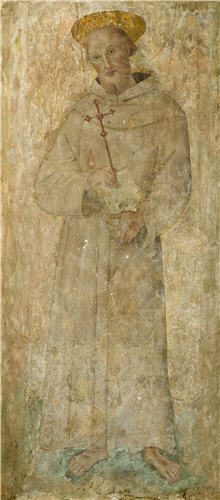
St Francis, Tiberio d'Assisi, 1470–1524

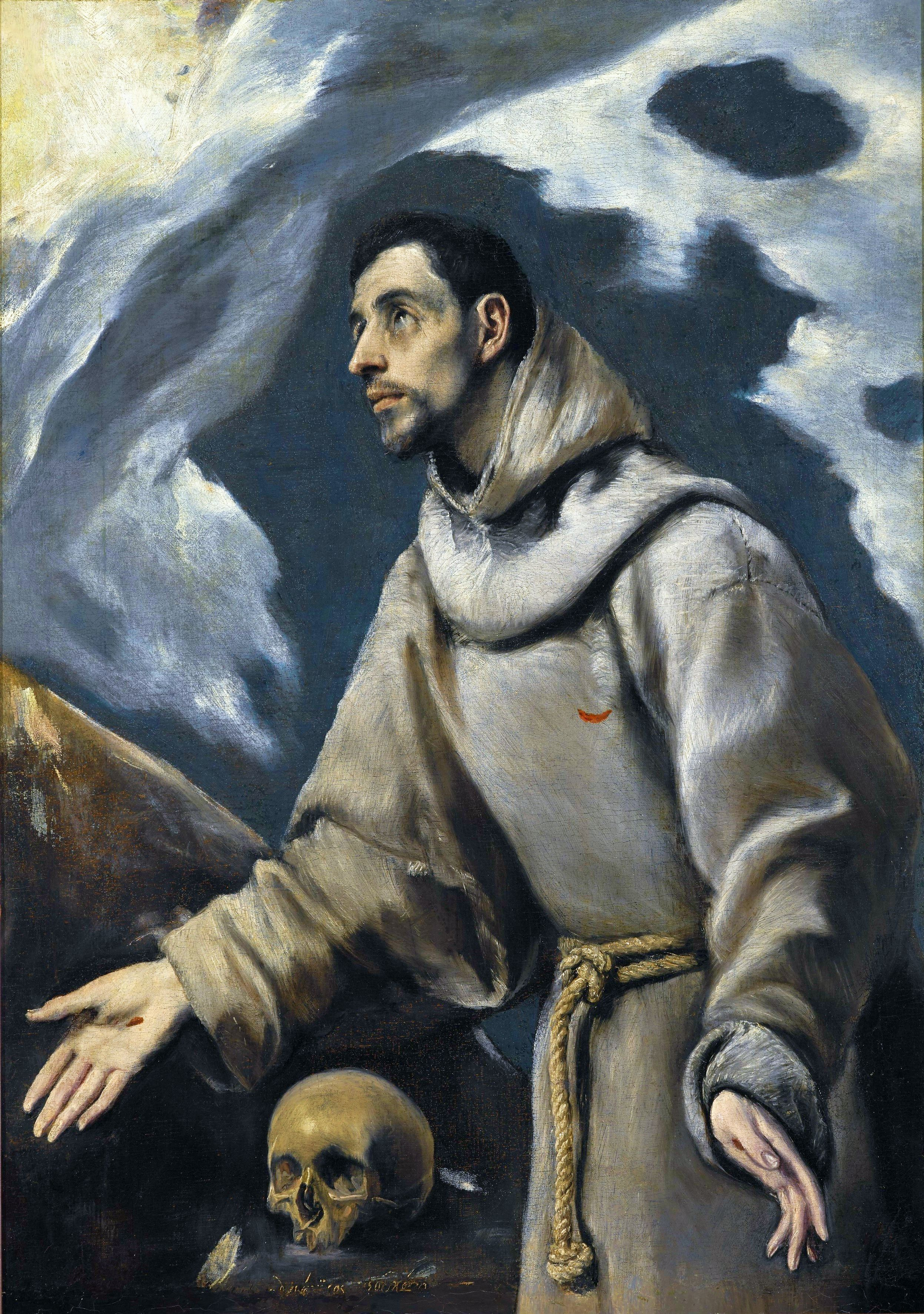
Ecstasy of St. Francis of Assisi, attributed to El Greco.

== Media ==
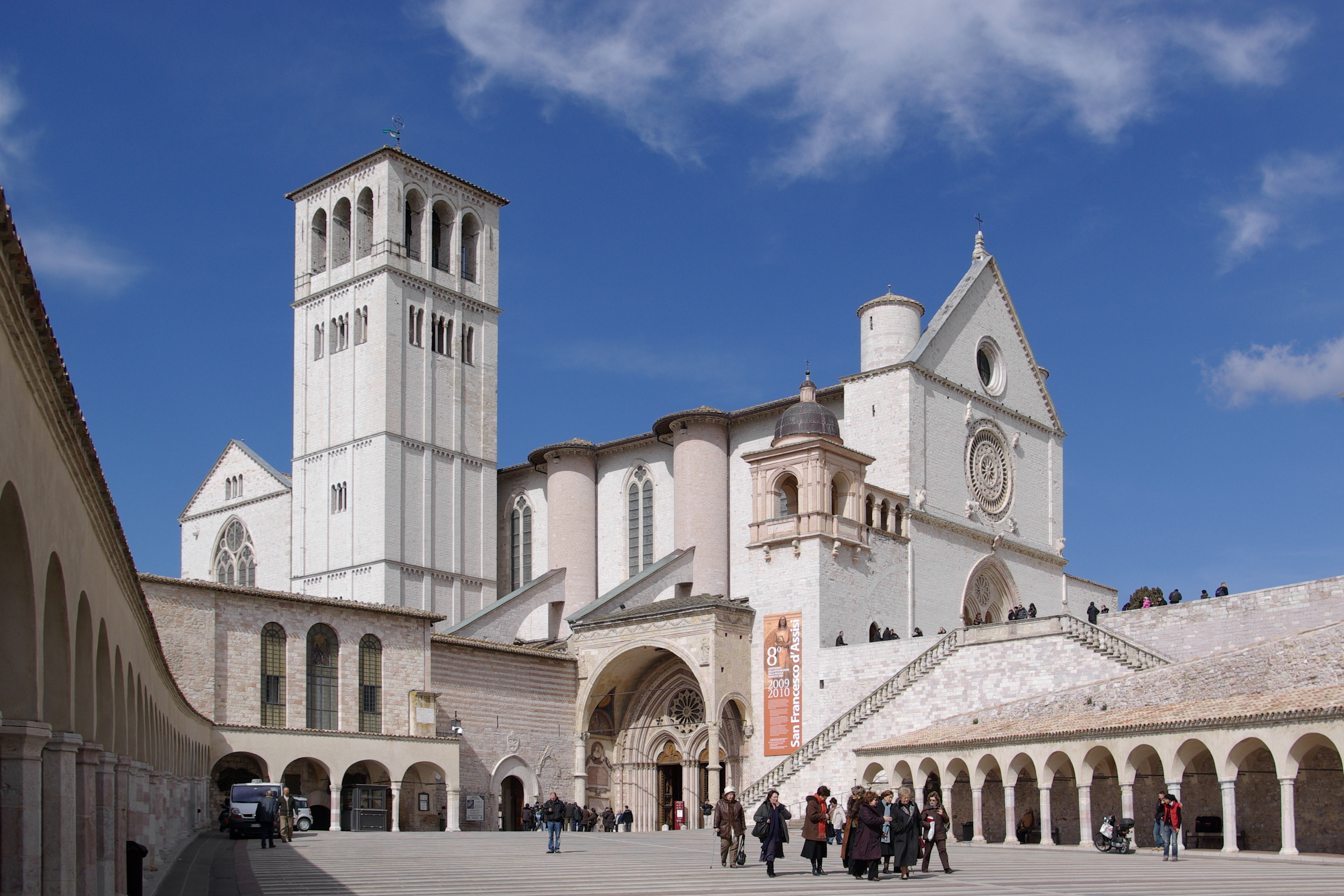
Basilica of St. Francis, Assisi

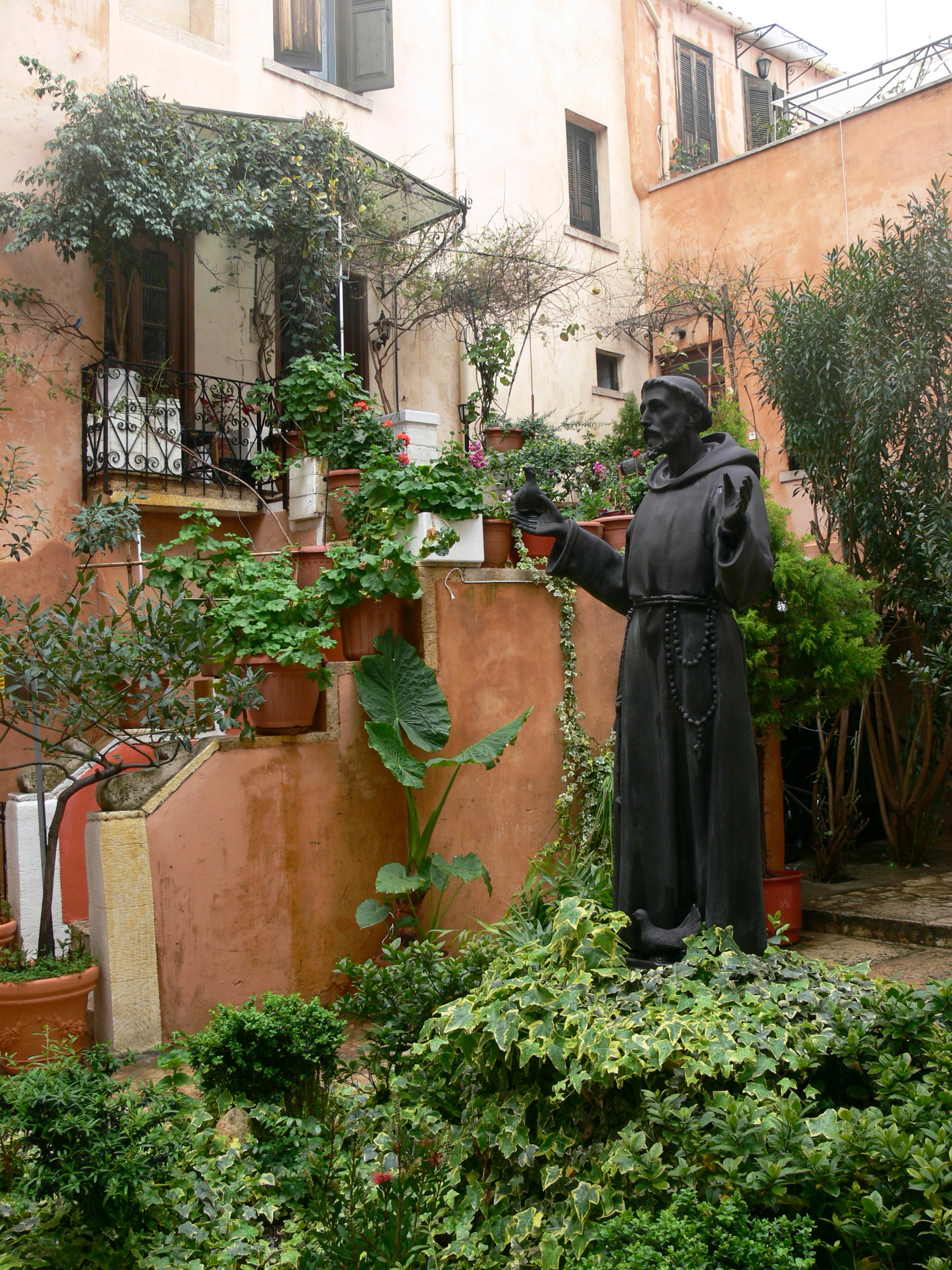
Statue of St. Francis in front of the Catholic church of Chania

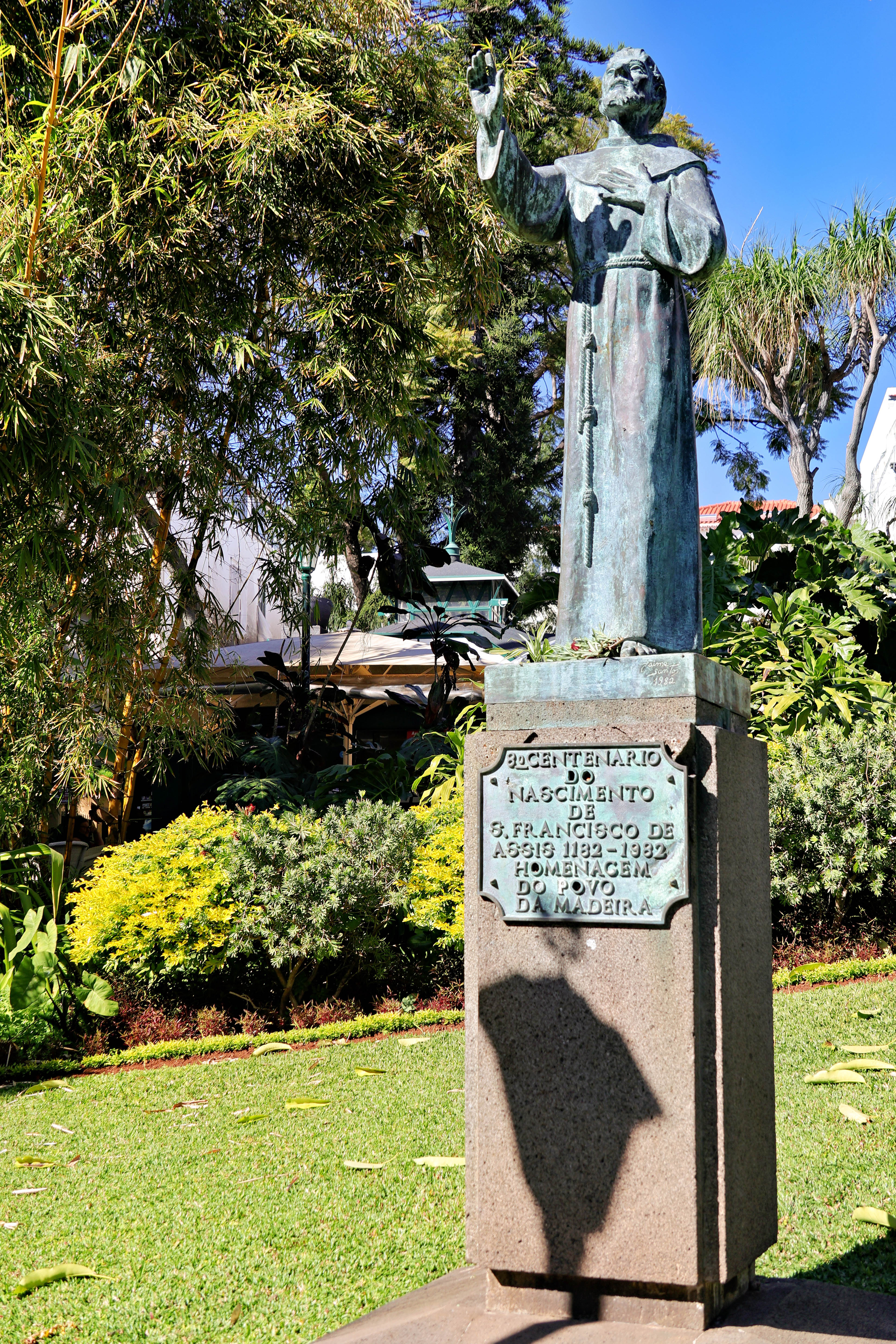
Statue by Jaime Santos in the Funchal Municipal Garden in Funchal

=== Films ===
- The Flowers of St. Francis, a 1950 film directed by Roberto Rossellini and co-written by Federico Fellini. Francis was played by Nazario Gerardi, a Franciscan friar from the monastery Nocera Inferiore.
- Francis of Assisi, a 1961 film directed by Michael Curtiz, based on the novel The Joyful Beggar by Louis de Wohl, starring Bradford Dillman as Francis. Dolores Hart, who plays Clare, later became a Benedictine nun.
- Francesco di Assisi, a 1966 made-for-television film directed by Liliana Cavani, starring Lou Castel as Francis.
- The Hawks and the Sparrows, a 1966 film directed by Pier Paolo Pasolini
- Brother Sun, Sister Moon, a 1972 film by Franco Zeffirelli, starring Graham Faulkner as Francis.
- Francesco, a 1989 film by Liliana Cavani, contemplatively paced, follows Francis of Assisi's evolution from a rich man's son to a religious humanitarian, and eventually to a full-fledged self-tortured saint. Francis is played by Mickey Rourke.
- St. Francis, a 2002 film directed by Michele Soavi, starring Raoul Bova as Francis.
- Clare and Francis, a 2007 film directed by Fabrizio Costa, starring Maria Palma Petruolo and Ettore Bassi
- Pranchiyettan and the Saint, a 2010 satirical Indian Malayalam film
- Finding St. Francis, a 2014 film directed by Paul Alexander
- L'ami – François d'Assise et ses frères (The friend – Francis of Assisi and his brothers), a 2016 film directed by Renaud Fely and Arnaud Louvet starring Elio Germano
- The Sultan and the Saint, a 2016 film directed by Alexander Kronemer, starring Alexander McPherson
- Sign of Contradiction, a 2018 documentary film featuring commentary by Dave Pivonka, Cardinal Raniero Cantalamessa and others, focusing on a revealing of the true Francis to modern audiences.
- In Search of St. Francis of Assisi, documentary featuring Franciscan friars and others
- The Letter: A Message for our Earth, a 2022 film on YouTube Originals by Nicolas Brown, telling the story of Saint Francis and the encyclical 'Laudato Si'.

=== Music ===
- Franz Liszt:
  - Cantico del sol di Francesco d'Assisi, S.4 (sacred choral work, 1862, 1880–81; versions of the Prelude for piano, S. 498c, 499, 499a; version of the Prelude for organ, S. 665, 760; version of the Hosannah for organ and bass trombone, S.677)
  - St. François d'Assise: La Prédication aux oiseaux, No. 1 of Deux Légendes, S.175 (piano, 1862–63)
- Gabriel Pierné: Saint François d'Assise (oratorio, 1912)
- William Henry Draper: All Creatures of Our God and King (hymn paraphrase of Canticle of the Sun, published 1919)
- Mario Castelnuovo-Tedesco: Fioretti (voice and orchestra, 1920)
- Gian Francesco Malipiero: San Francesco d'Assisi (soloists, chorus and orchestra, 1920–21)
- Hermann Suter: Le Laudi (The Praises) or Le Laudi di San Francesco d'Assisi, based on the Canticle of the Sun, (oratorio, 1923)
- Amy Beach: Canticle of the Sun (soloists, chorus and orchestra, 1928)
- Paul Hindemith: Nobilissima Visione (ballet 1938)
- Leo Sowerby: Canticle of the Sun (cantata for mixed voices with accompaniment for piano or orchestra, 1944)
- Francis Poulenc: Quatre petites prières de saint François d'Assise (men's chorus, 1948)
- Seth Bingham: The Canticle of the Sun (cantata for chorus of mixed voices with soli ad lib. and accompaniment for organ or orchestra, 1949)
- William Walton: Cantico del sol (chorus, 1973–74)
- Olivier Messiaen: St. François d'Assise (opera, 1975–83)
- Juliusz Łuciuk: Święty Franciszek z Asyżu (oratorio for soprano, tenor, baritone, mixed chorus and orchestra, 1976)
- Peter Janssens: Franz von Assisi, Musikspiel (Musical play, text: Wilhelm Wilms, 1978)
- Michele Paulicelli: Forza venite gente (musical theater, 1981)
- John Michael Talbot: Troubador of the Great King (1981), double-LP composed in honor of the 800th birthday of Francis of Assisi.
- Karlheinz Stockhausen: Luzifers Abschied (1982), scene 4 of the opera Samstag aus Licht
- Libby Larsen: I Will Sing and Raise a Psalm (SATB chorus and organ, 1995)
- Sofia Gubaidulina: Sonnengesang (solo cello, chamber choir and percussion, 1997)
- Steve Heitzeg: "Lord, Make Me an Instrument of Your Peace" from Blessed Are the Peacemakers (SATB chorus and orchestra, 1997)
- Juventude Franciscana: Balada de Francisco (voices accompanied by guitar, 1999)
- Angelo Branduardi: L'infinitamente piccolo (album, 2000)
- Lewis Nielson: St. Francis Preaches to the Birds (chamber concerto for violin, 2005)
- Peter Reulein (composer) / Helmut Schlegel (libretto): Laudato si' (oratorio, 2016)
- Daniel Dorff: Flowers of St. Francis (solo for Bass Clarinet, 2013)
- Mel Hornyak & Elliot Valentine Lee: Litany of the Martyrs, appears in Adamandi (musical number, 2022)
- Philipp Ortmeier: Cantico delle Creature (flute, harp and SATB chorus, 2025)

=== Selected biographical books ===
Hundreds of books have been written about him. The following suggestions are from Franciscan friar Conrad Harkins (1935–2020), director of the Franciscan Institute at St. Bonaventure University.

- Paul Sabatier, Life of St. Francis of Assisi (Scribner's, 1905).
- Johannes Jørgensen, St. Francis of Assisi: A Biography (translated by T. O'Conor Sloane; Longmans, 1912).
- Arnaldo Fortini, Francis of Assisi (translated by Helen Moak, Crossroad, 1981).
- Nikos Kazantzakis, Saint Francis (Ο Φτωχούλης του Θεού, in Greek; 1954)
- John Moorman, St. Francis of Assisi (SPCK, 1963)
- John Moorman, "The Spirituality of St. Francis of Assisi" (Our Sunday Visitor, 1977).
- Erik Doyle, St. Francis and the Song of Brotherhood (Seabury, 1981).
- Raoul Manselli, St. Francis of Assisi (translated by Paul Duggan; Franciscan, 1988).

=== Other ===
- In Rubén Darío's poem "Los Motivos del Lobo" ("The Reasons of the Wolf") Francis tames a terrible wolf only to discover that the human heart harbours darker desires than those of the beast.
- In Fyodor Dostoevsky's The Brothers Karamazov, Ivan Karamazov invokes the name of "Pater Seraphicus", an epithet applied to Francis, to describe Alyosha's spiritual guide Zosima. The reference is found in Goethe's Faust, Part 2, Act 5, lines 11,918–25.
- In Mont Saint Michel and Chartres, Henry Adams' chapter on the "Mystics" discusses Francis extensively.
- Francesco's Friendly World was a 1996–97 direct-to-video Christian animated series produced by Lyrick Studios that was about Francesco and his talking animal friends as they rebuild the Church of San Damiano.
- Rich Mullins co-wrote Canticle of the Plains, a musical, with Mitch McVicker. Released in 1997, it was based on the life of Francis of Assisi, but told as a Western story.
- G. K. Chesterton's book St. Francis of Assisi, a biographical and philosophical explanation of Francis
- Elizabeth Goudge, the Twentieth century Church of England author, wrote a biography, My God and my all; the life of St. Francis of Assisi (Coward-McCann, New York, 1959); also known as, Saint Francis of Assisi (Gerald Duckworth, London, 1963)

== See also ==
- Feast of Saint Francis
- St. François d'Assise, an opera by Olivier Messiaen
- Blessing of animals
- Fraticelli
- List of places named after St. Francis
- Pardon of Assisi
- St. Francis of Assisi, patron saint archive
- Society of St. Francis
- St. Benedict's Cave, which contains a portrait of Francis made during his lifetime
- Juniper, one of Francis' original followers
- Wolf of Gubbio
- Trinitarian indwelling

=== Prayers ===
- Canticle of the Sun, a prayer by Francis
- Little Office of the Passion, composed by Francis
- Prayer of St. Francis, a prayer often misattributed to Francis
