= Franco (name) =

Franco is a surname that is common in Italy, Portugal, Spain, and Sephardic Jewish communities deriving from the word "Frank", in reference to the Germanic tribe of the Franks, who invaded Gaul during the Migration Period. It is also commonly used as a given name in Italian. It is a form of the masculine given name Frank.

== Surname ==
=== Arts ===
- Daniel Franco (designer), American fashion designer
- Dave Franco, American actor
- Diana Franco, Colombian actress
- Eva Franco (1906–1999), Argentine actress
- Fulvia Franco, Italian actress, model and beauty pageant titleholder
- Giacomo Franco (etcher), Italian etcher and publisher
- Hernando Franco, Spanish composer
- James Franco, American actor
- Jesús Franco, Spanish director, brother of Ricardo Franco
- José Franco (poet), Panamanian poet
- Larry J. Franco, American film producer
- Pippo Franco, Italian actor, comedian, television presenter and singer
- Ricardo Franco (director), Spanish director, brother of Jesús Franco
- Tom Franco, American actor
- Tony DeFranco, Canadian musician
- Valerie Franco, American drummer

=== Politics ===
- Anielle Franco (born 1985), Brazilian politician
- El Franco Lee (1949–2016), American politician
- Federico Franco (born 1962), former president of Paraguay
- Francisco Franco (1892–1975), Spanish general, dictator and head of state
- Franco Quirin, Mauritian politician
- Gustavo Franco (born 1956), Brazilian central banker
- Itamar Franco (1930–2011), president of Brazil
- João Franco (1855–1929), prime minister of Portugal
- Julio César Franco (politician) (born 1951), former vice president of Paraguay
- Manuel Franco (1871–1919), president of Paraguay
- Marielle Franco (1979–2018), Brazilian activist and politician
- Rafael Franco (1896–1973), president of Paraguay
- Vasili Franco (born 1992), German politician

=== Sports ===
- Alan Franco (footballer, born 1996), Argentine centre-back
- Daniel Franco (Brazilian footballer) (born 1971), Brazilian manager and former left-back
- Daniel Franco (Argentine footballer) (born 1991), Argentine centre-back
- Danny Franco (born 1973), Israeli basketball coach in the Israeli Basketball Premier League
- Darío Franco (born 1969), Argentine football manager
- Eduardo Franco Raymundo (1934–1996), Spanish chess master
- Felipe Franco (born 1982), Brazilian water polo player
- Francisco Di Franco (born 1995), Argentine footballer
- Godwin Franco (born 1985), Indian footballer
- Guillermo Franco (born 1976), Argentine-Mexican footballer
- Guillermo Franco (footballer, born 1983), Argentine defender
- John Franco (born 1960), American baseball pitcher
- José Franco (baseball) (born 2000), Venezuelan baseball player
- Julio Franco (born 1958), baseball player from the Dominican Republic
- Leo Franco (born 1977), Argentine footballer
- Leryn Franco (born 1982), Paraguayan javelin thrower and model
- Maikel Franco (born 1992), Dominican baseball player
- Manuel Franco (jockey) (born 1994), Puerto Rican professional jockey
- Matt Franco (born 1969), American baseball player
- Nicolás Franco (footballer) (born 1996), Argentine centre-forward
- Wander Franco (born 2001), Dominican baseball player for the Tampa Bay Rays

=== Other fields ===
- Antonio Franco (prelate) (1937–2026), Italian Roman Catholic archbishop and Vatican diplomat
- Carolina Franco, American statistician
- Divaldo Franco (1927–2025), Brazilian spiritist speaker and medium
- Filipe Soares Franco (born 1953), Portuguese football manager
- Franklin Franco (1936–2013), historian and academic from the Dominican Republic
- Julio Franco Arango (1914–1980), Colombian Roman Catholic bishop
- Luis Franco (writer) (1898–1988), Argentine writer, essayist and poet
- Ramón Franco (1896–1938), pioneer aviator and brother of Spanish dictator Francisco Franco
- Salvador Franco (died 2021), Venezuelan detainee
- Veronica Franco (1546–1591), Venetian courtesan and poet

== Given name ==
A

- Franco (bishop), Hungarian prelate
- Franco Agamenone, Argentine tennis player
- Franco Agostinelli (born 1944), Italian Catholic bishop
- Franco Albini, Italian architect
- Franco Alfano, Italian composer
- Franco Amatori, Italian economic historian
- Franco Armani (born 1986), Argentine footballer
- Franco Ascencio (born 1981), Argentine footballer
- Franco Assetto, Italian sculptor and painter

B

- Franco Balbi (born 1989), Argentine basketball player
- Franco Baldassarra (born 1998), Argentine footballer
- Franco Baresi (1960–2026), Italian footballer
- Franco Battiato, Italian singer and songwriter
- Franco Bechtholdt (born 1993), Argentine-Chilean footballer
- Franco Bellocq (born 1993), Argentine footballer
- Franco Benítez (born 1991), Argentine footballer
- Franco Bolignari (1928–2020), Italian singer
- Franco Bonera, Italian motorcycle racer
- Franco Brarda (born 1993), Argentine rugby union player

C

- Franco Calderón (born 1998), Argentine footballer
- Franco Calero (born 1989), Argentine footballer
- Franco Canever (born 1989), Argentine footballer
- Franco Cángele (born 1984), Argentine footballer
- Franco Carboni (born 2003), Argentine footballer
- Franco Carraro, Italian sports director
- Franco Castellano (born 1957), Italian actor-producer and film director
- Franco Causio, Italian footballer
- Franco Cervi (born 1994), Argentine footballer
- Franco Chiviló (born 1991), Argentine footballer
- Franco Citti, Italian actor
- Franco Colapinto (born 2003), Argentine racing driver
- Franco Columbu, Italian bodybuilder
- Franco Corelli, Italian tenor
- Franco Coria (born 1988), Argentine footballer
- Franco Costa (footballer) (born 1991), Argentine footballer
- Franco Costa (painter) (1935–2015), Italian painter
- Franco Costanzo (born 1980), Argentine footballer
- Franco Cozzo, Australian entrepreneur
- Franco Cristaldi, Italian film producer
- Franco Cristaldo (born 1996), Argentine footballer

D

- Franco Davín (born 1970), Argentine retired tennis player and coach
- Franco De Vita, Venezuelan singer
- Franco Del Giglio (born 1993), Argentine footballer
- Franco Di Santo, Argentine footballer
- Franco Dolci (born 1984), Argentine footballer

E

- Franco Escobar (born 1995), Argentine footballer
- Franco Evangelisti (composer) (1926–1980), Italian composer
- Franco Evangelisti (politician) (1923–1993), Italian politician

F

- Franco Fabrizi, Italian actor
- Franco Fagioli (born 1981), Argentine operatic countertenor
- Franco Faría (born 1995), Argentine footballer
- Franco Ferrara, Italian conductor
- Franco Ferrari (footballer, born 1987), Peruvian midfielder
- Franco Ferrari (footballer, born 1992), Argentine defender
- Franco Ferrari (footballer, born 1995), Argentine forward
- Franco Flores (footballer, born 1987), Argentine defender
- Franco Flores (footballer, born 1993), Argentine defender
- Franco Foschi, Italian politician
- Franco Fragapane (born 1993), Argentine footballer
- Franco Fraticelli, Italian film editor
- Franco Frattini, Italian politician

G

- Franco Gibbons, Palauan politician
- Franco Giraldi (1931–2020), Italian film director
- Franco Girolami (born 1992), Argentine motor racing driver
- Franco Giuseppucci (1947–1980), Italian mobster
- Franco Godoy (born 2000), Argentine footballer
- Franco Gorzelewski (born 1996), Argentine footballer
- Franco Grilla, American player of gridiron football

H

- Franco Harris (1950–2022), American football player
- Franco Hernandez (1991–2017), Filipino dancer and television personality
- Franco Herrera (born 2003), Argentine footballer

I

- Franco Ibarra (born 2001), Argentine footballer
- Franco Javier Iglesias, Cuban singer
- Franco Israel, Uruguayan footballer

J

- Franco Jara (born 1988), Argentine footballer

L

- Franco Lazzaroni (born 1988), Argentine footballer
- Franco Ledesma (born 1992), Argentine footballer
- Franco Leoni, Italian opera composer
- Franco Leys (born 1993), Argentine footballer
- Franco Lo Cascio (born 1946), birth name of Luca Damiano, Italian film director
- Franco López (born 1998), Argentine footballer
- Franco Luambo (1938–1989), Congolese musician
- Franco Lucentini, Italian writer
- Franco Luciani (born 1981), Argentine musician

M

- Franco Macri (1930–2019), Italian-Argentine contractor
- Franco Malagueño (born 1998), Argentine footballer
- Franco Malerba, Italian astronaut
- Franco Manes (born 1963), Italian politician
- Franco Marini, Italian politician
- Franco Masoni (1928–2025), Swiss lawyer and politician
- Franco Mata (born 1979), Mozambican tennis player
- Franco Mazurek (born 1993), Argentine footballer
- Franco Mendoza (born 1981), Argentine footballer
- Franco Menichelli (1941–2026), Italian gymnast
- Franco Merli (1956–2025), Italian actor
- Franco Miranda (born 1985), Argentine footballer
- Franco Modigliani, Italian-American economist
- Franco Modugno, Italian law professor and judge
- Franco Montoro (1916–1999), Brazilian politician and lawyer
- Franco Morales (born 1992), Chilean basketball player
- Franco Moretti, Italian scholar
- Franco Moschino, Italian fashion designer
- Franco Moyano (born 1997), Argentine footballer
- Franco Mussis (born 1992), Argentine footballer
- Franco Musso (born 1974), Argentine photographer

N

- Franco Navarro Jr. (born 1990), Argentine-Peruvian footballer
- Franco Negri (born 1995), Argentine footballer
- Franco Nero, Italian actor
- Franco Neto, Brazilian beach volleyball player
- Franco Niell (born 1983), Argentine footballer
- Franco Nuovo (1953–2026), Canadian journalist and television presenter

O

- Franco Orozco (born 2002), Argentine footballer
- Franco Ortolani (1943–2019), Italian academic and politician

P

- Franco Pardo (born 1997), Argentine footballer
- Franco Paredes (born 1999), Argentine footballer
- Franco Pellizotti, Italian cyclist
- Franco Peppino (born 1982), Argentine retired footballer
- Franco Pérez (footballer, born 1996), Argentine forward
- Franco Pérez (footballer, born 1998), Argentine forward
- Franco Pérez (footballer, born 2001), Uruguayan forward
- Franco Perinciolo (born 1997), Argentine footballer
- Franco Petroli (born 1998), Argentine professional footballer
- Franco Pizzicanella (born 1996), Argentine footballer
- Franco Purini (born 1941), Italian architect

Q

- Franco Quinteros (born 1998), Argentine footballer
- Franco Quiroga (born 1986), Argentine footballer

R

- Franco Racca (born 1992), Argentine retired footballer
- Franco Razzotti (born 1985), Argentine footballer
- Franco Maria Ricci, Italian art publisher
- Franco Reviglio, Italian politician
- Franco Romero (footballer, born 1995), Uruguayan right-back
- Franco Romero (footballer, born 2000), Argentine central midfielder
- Franco Russo (born 1994), Argentine footballer

S

- Franco Sacchetti, Italian poet
- Franco Sar (1933–2018), Italian decathlete
- Franco Sartori (1929–1987), Italian journalist and fashion editor
- Franco Sbuttoni (born 1989), Argentine footballer
- Franco Scaglione, Italian automobile designer
- Franco Selvaggi, Italian footballer
- Franco Semioli, Italian footballer
- Franco Simon (born 1974), Indian singer and music composer
- Franco Sivetti (born 1998), Argentine footballer
- Franco Soldano (born 1994), Argentine footballer
- Franco Sosa (footballer, born 1981), Argentine defender
- Franco Sosa (footballer, born 1983), Uruguayan midfielder
- Franco Sosa (footballer, born 1995), Argentine forward
- Franco Sosa (footballer, born 1999), Argentine forward
- Franco Squillari (born 1975), Argentine retired tennis player

T

- Franco Testa (1938–2025), Italian cyclist
- Franco Toloza (born 1994), Argentine footballer
- Franco Troyansky (born 1997), Argentine footballer

U

- Franco Uncini, Italian motorcycle racer

V

- Franco Vázquez (born 1989), Argentine footballer
- Franco Velarde (born 1994), Chilean rugby union player
- Franco Vezzoni (born 2001), Argentine footballer

W

- Franco Watson (born 2002), Argentine footballer

Z

- Franco Zapiola (born 2001), Argentine footballer
- Franco Zeffirelli (1923–2019), Italian film director
- Franco Zuculini (born 1990), Argentine footballer

== See also ==
- Franco (disambiguation)
- DeFranco, a list of people with the surname
- Di Franco, a list of people with the surname
- Franko (name)
