= Franko =

Franko may refer to:

- Franko (name), a given name and surname
- Franko (bishop of Poznań), 11th-century Polish bishop
- FranKo, a British pop rock band
- Franko: The Crazy Revenge, a 1994 computer game
- Franko Escarpment, Antarctica

== See also ==
- Franco (disambiguation)
