= Franko (name) =

Franko is a given name and a surname. Notable people with the name include:

== Given name ==
- Franko (bishop of Poznań), 11th-century Polish bishop
- Franko Andrijašević (born 1991), Croatian footballer
- Franko B, Franko Bosisio (born 1960), Italian performance artist
- Franko Bogdan (born 1965), Croatian footballer
- Franko Božac (born 1974), Croatian accordionist
- Franko Burraj (born 1998), Albanian sprinter
- Franko Bushati (born 1985), Albanian basketball player
- Franko Grgić (born 2003), Croatian swimmer
- Franko Kaštropil (born 1984), Croatian basketball player
- Franko Kovačević (born 1999), Croatian footballer
- Franko Luin (1941–2005), Italian-born Swedish type designer of Slovene origin
- Franko Nakić (born 1972), Croatian-born Greek basketball player
- Franko Šango (born 1992), Croatian basketball player
- Franko Simatović (born 1950), Serbian intelligence officer of Croatian descent
- Franko Škugor (born 1987), Croatian tennis player
- Franko Uzelac (born 1994), Croatian footballer

== Nickname or pseudonym ==
- Franko Fraize, British rapper
- Franko House (born 1994), American basketball player

== Surname ==
- Ivan Franko (1856–1916), Ukrainian writer and political activist
- Jure Franko (born 1962), Slovenian-Yugoslav alpine skier
- Mariana Franko (died after 1777), free colored in Curaçao in the Dutch West Indies
- Martina Franko (born 1976), Canadian soccer player
- Matej Franko (born 2001), Slovak footballer
- Nahan Franko (1861–1930), American violinist, conductor, and concert promoter
- Oksana Franko (1939–2021), Ukrainian historian, ethnologist, archivist and educator
- Petro Franko (1890–1941), Ukrainian educator, military leader, and politician
- Sam Franko (1857–1937), American violinist and conductor

== See also ==
- Franco (name)
