= Vila Boa =

Vila Boa may refer to the following places:

== Brazil ==
- Vila Boa, Goiás, a municipality in the State of Goiás

== Portugal ==
- Vila Boa (Barcelos), a civil parish in the municipality of Barcelos
- Vila Boa (Mirandela), a former civil parish in the municipality of Mirandela
- Vila Boa (Sabugal), a civil parish in the municipality of Sabugal

Other variants

- Vila Boa de Ousilhão, a parish in the municipality of Vinhais
- Vila Boa de Quires, a parish in the municipality of Marco de Canaveses
- Vila Boa do Bispo, a parish in the municipality of Marco de Canaveses
- Vila Boa do Mondego, a parish in the municipality of Celorico da Beira
- Franco e Vila Boa, a parish in the municipality of Mirandela
