= Gianfranco =

- Gender: Male

Origin
- Origin: Italy

Other names
- Related names: Gianni, Giovanni, Francesco, English: John, Frank, Francis

Gianfranco is a compound Italian given name, consisting of Gian- and Franco. Gian- comes from Giovanni and is used in compound names. It is closest to John or French Jean. Gianni means "God is gracious" and Franco means "Free man" or "Frenchman", a contracted form of Francesco.

Notable people with the given name include:

- Gianfranco Bellini (1924–2006), Italian actor and voice actor
- Gianfranco Brancatelli (born 1950), Italian racing driver
- Gianfranco Calligarich (1939–2024), Italian novelist, screenwriter and dramatist
- Gianfranco Dettori (born 1951), Italian jockey, father of Frankie Dettori
- Gianfranco Ferré (1944–2007), Italian fashion designer
- Gianfranco Fini (born 1952), Italian politician
- Gianfranco Parolini (1925–2018), Italian film director
- Gianfranco Rotondi (born 1960), Italian politician
- Gianfranco Sanguinetti (1948–2025), Italian writer
- Gianfranco Seramondi (born 1958), Swiss footballer
- Gianfranco Zola (born 1966), Italian footballer

== See also ==
- Gianfranco Lotti, an Italian handbag company
- John (first name)
- Francis (given name)
- Franco (disambiguation)
- Giovanni (name)
