= Doman: Grzechy Ardana =

- Developer: World Software
- Publisher: Mirage Software
- Designer: Mariusz Pawluk
- Programmer: Tomasz Tomaszek
- Artist: Mariusz Pawluk
- Composer: Sławomir Mrozek
- Platform: Amiga
- Release: POL: 1994
- Genre: Beat 'em up
- Modes: Single player, Multiplayer

Doman: Grzechy Ardana (English: Doman: Sins of Ardan) is a side-scrolling hack and slash beat 'em up video game released by the Polish developer World Software for the Amiga in 1995. Taking on a sword and sorcery theme akin to Conan The Barbarian, it is a spiritual successor to World Software's earlier game Franko: The Crazy Revenge and is based on the artist's Mariusz Pawluk's unpublished short story that is included alongside the game. It ended up being World Software's last release for the Amiga (the developer did later develop a more family-friendly Draggy & Croco, but the publisher they picked for this game forgot to put the game onto the shelves despite being essentially complete).

== Gameplay ==
Like World Software's previous game Franko, Doman is an arcade-style hack 'n' slash game. As either the titular barbarian warrior Doman, the Nordic Baurus, or both - as co-operative play is possible - the player(s) take on Ardan and his army through five stages. Starting out with a sword, the player would occasionally encounter a non-player character that would grant either a bit of healing or a different weapon (due to a technical limitation the player character would revert to the sword when traversing through the river). Once during the course of the campaign the player also has to do a waggling mini-game to wake the player character up to fend off the assassin intent on killing him in his sleep.

Doman utilizes the control scheme involving directions and a single fire button common with the Amiga games. The player can do a jump slash that can evade some attacks but does little damage, a slash that can be set up into a throw, an overhead slash that does moderate amount of damage and a special heavy attack that is dependent on the weapon used. The player can also stab downed enemies.

== Development ==
Compared to the less serious Franko, Doman was meant to be a more serious game and the only intentionally comedic aspects they've included in the game consist of Franko making a cameo appearance in cut-scenes, as well as the presence of the Kalashnikov weapon as one of the cheat codes.

The code for Doman took several months to write, and it was completely rewritten from scratch rather than based on Franko, part of the artist's philosophy to never re-use much of the code for future projects. They've initially split the character sprites into lower and upper bodies to allow them to carry different weapons independently to save disk space, but the screen synchronization issues caused by this approach made them to have just full sprites for characters using different weapons, which led to the swamp stages having the player revert to the default sword weapon. The corpses also fade away unlike Franko having corpses stay (done by "painting" the corpses onto the background in memory) as the developers preferred to have a more convincing effect if they could.

By accessing the Retroattack! Website, by Polish company Mirage Interactive, players could legally download around 60 Polish classics for Atari, Amiga and PC including Mózgprocesor, Janosik, Rooster, Taekwondo Master, Doman, and Franko: The Crazy Revenge.

The game's music was intended to be in theme of Conan the Barbarian, though the game's composer would later question if this comes through in the final version. Meanwhile, graphics were created in Deluxe Paint.

== Reception ==
AmigaOS felt the title was more " thought-out and developed" than its predecessor. PPE noted that the game was quite violent, even more so than Franko.

While both Franko and Doman brought in an adequate profit, the developers were not able to satisfactorily pay themselves, so they sought out a new publisher for future games.

The game was also reviewed for magazines Świat Gier Komputerowych, Gry Komputerowe and Computer Studio Wydanie Specjalne.
