= Pasquale Veladini =

Swiss printer and politician

- Born: 11 July 1811; Lugano, Switzerland
- Died: 21 January 1874 (aged 62); Lugano, Switzerland
- Occupations: Printer, publisher, bookseller, politician
- Spouse: Antonia Bignetti
- Parent(s): Francesco Veladini; Francesca Guioni
- Relatives: Antonio Veladini (brother); Giovanni Antonio Veladini (brother)

Pasquale Veladini (11 July 1811 – 21 January 1874) was a Swiss printer, publisher, and politician from Lugano. He was the proprietor of Veladini, one of Ticino's principal printing houses for over three decades and served in various leadership roles in Lugano's municipal government and commercial enterprises.

== Early life and career ==
Veladini was born on 11 July 1811 in Lugano to Francesco Veladini, a printer, and Francesca Guioni. He was educated at the Collège Saint-Antoine de Lugano. He worked as editor of the Gazzetta Ticinese, which was published by his father's printing house.

== Printing business ==
Following his father's death in 1836, Veladini took over the family printing business together with his brothers Antonio and Giovanni Antonio. The enterprise remained one of the canton's principal printing houses for more than a century. From 1840, Veladini became the sole proprietor and managed both the printing house and its associated bookshop until his death in 1874.

== Political and business activities ==
Veladini served as a municipal councillor and vice-mayor of Lugano from 1863 to 1874. He chaired the boards of directors of the Navigation Society and the Lake Lugano Railway, and served as chairman of the board of the Banca della Svizzera Italiana from 1873 to 1874.

== Personal life ==
Veladini married Antonia Bignetti. He died in Lugano on 21 January 1874.

== Bibliography ==
- Onoranze funebri a Pasquale Veladini [...] (1874)
- F. Mena, Stamperie ai margini d'Italia (2003), especially pp. 277–280
