= Guillermo Franco (disambiguation) =

Guillermo Franco may refer to:

- Guillermo Franco (born 1976), Argentine-Mexican football striker
- Guillermo Franco (footballer, born 1983), Argentine football defender
- Guillermo Franco (Ecuadorian general) (1811-1873), Ecuadorian historical figure

== See also ==
- Guillermo Francos (born 1950) Argentine politician and Chief of Cabinet from March 2024 to October 2025
- Guilherme Franco (born 1946), Brazilian jazz percussionist
