= Oratory of San Francesco Piccolino =

Pilgrimage site in Assisi, Italy

Coordinates: 43°04′13″N 12°36′57″E

Oratorio di San Francesco Piccolino
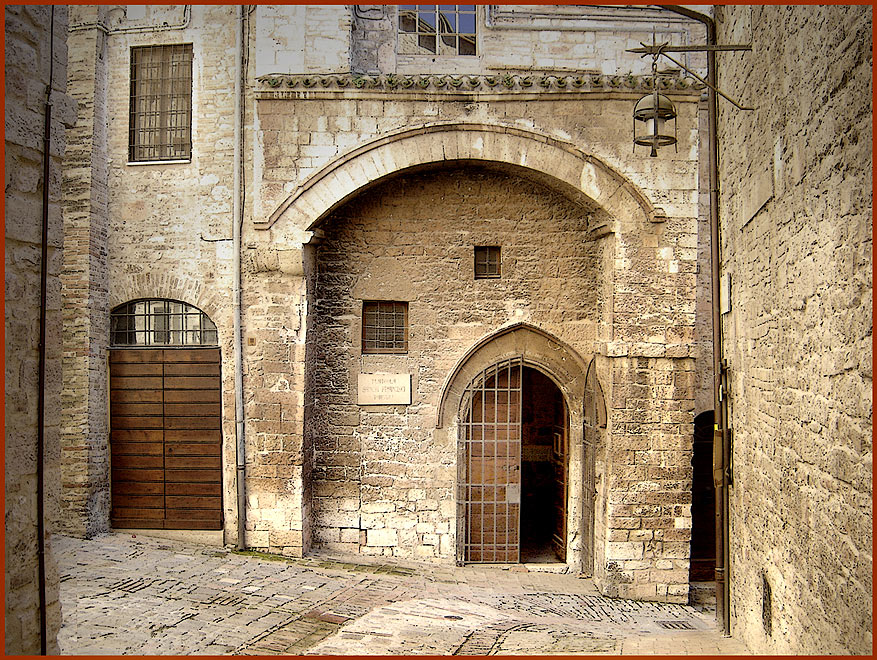
- Oratorio di San Francesco Piccolino
- Location: Piazzetta di San Francisco Piccolino, Assisi
- Country: Italy
- Denomination: Catholic Church
- Religious order: Franciscans

Administration
- Diocese: Roman Catholic Diocese of Assisi-Nocera Umbra-Gualdo Tadino

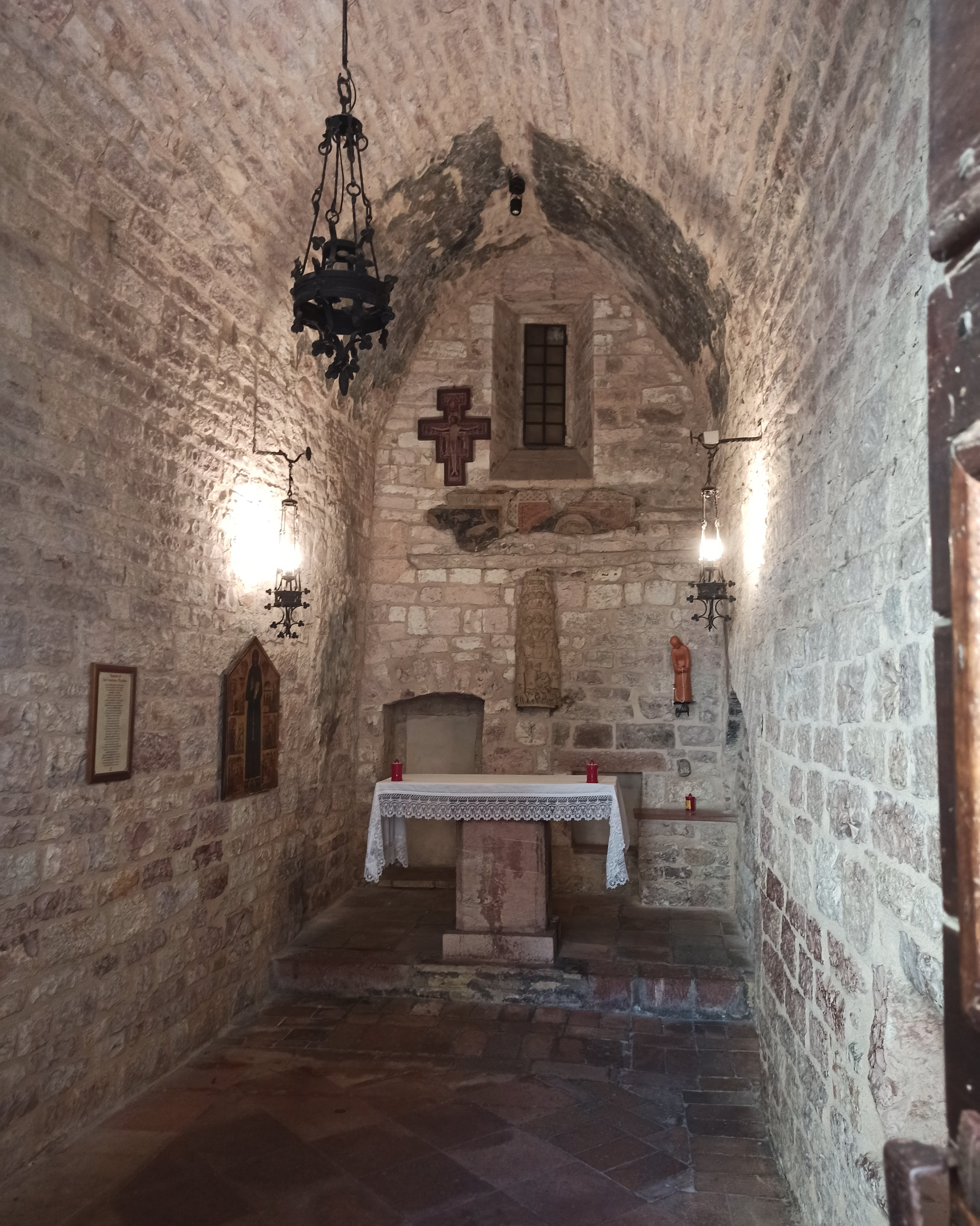
Interior of the chapel

The Oratory of San Francesco Piccolino, or the Chapel of Little St Francis is a small devotional oratory in the centre of Assisi, near the Chiesa Nuova held by pious tradition to be the birthplace of Francis of Assisi. Many have falsely considered it to be the saints childhood home.

It was constructed in the late 13th century thanks to the initiative of Piccardo, nephew of the saint. Previously adorned with frescoes dating from the 13th to the 15th century, in 1926 it was restored to its original bare appearance.

== Legend of Francis's birth ==
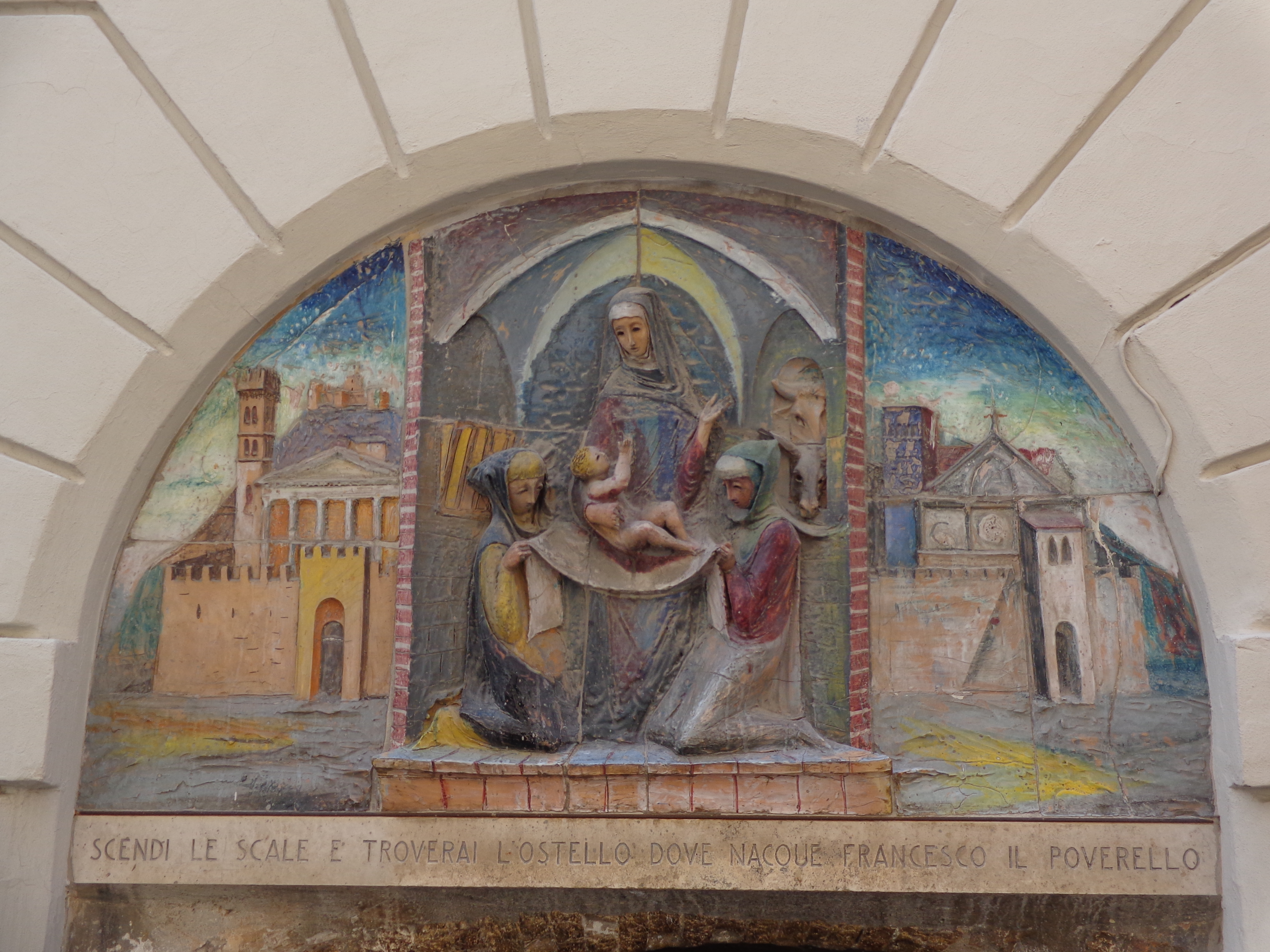
Image of the birth of Francis with the animals looking on in the tympanum of the arched passage leading to the Chapel

The arch over the door bears the following inscription in Latin:

"Hoc oratorium fuit bovis: et asini stabulum in quo natus est sanctus Franciscus mundi speculum."

Which in English reads:

"This oratory was the stable of the ox and ass in which was born Saint Francis, the mirror of the world."

This inscription reflects the legend that Francis was born to his mother in a stable in the presence of livestock, just as the Gospel according to Luke depicts the Nativity of Jesus. The story is not part of either Bonaventure's or Thomas of Celano's Lives of Francis, nor is it to be found in the famous Little Flowers of Saint Francis. It does not appear until at least the late 14th century and the inscription and chapel themselves are the earliest surviving record, dated to between 1316 and 1354.

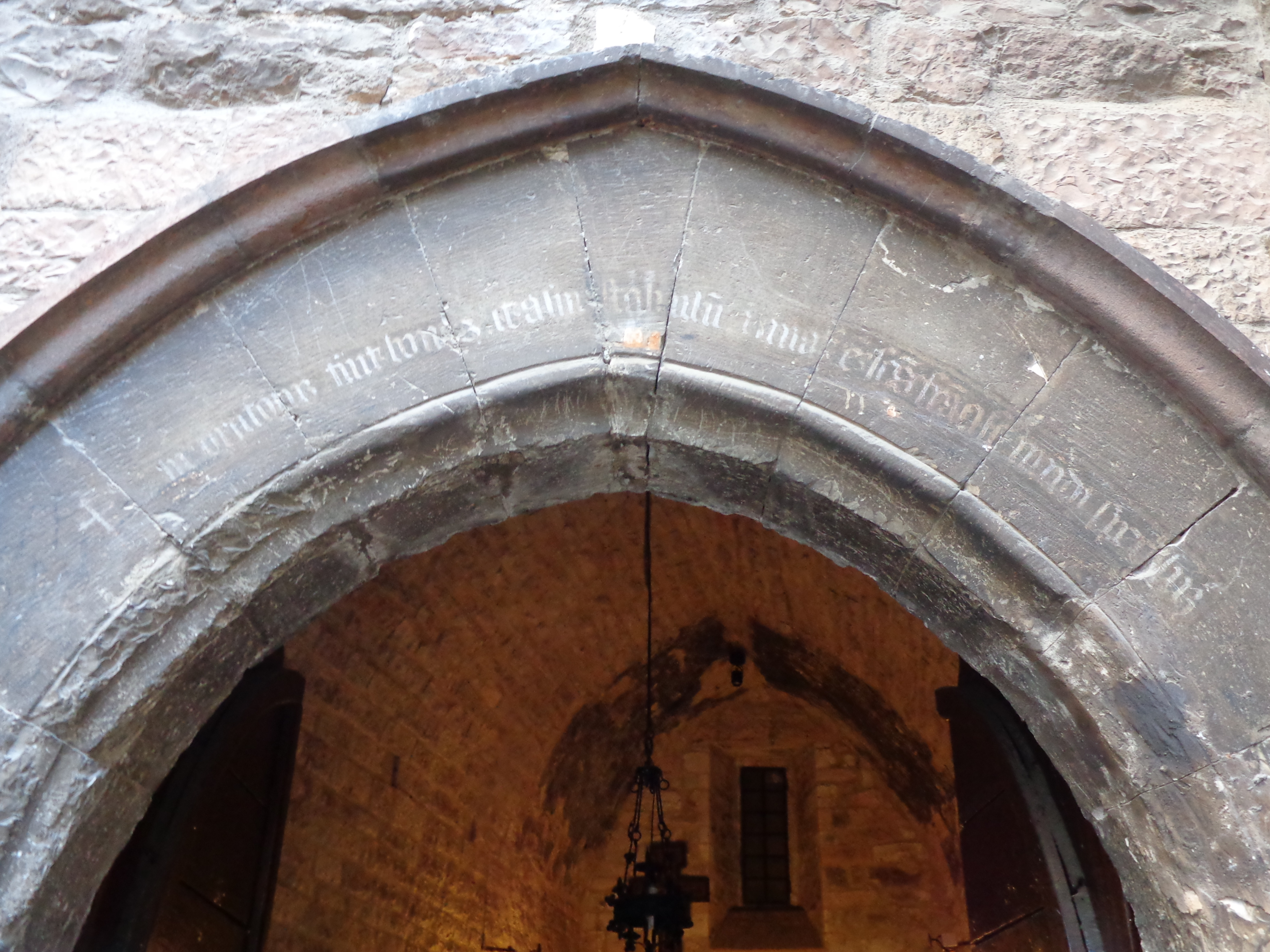
Inscription over the door

The legend is part of the broader narrative of Francis total imitation of Christ with a life of poverty and preaching reaching a crescendo in his stigmata of 1224. The idea of a Christlike birth, of which there are various other legends appealing to other themes from the Gospel accounts, appealed to the medieval imagination. The idea of a birth among animals also accords well with the image of Francis as a lover of nature and animals.
