= The Flowers of St. Francis =

Francesco, giullare di Dio
- Directed by: Roberto Rossellini
- Written by: Roberto Rossellini; Federico Fellini
- Produced by: Angelo Rizzoli
- Starring: Aldo Fabrizi; Gianfranco Bellini; Peparuolo
- Cinematography: Otello Martelli
- Edited by: Jolanda Benvenuti
- Music by: Renzo Rossellini; Enrico Buondonno
- Distributed by: Joseph Burstyn Inc. (US)
- Release date: 14 December 1950
- Running time: 89 minutes
- Country: Italy
- Language: Italian

The Flowers of St. Francis (in Italian, Francesco, giullare di Dio, or "Francis, God's Jester") is a 1950 film directed by Roberto Rossellini and co-written by Federico Fellini. The film is based on two books, the 14th-century novel Fioretti di San Francesco (Little Flowers of St. Francis) and La Vita di Frate Ginepro (The Life of Brother Juniper), both of which relate the life and work of St. Francis and the early Franciscans. I Fioretti is composed of 78 small chapters. The novel as a whole is less biographical and instead focuses on relating tales of the life of St. Francis and his followers. The movie follows the same premise, though rather than relating all 78 chapters, it focuses instead on nine of them. Each chapter is composed in the style of a parable and, like parables, contains a moral theme. Every new scene transitions with a chapter marker, a device that directly relates the film to the novel. On October 6, 1952, when the movie debuted in America, where the novel was much less known, the chapter markers were removed.

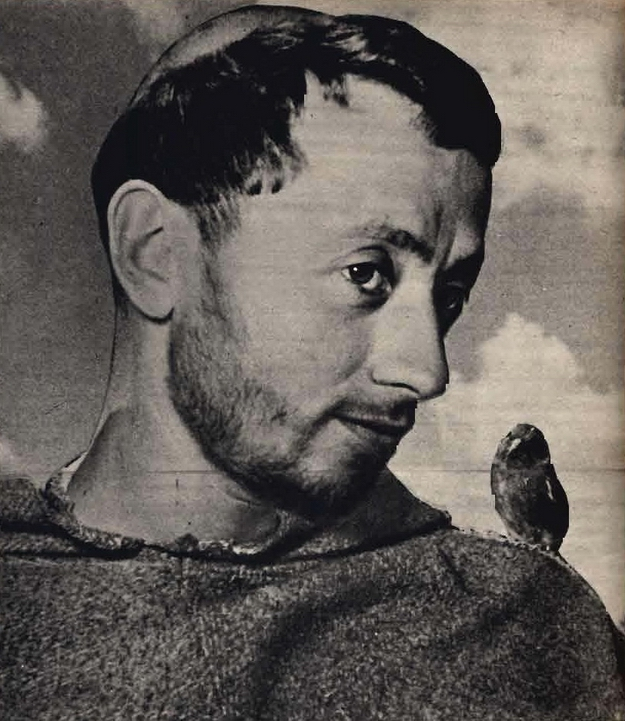
Brother Nazario Gerardi as St. Francis of Assisi

Included in the acting cast is Gianfranco Bellini as the narrator, who has voice-dubbed several American films for the Italian cinema. Monks from the Nocere Inferiore Monastery played the roles of St. Francis and the friars. Playing the role of St. Francis is a Franciscan brother who is not credited, Brother Nazario Gerardi. The only professional actor in the film is the prominent Aldo Fabrizi, who had worked with Rossellini before, notably in the neorealistic film Rome, Open City. The film garnered international acclaim for Fabrizi. He began his film career scene in 1942 and is noted for both writing and directing his own vehicles. In this film, Fabrizi plays the role of Nicolaio, the tyrant of Viterbo.

Rossellini had a strong interest in Christian values in the contemporary world. Though he was not a practicing Catholic, Rossellini loved the Church's ethical teaching and was enchanted by religious sentiment—things that were neglected in the materialistic world. This interest helped to inspire the making of the film. He also employed two priests to work on it with him, Félix A. Morlion O.P., and Antonio Lisandri O.F.M. Though the priests contributed little to the script, their presence within the movie gave a feel of respectability with regard to theology. Morlion vigorously defended Catholic foundations within Italian neorealism and felt that Rossellini's work, and eventually scriptwriter Fellini's, best captured this foundation.

== Chapters ==
The movie begins by portraying the Franciscan friars trudging through the rain to their hut, only to find it occupied by a peasant and his donkey. The man accuses the Franciscans of being thieves and drives them out, but the friars see this as a sign to follow the footsteps of St. Francis.

The film is divided into nine chapters, each depicting a significant incident in St. Francis' life after his vocation. These chapters are introduced by a parable and a chapter marker.

In the first chapter, Brother Ginepro returns to St. Mary of the Angels naked after giving away his habit to a beggar. St. Francis gently admonishes him for his naive generosity.

The second chapter focuses on Giovanni, known as "the Simpleton," who asks to follow Francis and begins imitating him in word and gesture. Despite some obstacles, Giovanni is welcomed as a fellow Franciscan.

The third chapter portrays the wonderful meeting between St. Clare and St. Francis at St. Mary of the Angels. They share a holy dinner together, and their conversation is described as igniting the sky with fire.

In the fourth chapter, Brother Ginepro cuts off a pig's foot to make a stew for a sick brother. However, he unwittingly angers a peasant and must apologize. The peasant later returns with the rest of the pig as a gesture of reconciliation.

The fifth chapter depicts Francis praying in the woods when he encounters a leper. Despite the leper's attempts to keep his distance, Francis kisses and adores him, praising God for the encounter.

In the sixth chapter, Brother Ginepro cooks enough food for two weeks, impressing Francis with his zeal. As a result, Francis grants Ginepro permission to preach, instructing him to begin each sermon with the words, "I talk and talk yet I accomplish little."

The seventh chapter focuses on Brother Ginepro as he travels and attempts to preach. He is judged on the gallows by the tyrant Nicolaio but demonstrates humility that eventually convinces Nicolaio to spare him.

The eighth chapter presents a famous parable where Francis and Brother Leone discuss what brings perfect happiness. After considering various scenarios, Francis explains that perfect happiness lies in suffering and bearing every evil deed out of love for Christ.

In the final chapter, Francis and his friars leave St. Mary of the Angels to spread the message of the Gospel. They give away their possessions, pray together, and then set off in different directions to preach peace.

== Cast ==
- Brother Nazario Gerardi as Saint Francis of Assisi
- Brother Severino Pisacane as Brother Ginepro
- Esposito Bonaventura as Giovanni
- Aldo Fabrizi as Nicolaio, the tyrant
- Arabella Lemaître as Saint Clare of Assisi
- Brother Nazareno, Brother Raffaele and Brother Robert Sorrentino as Franciscans
- Gianfranco Bellini as the narrator

== Production ==
Rossellini had been working on a film about St. Francis for years and he later called this film his favorite of his own works. Rossellini and Federico Fellini wrote a treatment of the film that was 28 pages long and contained only 71 lines of dialogue. It was partially inspired by such St. Francis legends as the Fioretti and Life of Brother Ginepro. Rossellini said that it was not intended to be a bio-pic, but would focus on one specific aspect of St. Francis's personality: his whimsy. Rossellini described this aspect of St. Francis as "The Jester of God." The film was a series of episodes from St. Francis's life and contained no plot or character development. Rossellini received funding from Angelo Rizzoli and from the Vatican to make the film. He cast the same Franciscan monks who had appeared in his earlier film Paisà. All of the other actors were also non-professionals, except for Aldo Fabrizi.

Filming began on January 17, 1950 in the Italian countryside between Rome and Bracciano. Fellini was not present during the shooting and Rossellini depended on help with the films dialogue from Brunello Rondi and Father Alberto Maisano. During the shooting Rossellini's and Ingrid Bergman's son Renato was born on February 2, 1950, although he was not officially divorced until February 9. The film extras brought ricotta to the newborn baby during the production.

== Release and reception ==
The film premiered at the 1950 Venice Film Festival, where it was screened before a packed audience and often applauded in the middle of certain scenes. However, critics gave the film mostly poor reviews. Guido Aristarco said that it displayed a formalist and false reality. Pierre Laprohon said that "its most obvious fault is its lack of realism." Years after its release, Marcel Oms called it a "monument of stupidity." However, The New York Times film critic Bosley Crowther praised it. On its initial release, the movie earned less than $13,000 in Italy.

Pier Paolo Pasolini said that it was "among the most beautiful in Italian cinema" and Andrew Sarris ranked it eighth on his ten-best film list. François Truffaut called it "the most beautiful film in the world."

Although somewhat poorly received at the time, the film is now recognized as a classic of world cinema. It has been released on DVD by The Criterion Collection and Masters of Cinema.

In 1995, the Vatican included the film in its list of forty-five important films. In July 2021, the film was shown in the Cannes Classics section at the 2021 Cannes Film Festival.
