= Franco Masoni =

Swiss lawyer and politician

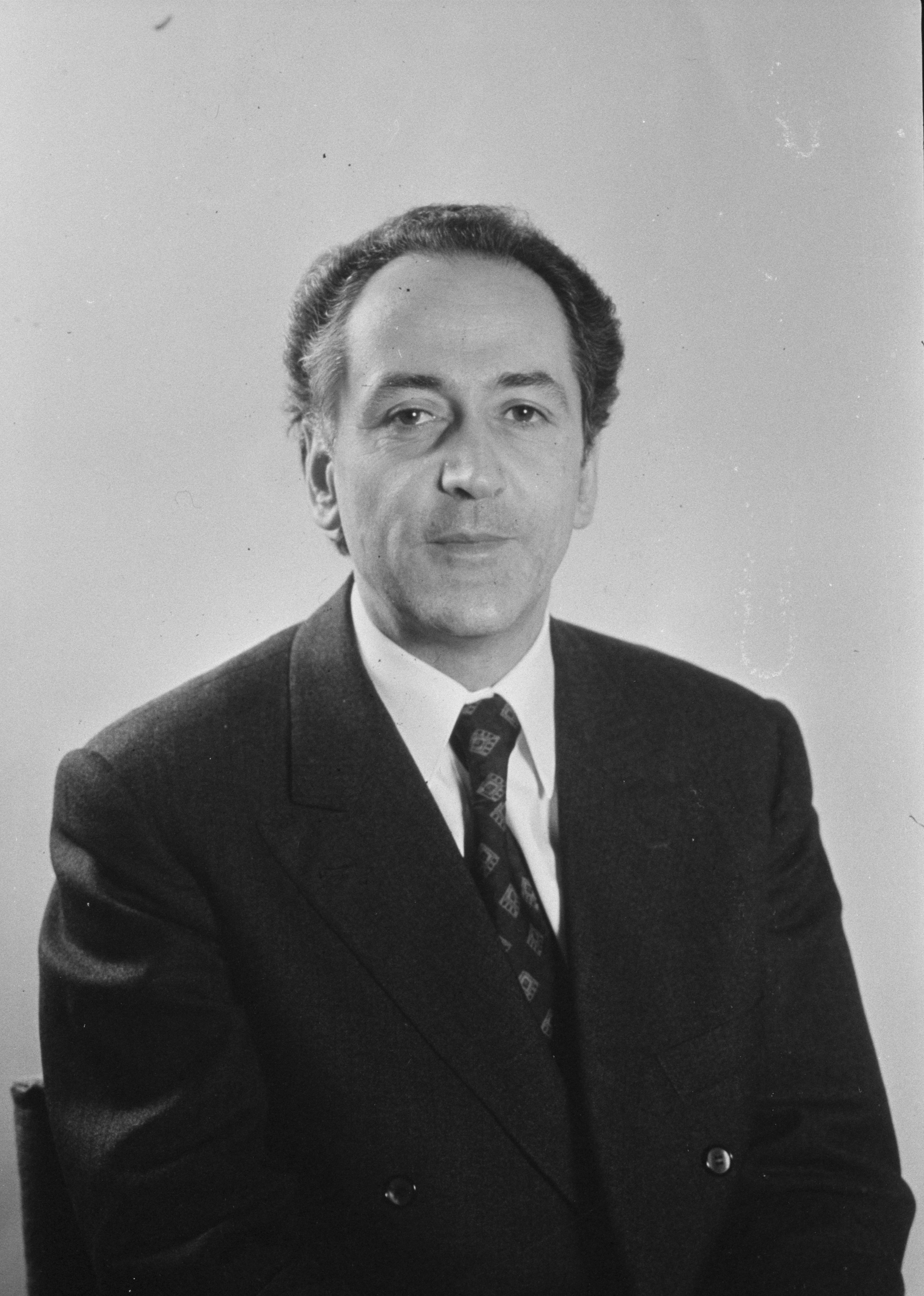

Member of the Council of States
- In office 1975–1979

Member of the National Council
- In office 1967–1975

Personal details
- Born: 5 July 1928 Lugano, Switzerland
- Died: 18 October 2025 (aged 97) Lugano, Switzerland
- Party: Radical-Democratic Party
- Spouse: Valeria Fontana (m. 1955)
- Education: University of Heidelberg; University of Bern (law degree, 1955)
- Occupation: Lawyer, notary

Franco Masoni (5 July 1928 – 18 October 2025) was a Swiss lawyer and politician from Lugano. He served in both chambers of the Swiss Federal Assembly and was a prominent figure in Ticino's Radical-Democratic Party.

== Early life and education ==
Masoni was born on 5 July 1928 in Lugano, the son of Igino Masoni, a typographer of Tuscan origin, and Marina Mazzuconi from Pregassona. After attending schools in Lugano, he studied law at the University of Heidelberg and the University of Bern, obtaining his law degree in 1955.

== Career ==
=== Legal practice ===
In 1957, Masoni opened a law and notary office in Lugano. He married Valeria Fontana in 1955, herself a lawyer who became the first female notary in the canton of Ticino. Valeria was the daughter of Cornelio Fontana of Chiasso.

=== Political career ===
Masoni joined the young liberal-radical movement of Ticino in 1946. He served as a member of the communal council (legislature) of Lugano from 1956 to 1972 and again from 1982 to 1990. He was elected deputy to the Grand Council of Ticino in 1959, serving until 1975. At the federal level, Masoni was a member of the National Council from 1967 to 1975, and subsequently served in the Council of States from 1975 to 1979 and again from 1983 to 1991.

From the 1970s onwards, Masoni became one of the leading figures of the right wing of the Liberal-Radical Party in Lugano and defined the political line of the newspaper Gazzetta Ticinese.

=== Business and cultural activities ===
Masoni served on numerous boards of directors, including those of the Swiss Bank Corporation (SBS) and the Bank of Italian Switzerland (BSI). He was the author of various publications and held leadership positions in Ticino, national, and international cultural associations.

== Death ==
Masoni died in Lugano on 18 October 2025.

== Bibliography ==
- "Franco Masoni", Gazzetta Ticinese, 22 December 1993
