= Juniper (friar) =

Early Friar Minor and follower of St. Francis of Assisi

Servant of God Juniper OFM
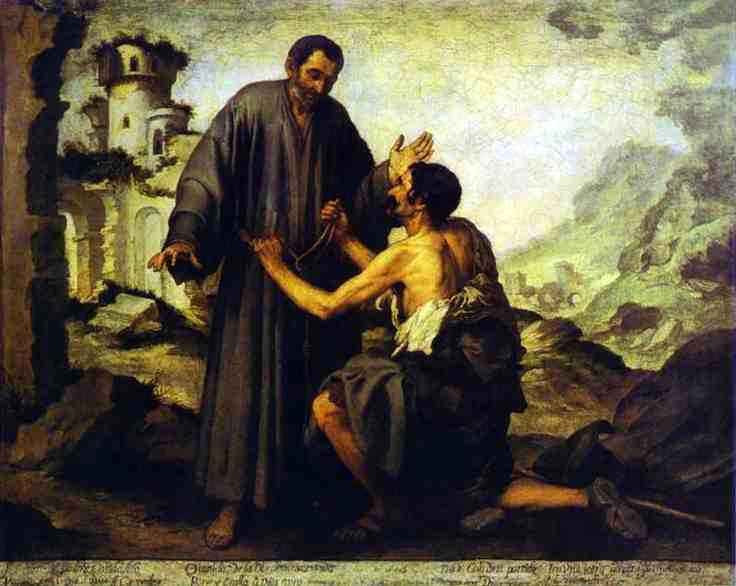
- "Brother Juniper and the Beggar" by Bartolomé Esteban Murillo (1645-1646)
- Born: before 1210
- Died: 29 January 1258

Juniper, also known as Brother Juniper (Italian: Fra Ginepro) (died 1258), called "the renowned jester of the Lord", was one of the original followers of Francis of Assisi. Not much is known about Juniper before he joined the friars. In 1210, he was received into the Order of Friars Minor by Francis himself. "Would to God, my brothers, that I had a whole forest of such Junipers," Francis would delightfully pun.

Francis sent him to establish "places" for the friars in Gualdo Tadino and Viterbo. When Clare of Assisi was dying, Juniper consoled her. Juniper is buried at Ara Coeli Church at Rome.

Junípero Serra (1713–1784), born Miquel Josep Serra i Ferrer, took his religious name in honor of Juniper when he was received into the order.

== The Legend of the pig's feet ==
Several stories about Juniper in the Little Flowers of St. Francis (Fioretti di San Francesco) illustrate his generosity and simplicity. Perhaps the most famous of these is the tale of the pig's feet.

When visiting a poor man who was sick, Juniper asked if he could perform any service for the man. The man told Juniper that he had a longing for a meal of pig's feet, and so Juniper happily ran off to find some. Capturing a pig in a nearby field, he cut off a foot and cooked the meal for the man. When the pig's owner found out about this, he came in great wrath and abused Francis and the other Franciscans, calling them thieves and refusing repayment. Francis reproached Juniper and ordered him to apologize to the pig's owner and to make amends. Juniper, not understanding why the owner should be upset at such a charitable act, went to him and cheerfully retold the tale of the pig's foot, as though he had done the man a favor.

When the man reacted with anger, Juniper thought that he had misunderstood him, so he simply repeated the story with great zeal, embraced him, and begged the man to give him the rest of the pig for the sake of charity. At this display the owner's heart was changed, and he gave up the rest of the pig to be slaughtered as Juniper had asked. The story of Juniper and the pig's feet was depicted in Roberto Rossellini's film The Flowers of St. Francis (1950).

== Other property ownership difficulties ==
On another occasion, Juniper was commanded to cease giving part of his clothing to the half-naked people he met on the road. Desiring to obey his superior, Juniper once told a man in need that he couldn't give the man his tunic, but he wouldn't prevent the man from taking it either. In time, the friars learned not to leave anything lying around, because Juniper would probably give it away.

== Silence for 6 months ==
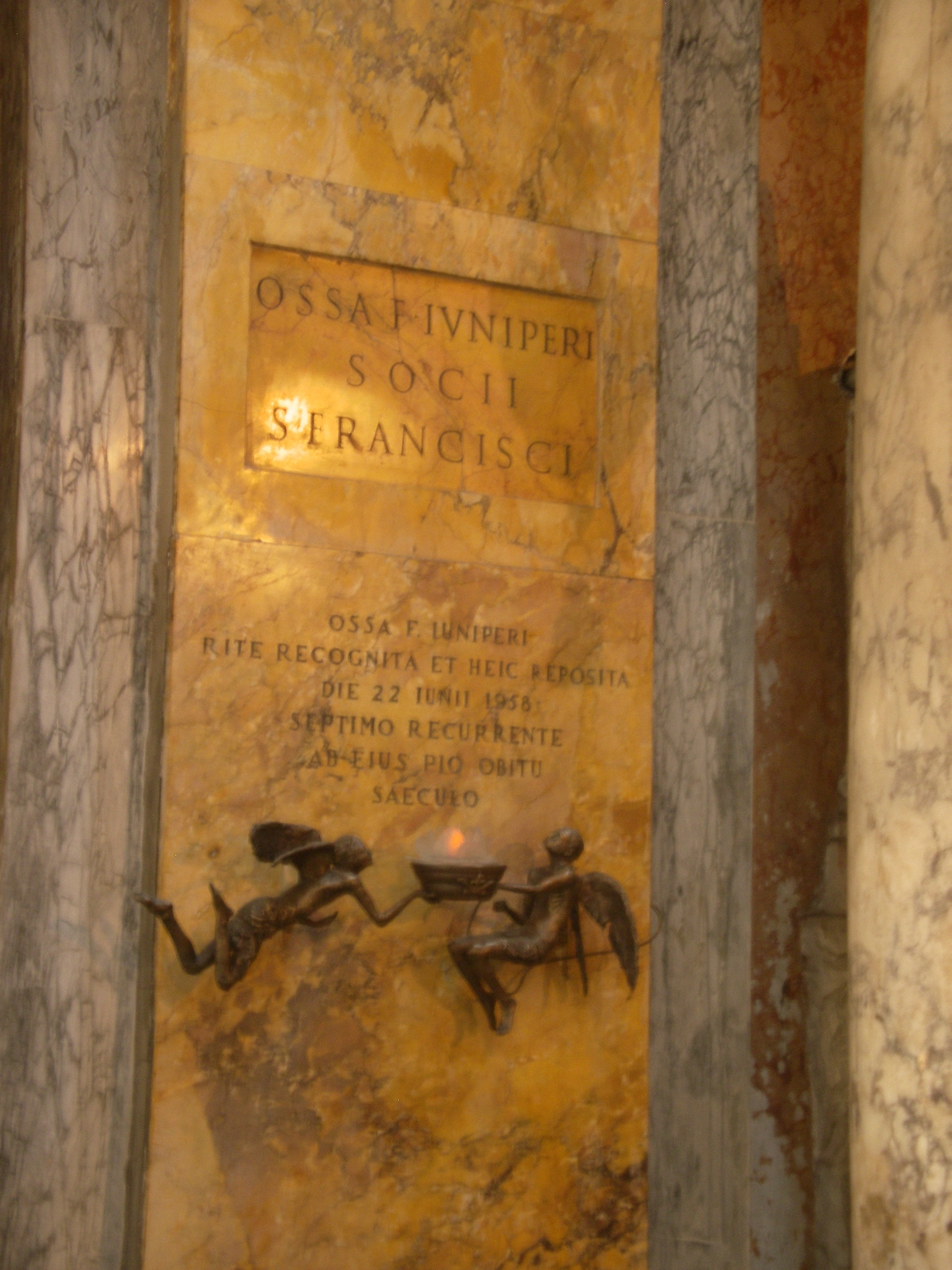
Ledger stone of Saint Juniper, colleague of St. Francis of Assisi, at Santa Maria in Aracoeli, Rome

Once, Juniper decided to keep silence for six months in this way: On the first day for the love of God the Father. On the second day for the love of His Son, Jesus Christ. On the third day for the love of the Holy Spirit. On the fourth day for reverence to the Virgin Mary, and continuing in this manner, each day for the love of a different saintly servant of God, he remained silent for six months out of devotion.

== Humility ==
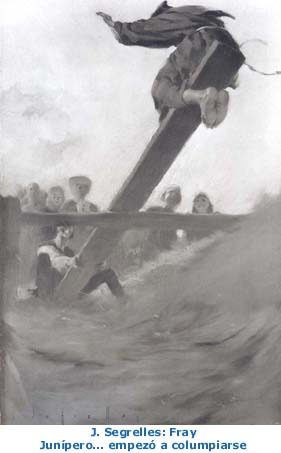
And he began to swing...

Many examples reflect the humility of this character. Here are a few:

- Juniper arrived in Rome, where the people received him with great devotion. Taking advantage of the situation, he turned that devotion into mockery and scorn for himself. He saw two boys playing on a swing, joined them, and began to swing. The crowd, surprised by this sight, showed him respect and waited for him to finish before accompanying him to the convent.

Juniper disregarded the devotion shown to him and continued swinging with enthusiasm. Some in the crowd grew tired and began to criticize him, while others, more devoted, stayed until they eventually left, leaving him alone.
Satisfied with having provoked mockery and contempt, Juniper continued his way to the convent once the crowd had dispersed.

- Juniper was left alone at the convent while the other friars went out. The Guardian asked him to prepare food for when they returned. Juniper agreed and, instead of making just the necessary amount, decided to prepare a large quantity of food for the next fifteen days. He went to the village, got large pots, meat, and vegetables, and cooked with enthusiasm, though in a very disorganized manner, leaving chickens unplucked and eggs with shells.

When the friars returned, one of them, known for understanding Juniper's simplicity, observed how the friar cooked with great fervor and enjoyed the scene. He informed the others that Juniper had made a large amount of food.
In the end, Juniper brought the food to the refectory. The food, undoubtedly in poor condition, was presented with pride, but the friars found it inedible. Angered by the waste, the Guardian severely reprimanded Juniper, who fell to the ground and confessed his fault, comparing his mistake to serious offenses.
Despite the initial disapproval, the Guardian recognized that Juniper's effort, although poorly executed, reflected great simplicity and charity. In the end, the Guardian expressed that he would rather Juniper waste food in this manner if it meant preserving his admirable simplicity and dedication.

== Foundation of a convent ==
Friar Hernán de Bratislava recounts an anecdote about Juniper being sent to establish a convent alongside other friars. During the journey, Juniper was designated to procure what the group needed. Upon arriving in a village at mealtime, Juniper began to shout in the local dialect:

"Non nu albergate?" (Aren't you hosting us?)

"Non nu recivate?" (Aren't you receiving us?)

"Non nu fate bene?" (Aren't you treating us well?)

"Non bene vestitu?" (Isn't it well deserved?)

His companions were embarrassed and reprimanded him for not seeking sustenance, but Juniper insisted on continuing to shout, as he had been chosen as procurator.

The villagers were surprised by the behavior and habit of the friars and wondered what was happening. Juniper explained that they were sinners and penitents who did not deserve hospitality. Moved by Juniper's humility and sincerity, the man offered them food and lodging, inviting them to return whenever they needed.

Later, as the friars continued their journey, they arrived at a castle. The devil, disguised as a man, warned the lord of the castle that four friars with strange habits were traitors trying to betray him. The lord sent his men to watch over them, and upon seeing the friars, they captured and attacked them fiercely. With great courage, Juniper offered himself to the punishment while his companions awaited death.

Seeing Juniper's attitude, the lord suspected that they could not be traitors. Although he allowed them to leave, he had Juniper severely beaten. Grateful, Juniper stood up, thanked the lord, and continued on his way with the other friars.

Later, the lord visited the new convent, and recognizing him, Juniper sent a gift in appreciation for the service received. When the lord learned who had sent the gift, he was surprised to discover that Juniper was the friar he had beaten. Juniper explained that his "enemy" was his own body, which he had learned to control thanks to the punishment received.

The lord, embarrassed, asked for forgiveness and from then on treated all the friars with great kindness, hosting them and treating them as friends.
