= Franco =

Franco may refer to:

== Name ==
- Franco (name)
- Francisco Franco (1892–1975), Spanish general and dictator of Spain from 1939 to 1975
- Franco Luambo (1938–1989), Congolese musician, the "Grand Maître"
- Franco Miller (born 1999), Bahamian basketballer
- Franco of Cologne (mid to late 13th century), German music theorist
- Franco of Liège (died c. 1083), mathematician
- Franco of Tongeren (died 903), bishop of Liège

== Prefix ==
- Franco, a prefix used when referring to France, a country
  - Franco, a prefix used when referring to French people and their diaspora, e.g. Franco-Americans, Franco-Mauritians
- Franco, a prefix used when referring to Franks, a West Germanic tribe

== Places ==
- Franco (Mirandela), a village in Portugal
- El Franco, a municipality of Asturias in Spain
- Presidente Franco District, in Paraguay
- Franco, Virginia, an unincorporated community, in the United States

== Other uses ==
- Franco (band), Filipino band
- Franco (General Hospital), a fictional character on the American soap opera General Hospital
- Franco, Ciccio e il pirata Barbanera, a 1969 Italian comedy film directed by Mario Amendola
- Franco, ese hombre, a 1964 documentary film by Spanish director José Luis Sáenz de Heredia
- "Franco" or "Franco-Arabic", the Arabic chat alphabet

== See also ==
- Gianfranco
- Franca (disambiguation)
- France (disambiguation)
- Francis (given name)
- Franko (disambiguation)
- Duke of Franco, a hereditary title in the Spanish nobility
