= Eckhard (bishop of Poznań) =

Polish bishop of German descent

Eckhard, Bishop of Poznań was an 11th-12th century Catholic Bishop of German descent known from records in the 16th century of the Abbey of Saints Simon and Judas in Goslar. Before being appointed Bishop he was provost of the Abbey under Franko. He served as the Bishop at the end of the reign of Władysław Herman who died 1102AD.

Religious titles
Preceded by Franko	Bishop of Poznań; 1100–1103	Succeeded by Heinrich von Siegburg
