= Davide Perino =

Italian voice actor

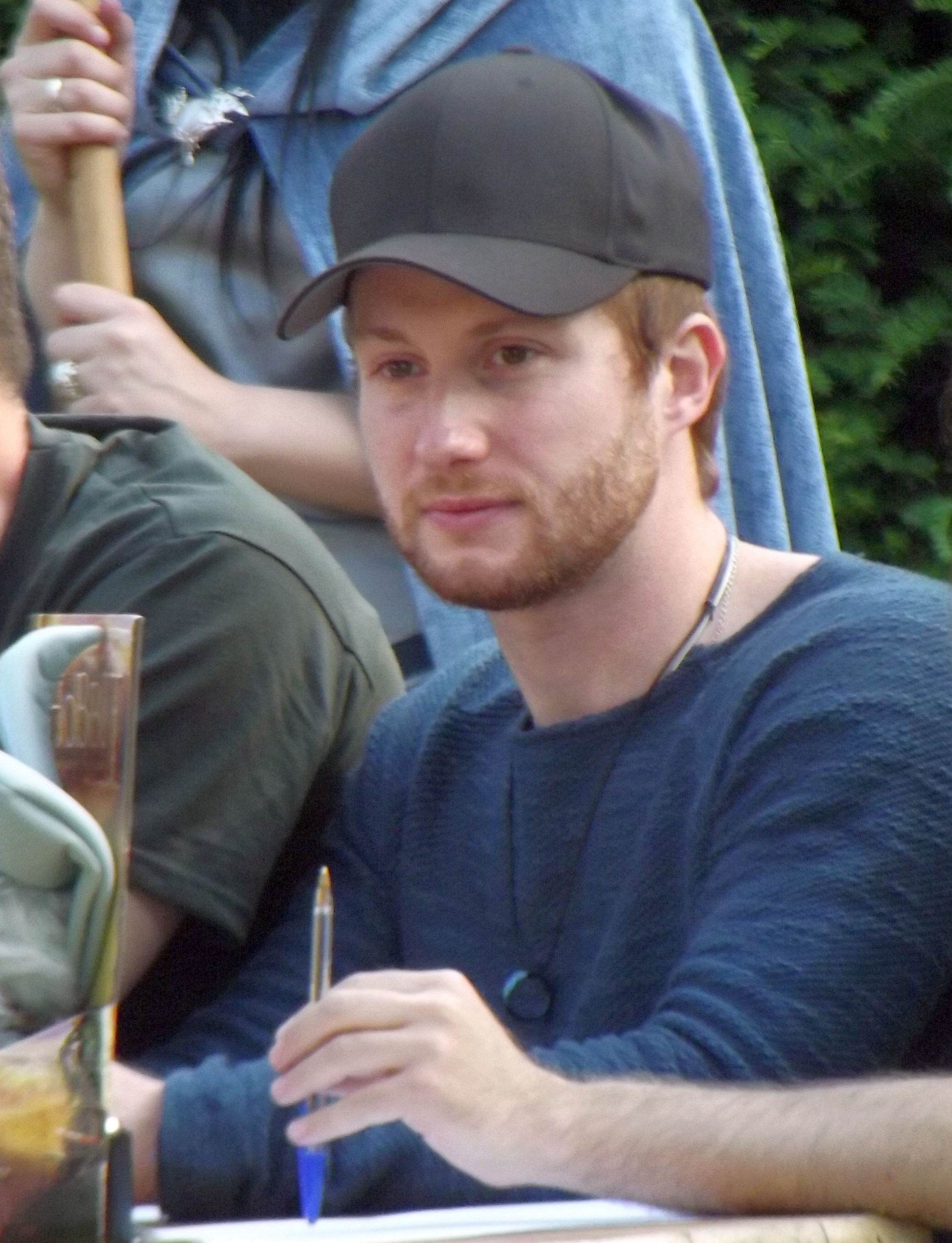
- Perino in 2014
- Born: 21 July 1981 (age 44); Rome, Italy
- Occupations: Actor; voice actor
- Years active: 1984–present
- Mother: Silvia Bellini
- Relatives: Elena Perino (sister); Gianfranco Bellini (grandfather); Celeste Aida Zanchi (great-grandmother)

Davide Perino (born 21 July 1981) is an Italian actor. He is the official Italian voice dubbing artist of Elijah Wood and Jesse Eisenberg.

== Biography ==
Born in Rome, Perino began his career as a child actor at only two and a half years of age, appearing in the film Magic Moments and later in commercials, TV programs and a few other films.

Perino is mainly active in the voice acting and dubbing industry where, apart from voicing a few Italian animated characters, he has notably dubbed Wood's live action role of Frodo Baggins in The Lord of the Rings trilogy and the majority of the American actor's remaining film roles, Cody Kasch in the role of Zach Young on Desperate Housewives, Kristopher Turner as Jamie Andrews in the series Instant Star, Colin Morgan in Merlin, Ryan Corr in the second season of Blue Water High, where he played Eric Tanner, Aaron Ashmore as Jimmy Olsen in Smallville and Chace Crawford in the role of Nate Archibald in Gossip Girl. He also lent his voice to Lucas Grabeel in the role of Ryan Evans in all the High School Musical films as well as Zachary Garred in the show Foreign Exchange.

In animation, Perino has dubbed Sasori in Naruto Shippuden, Harry Osborn in The Spectacular Spider-Man, Cody in the Total Drama series, and Sylvester the Cat and Wile E. Coyote in the Looney Tunes franchise. In films, he also dubbed Walter in The Muppets and Sam Witwicky in the live-action Transformers trilogy.

In video games, Perino has performed Spyro's Italian voice throughout The Legend of Spyro trilogy, since the original English voice was provided by Elijah Wood.

=== Personal life ===
Perino is the older brother of voice actress Elena Perino. He is also the son of former voice actress Silvia Bellini and the grandson of voice actor Gianfranco Bellini.

== Filmography ==
- Magic Moments (1984) - Dado
- Chiara e gli altri - TV series (1990)
- La luna nel pozzo - TV film (1990)
- Angelo il custode - TV series, 1 episode (2001)
- Don Matteo - TV series, 1 episode (2002) - Fabio Savini's friend
- Natale in India (2003) - Nelson Detassis
- It's Better in Italian - documentary (2015)

== Voice work ==
=== Animation ===
- How the Toys Saved Christmas - Carlo Alberto
- Winx Club - Elas (young)
- Winx Club 3D: Magical Adventure, Winx Club: The Secret of the Lost Kingdom - Timmy
- Gli Smile and Go e il braciere di fuoco - Yors
- Leonardo - Brando
- Teen Days - Elia
- Mini cuccioli - Animated series (2016-2019) - Piero

==== Dubbing roles ====
- Once Upon a Forest - Edgar
- The Little Mermaid II: Return to the Sea - Flounder
- Family Guy - Cleveland Brown Jr., Holden Caulfield, Jeff Campbell, Michael Milano, Elijah Wood, and Neil Goldman (season 10 onwards)
- Stanley - Lionel Griff
- The Fairly OddParents - Chester McBadbat (seasons 1-3, 6-10)
- Baby Looney Tunes - Baby Sylvester
- Kiki's Delivery Service (1st Italian dub) - Tombo
- Kim Possible - Josh Mankey
- Naruto Shippuden - Sasori
- The Simpsons - Dolph Starbeam (season 18 onwards), Steve Fishbein and nerd at the Comicalooza #2 (both in episode 32.7)
- Ultimate Spider-Man - Spider-Man
- Total Drama - Cody
- Spectacular Spider-Man - Harry Osborn
- The Cleveland Show - Cleveland Brown Jr.
- The Muppets, Muppets Most Wanted - Walter
- Sonic the Hedgehog - Sonic the Hedgehog
- The Weekenders - Tino Tonitini
- TMNT - Donatello
- The Wild - Eze
- Valiant - Toughwood
- The Adventures of Tintin - Tintin
- Hotel Transylvania, Hotel Transylvania 2, Hotel Transylvania 3: Summer Vacation - Jonathan
- Big Hero 6 - Wasabi
- Super Robot Monkey Team Hyperforce Go! - Chiro Takashi
- The Replacements - Shelton Klutzberry
- ALVINNN!!! and the Chipmunks - Alvin Seville
- ChalkZone - Reggie Bullnerd
- Wabbit! A Looney Tunes Prod. / New Looney Tunes - Wile E. Coyote
- Bugs Bunny Builders - Wile E. Coyote, Sylvester the Cat
- King Tweety, Looney Tunes Cartoons (seasons 5-6), Tiny Toons Looniversity - Sylvester the Cat

=== Live action ===
==== Dubbing roles ====
- Sam Witwicky in Transformers,Transformers: Revenge of the Fallen, Transformers: Dark of the Moon
- Frodo Baggins in The Lord of the Rings: The Fellowship of the Ring, The Lord of the Rings: The Two Towers, The Lord of the Rings: The Return of the King
- Alex Summers / Havok in X-Men: First Class, X-Men: Days of Future Past, X-Men: Apocalypse
- Ryan Evans in High School Musical, High School Musical 2, High School Musical 3: Senior Year
- Dave Lizewski / Kick-Ass in Kick-Ass, Kick-Ass 2
- Alvin Seville in Alvin and the Chipmunks, Alvin and the Chipmunks: The Squeakquel
- Pavel Chekov in Star Trek, Star Trek Into Darkness, Star Trek Beyond
- Boyd "Bibbia" Swan in Fury
- Willard Young in Paradise
- Nat Cooper in Forever Young
- Mark Evans in The Good Son
- Leo Beiderman in Deep Impact
- Casey Connor in The Faculty
- Patrick in Eternal Sunshine of the Spotless Mind
- William in Bobby
- Loras Tyrell in Game of Thrones
- Mark Zuckerberg in The Social Network
- Charlie Banks in The Education of Charlie Banks
- Columbus in Zombieland
- Daniel Cheston in Solitary Man
- J. Daniel Atlas in Now You See Me
- Lex Luthor in Batman v Superman: Dawn of Justice
- Danny Rand / Iron Fist in Iron Fist
- Will Stronghold in Sky High
- Monty Green in The 100
- Stephen Hawking in The Theory of Everything
- Newt Scamander in Fantastic Beasts and Where to Find Them
- Zach Young in Desperate Housewives
- Evan in Superbad
- Paulie Bleeker in Juno
- Winn Schott in Supergirl
- Silas Botwin in Weeds
- Jack Unger in Underdog
- Eugene Felnich in Grease (2002 redub)
- Rick Riker / Dragonfly in Superhero Movie
- Meeker in Clockstoppers
- Agent Smith in J. Edgar
- Will Mckenzie in The Inbetweeners
- Adam Levi in Schindler's List
- Marco in What to Expect When You're Expecting
- Kevin Miller in Movie 43
- Clay in The Kids Are All Right
- Stuart Twombly in The Internship
- Caleb Holloway in Deepwater Horizon
- Colin Craven in The Secret Garden
- Raymond in Aquamarine
- Jimmy Olsen in Smallville
- Kenny in The Last Kiss
- Danny Francis in Blue Jasmine
- Enea in Troy
- Lip Gallagher in Shameless
- Teen Ethan Montgomery in A Dog's Purpose
- Mason Freeland in Thirteen
- Jimmy Olsen in Superman Returns
- Linus in Fanboys
- Clark in The Master
- Valerian in Valerian and the City of a Thousand Planets
- Robert "Muso" Alexander III in Step Up: All In
- Andrew Neiman in Whiplash
- Nate Archibald in Gossip Girl
- Sebastian Roy in The Office
- The Doctor in Doctor Who
- Evan Peters in American Horror Story (in all the seasons)
