= Veladini =

Printing and publishing family from Lugano

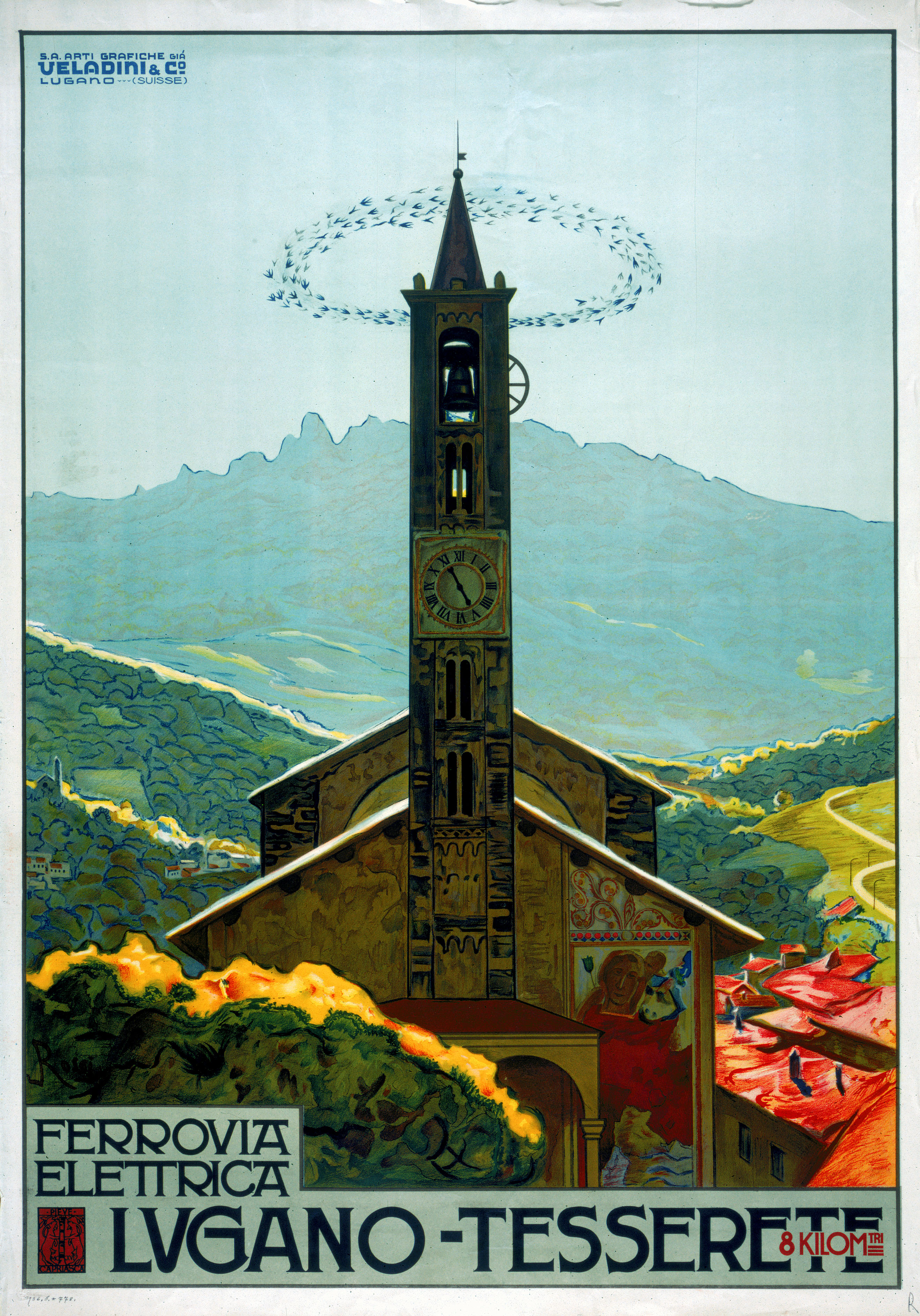

The Veladini family was a family of printers and booksellers from Lugano, originally from Milan. The family operated a prominent printing house in Lugano from the early 19th century through the first quarter of the 20th century.

== History ==
Francesco Veladini (1775–1836), a printer, established himself in Lugano in 1801, where he worked at the Rossi & Co. printing house, which had been opened on behalf of his brother Luigi in 1799. In 1805, Francesco took over the business and renamed it Francesco Veladini & Co. He received citizenship of Lugano in 1816.

The printing house published periodicals, notably the Gazzetta Ticinese, official texts (for which it held a monopoly), and books of various genres. The publications were initially of a liberal tendency, but during the Restoration, they conformed to the conservative ideas of the government.

Upon Francesco's death in 1836, his son Pasquale Veladini took over the family business, adopting an even more cautious editorial line. Following Pasquale, his grandsons Francesco (1841–1924) and Antonio (1847–1902) directed the family enterprise. The business was sold in 1925 and subsequently merged with another printing house. Since 1978, it has operated as Società d'arti grafiche già Veladini & Co. SA.

== Bibliography ==
- Monaldo Leopardi: le edizioni Veladini e la collaborazione al "Cattolico", 1998
- F. Mena, Stamperie ai margini d'Italia, 2003
