= Franko: The Crazy Revenge =

1994 video game

- Developer: World Software
- Publisher: Mirage Software
- Designer: Mariusz Pawluk
- Programmer: Tomasz Tomaszek
- Artist: Mariusz Pawluk
- Composer: Sławomir Mrozek
- Platforms: Amiga, MS-DOS
- Release: Amiga: POL: 1994; MS-DOS: POL: 1996
- Genre: Beat 'em up
- Mode: Single-player

Franko: The Crazy Revenge is a side-scrolling beat 'em up computer game developed by the Polish Szczecin-based studio World Software for the Amiga in 1994 (using AMOS), later ported to MS-DOS compatible operating systems in 1996. It follows the titular Franko causing mayhem on the streets of Szczecin to avenge his fallen friend Alex.

One of the earlier Polish commercially released video games, it also attained quite a notoriety with the amount of violence (being possibly the first violent Polish video game), use of sampled Polish profanity, nudity (with one of the enemy types in the later level being coat flashers) and with how much detail have it portrayed urban Poland in the early 1990s. Gry Online felt the game was Poland's answer to contemporary titles like Double Dragon or Golden Axe. Upon release it was widely hyped within the Polish video game press and has since enjoys a cult following in its country of origin, being praised for atmosphere and the portrayal of the Polish realias despite the technical and artistic ineptitude. A sequel, Skinny & Franko: Fists of Violence was announced in 2018 and released in 2023.

== Gameplay ==
A screenshot from the first level in the Amiga version. Franko (second from left) knee smashes a punk as other enemies surround him from each side.

Franko is a beat 'em up in a vein of Capcom's Final Fight. The player can choose to play either as Franko or Alex (contradicting the plot that implies he's supposed to be murdered) and he traverses through a stage in one direction, beating up everyone that goes in the way until reaching and defeating the stage's boss. Franko consists of three stages - taking each in a different parts of Szczecin - whose low number is compensated for their length when compared to the stages in other beat 'em up games. Interspersed between the stages are the bonus sections that has Franko drive to the next location in a Fiat 126, driving over thugs (and avoiding innocent pedestrians) among the way to gain health and lives. The player starts out with three lives and gains one life stock for each 35th kill during the game as well as performing well in aforementioned bonus sections.

As was common with Amiga games at the time, Franko utilizes an eight-directional joystick and a single fire button whose function changes depending on the direction held. The player can punch, kick, do a jump kick (which some enemy types avoid it by crouching under), a double sided punch that briefly stuns enemies, a spinning kick that knocks down opponents from both sides and a grapple. When catching an enemy with a grapple, the player can then either perform a grab attack or perform a throw, with thrown enemies also acting as projectiles in their own way. With proper positioning the player can also attack downed enemies which is a guaranteed instant kill on most non-boss opponents.

== Plot ==
The game's backstory dates back to 1987 in Szczecin, depicted as a haven for drug dealers at the time. The two teenagers Franko and Alex were practicing martial arts for self-defense and showing off. One night on the streets the friends got ambushed by a gang led by a man named Klocek (pl. block, probably "fecal" with the game's tone). The two fought back but got overwhelmed and were left with Franko barely unconscious and Alex dead. Franko swore revenge and went on to train for years until few years (and one revolution) later he's ready to take on Klocek and his gang all by himself.

The game proper begins somewhere in the early 1990s - with slight hints in the form of references like C+C Music Factory being mentioned on a floor graffiti and one billboard in the third level depicting an advertisement for RoboCop 3. The protagonist - who could be either Franko or Alex despite the latter supposed to be deceased - roams through the streets of Szczecin based on actual locations, starting first at the Rydla street of Osiedle Słoneczne neighbourhood, then going through Independence Alley with the final level being set on the Drzetowo-Grabowo neighbourhood. On his way Franko (or Alex) beats up droves of punks, thugs, karatekas, police officers, ZOMO troops, a software pirate (being the boss of the second stage), exhibitionists and others before finally getting on Klocek. After weakening Klocek, the drug boss wants to get some rest but he ends up breaking the railing behind him and falls onto the train tracks.

== Development ==
Franko began development in 1992 and was more or less complete later that year, with the developers giving the game polish in meantime while they were seeking publishers that would work with them, with the game eventually getting picked up by Mirage Media. It would've been one of the first commercially released Polish games for the Amiga had it be released two years earlier. Mariusz Pawluk, the artist and the primary idea originator for the game is a big enthusiast for the Beat 'em up genre of video games and wanted to create a worthy one for the Commodore Amiga after being disappointed with the poorly received home ports of contemporary beat 'em ups on the platform.

The developers had a much bigger scope for the project to the point of stating that the game if came out as originally planned would have been released on twelve floppy disks, with the amount of content that had to be cut at the planning stage. The programmer also had to work around the limitations (especially the memory-related ones) of the hardware and the artist's ambitions. The game was supposed to also have a two-player co-operative mode, but it was omitted as the programmer "had enough constantly rewriting the code".

One of the artist's ambitions that proved to be taxing for the hardware was his insistence on not using tile-based rendering for stages, instead opting to create the stage backgrounds in one single large image that was loaded in chunks to make the stage look unique throughout its length. This had the side effect of contributing to the game's constant load times. The compression algorithm used for the stage graphics is also the source for the game's "choppy" scrolling.

Franko's publisher Mirage Software have mandated a few obscene scenes to be cut from the game, including a background animation during the first boss fight. However, World Software were able to sneak in the exhibitionist enemies as well as the sequence of defeating the first boss, which has Franko urinate on the opponent. The scene was about to be cut, however the programmer has implemented a cheat code to re-enable the sequence, and the developers have submitted the game for release with the cheat code enabled by default.

The DOS version was developed and released for 1996, with the separate developer handling the port. As World Software themselves did not have internet connections at the time, their input on the DOS port was limited to sharing few tips and sending assets on disc through mail to the developer of the port who lived far away from them.

The original title was Franio - reflecting the developer's attitude towards their project at the time - however this was mutated to "Franko" in order to sound less juvenile.

== Reception ==
The game's release in Poland has garnered quite a lot of hype by the virtue of being one of the earliest commercial Amiga games developed in Poland, and the game's setting in Szczecin have further bolstered the game's appeal. Despite the amateurish graphics and the technical issues – most notably the constant and lengthy load times – the Amiga game was widely acclaimed within the Polish video game press, with Secret Service magazine awarding it a near perfect score and Top Secret even declaring it 1994 16-bit Game of the Year. The game was a commercial hit in Poland – even though the success did not resonate with the publisher – and to this day enjoys a cult following in Poland.

The DOS version had a more lukewarm reception, with Secret Service especially panning that version in a later issue. While the DOS version boasts improved graphics and next-to-nonexistent load times, the redrawn backgrounds were a point of contention among players familiar with the Amiga original, feeling the sparsity of the backgrounds made the game lose its charm. The developers of the Amiga game were also critical on the PC port.

== Legacy ==
World Software followed Franko up with a spiritual sequel titled Doman: Grzechy Ardana, released for the Amiga in 1995. A more serious affair (but just as violent if not even moreso), Doman adopted a fantasy theme inspired by Conan The Barbarian and expanded upon the framework of Franko by introducing a two-player co-operation mode and giving players an ability to wield different weapons, as well as introducing enemies with actual ranged attacks. The references to Doman in Franko (like the title being written in one stage, as well as one cheat code for additional lives) hints the former was already in development by the time of the latter's release.

There were a few attempts to develop a direct sequel to Franko. Franko 2 was to be initially developed for the Amiga, but Mirage Software's lack of interest in releasing violent video games coupled with the fading viability of the Amiga as a commercial platform caused the project to be cancelled. Mirage Software would later gauge their interest in developing a new installment for the IBM PC, but nothing much came out after that. Then in 2003 Franko 2: No Mercy was in development for the Game Boy Advance with Mariusz Pawluk reprising as an artist and director, but that project was also canceled, with Pawluk putting the blame on Nintendo's policies regarding violent video games.

In June 2013, a crowdfunding campaign was announced for Franko 2: Revenge is Back, which started in 2014 and had Mariusz Pawluk once again working on as an artist. The funding goal was 34,500 PLN (with the campaign ending with 112% of the goal attained) and the game would've been targeted to PC and mobile platforms. Ever since the crowdfunding campaign, the sequel - which used to be known as Franko 2: Emigrant Blood - went through a slow development mostly stemming from the small development staff working on the game in their spare time. Eventually in late 2018 development (and rights to the IP) was overtaken by the Gdańsk-based studio Blue Sunset Games, who kept Pawluk's involvement as well as his graphical assets but otherwise restarted the project. Skinny & Franko: Fists of Violence had a gameplay demo displayed at a Pyrkon show in 2019 and was slated for release in 2020, finally launching on Steam on April 28, 2023, with the developers also targeting consoles in addition to PC.

== See also ==
- Abobo's Big Adventure
- Tecmo Knight
