= Di Franco =

Di Franco (also spelled DiFranco) or DeFranco is a surname. Notable people with the surname include:

== Di Franco ==
- Ani DiFranco (born 1970), American-Canadian singer-songwriter
- Debbie DiFranco, American politician
- Doug DiFranco, American hip hop producer from the duo Double Dee and Steinski
- Francisco Di Franco (born 1995), Argentine professional footballer
- Gianluigi Di Franco (1953–2005), Italian singer
- Giovanni Cola di Franco (fl. early 1600), Italian Mannerist architect
- Loretta Di Franco (1942–2024), American operatic soprano
- Luigi Di Franco (1918–?), Italian footballer

== DeFranco ==
- Buddy DeFranco (1923–2014), American jazz clarinetist
- Philip DeFranco (born 1985), American YouTube personality
- The DeFranco Family, Canadian 1970s pop music group

== See also ==
- Loreto de Franchis (1578–1638), Italian Catholic prelate
- Franco (disambiguation)
