= Antonio Veladini =

Swiss printer and politician

- Born: 10 April 1817; Lugano, Switzerland
- Died: 6 July 1890 (aged 73); Lugano, Switzerland
- Occupations: Printer, lithographer
- Known for: Printing business, public service
- Spouse: Demetria Foletti (m. 1845)
- Parent(s): Francesco Veladini (father); Francesca Guioni (mother)
- Relatives: Pasquale Veladini (brother); Giovanni Antonio Veladini (brother)

Antonio Veladini (10 April 1817 – 6 July 1890) was a Swiss printer, lithographer, and politician from Lugano in the canton of Ticino.

== Early life and education ==
Veladini was born on 10 April 1817 in Lugano, the son of Francesco Veladini, a printer, and Francesca Guioni. He was Catholic and a citizen of Lugano. He attended the Collège Saint-Antoine in Lugano and the institute of Alberto Lamoni in Muzzano, before completing an apprenticeship as a typographer in Zurich. In 1845, he married Demetria Foletti.

== Career ==
=== Printing business ===
From 1836 to 1840, Veladini worked as an associate in his father's printing business (Veladini) alongside his brothers Pasquale and Giovanni Antonio. In 1843, he opened a small lithography workshop in Lugano.

=== Public service ===
Veladini served as a municipal councillor in Lugano and acted as deputy to his brother Giovanni Antonio in the latter's role as prefect. For many years, he held the position of keeper of the mortgage registry (conservatore delle ipoteche), but was dismissed by the conservative government in 1877. He also worked as an agent for the Ticino Cantonal Bank.

=== Other activities ===
Veladini was a member of the Demopedeutica (Society for Popular Education) from 1860 onwards. As an artillery officer, he participated in the Sonderbund War in 1847.

== Bibliography ==
- L'Educatore della Svizzera italiana, 1890, pp. 223–224
