= Skinny & Franko: Fists of Violence =

- Developer: Blue Sunset Games
- Publisher: Console Labs S.A.
- Platforms: Windows, Nintendo Switch
- Release: April 28, 2023
- Genre: Action-adventure
- Modes: Single-player, Multiplayer

Skinny & Franko: Fists of Violence is an action-adventure video game developed by Blue Sunset Games and published by Console Labs S.A. It is a sequel to Franko: The Crazy Revenge.

The game was released on April 28, 2023.

== Development ==
The sequel to Franko: The Crazy Revenge was originally worked on from 1995 to 1996, then the development team broke up. In 2002/2003, there was an attempt to create Franko 2: No Mercy for the Game Boy Advance - the project was abandoned once Nintendo rejected the violent elements of the video game. Later in June 2013, Franko 2: Revenge is Back was announced.

In January 2014, the game's developers, Tomasz Tomaszek and Mariusz Pawluk from World Software, had a crowdfunding campaign on Wspieram.to create a sequel to Franko: The Crazy Revenge. It was announced that IMGN.pro would be the game's publisher. The team reached their goal of PLN 34.5 thousand, a record-breaking amount for Polish crowdfunding. The developers said that at the time they began the crowdfund, mechanics of the game were already 70% built, while other elements (maps, graphics, cutscenes, dialogues) were 20 - 30% completed.

In late 2014, it was announced that the game's main programmer had left the project, leading to a search for a development team who could complete the game.

Graczpospolita reported that by 2015, communication between developers and the fans had "completely gone down". Gry Online declared that it was considered by many to be a "dead game".

In terms of gameplay, they announced a decision regarding the use of firearms in the title:

"For some time we have been thinking about whether to throw firearms into the game. [...] Franko is first and foremost a fist fight and that is what her substance, mechanics, gameplay and sense are, which means that the introduction of firearms could disturb the atmosphere of potential "realism". We didn't want to make a spectacular fighting game, but a "mundane" fighting game. Therefore, introducing a firearm in the wrong way could upset the balance. [...] So we decided to finally implement the firearms ourselves. However, we can promise that it will be very little in the game and it will depend on the player whether to use it at all."

— Developers to Graczpospolita, 2016,

In 2016, the development team wrote a message to their fans, "We work, we work. [...] in the meantime, be patient as you have not done so...", before explaining the challenges they've faces in the process. They further added that the core development is done by one person with a few other part-timers and freelancers. In 2017 it was announced that after 5 years of development of the game, they'd like to release the first part for the 25th anniversary of the original - in 2019.

Pawluk said the game "has been scrapped, because despite the passage of several years the developers could not provide the quality that the original creators and fans would be satisfied with. Bah, as I found out, there wasn't even a developed combat system despite several years of work".

In 2018, the rights were acquired by the Gdańsk-based studio Blue Sunset Games, and the game was since rebranded as Skinny & Franko: Fists of Violence with the development beginning from scratch.
