= Ugolino Brunforte =

Italian Friar Minor and chronicler

Ugolino Brunforte (c. 1262 – c. 1348) was an Italian Friar Minor and chronicler, known principally as the author of the Fioretti or Little Flowers of St. Francis.

== Life ==
Few details of Ugolino's life are known. His father Rinaldo, Lord of Sarnano in the Marches, belonged to an ancient and noble family from which had sprung the famous Countess Matilda of Tuscany. Ugolino entered the Order of Friars Minor at the age of sixteen. He served his novitiate at the convent of Roccabruna, but passed most of his life at the convent of Santa Maria in Monte Giorgio, whence he is often called Ugolino of Monte Giorgio. In 1295 he was chosen Bishop of Abruzzi (Teramo) under Pope Celestine V, but before his consecration Celestine had resigned and Boniface VIII, who suspected Ugolino as belonging to the zelanti, annulled the appointment with the bull In supremae dignitatis specula. Nearly fifty years later he was elected provincial of Macerata. At the time of his death in 1348, was provincial of the Friars Minor in the March.

== Fioretti ==
Most scholars are now agreed that Ugolino was the author of the Fioretti, or Little Flowers of St. Francis, in their original form. Ugolino was probably one of several collectors of traditions in the Marches. The Fioretti appears to have been written sometime between 1322 and 1328.

In some ways the Fioretti says as much about its author as its subject. "Ugolino, it is true, draws himself when he draws his master. It is a singularly, fresh, simple, child-like character with its unfailing belief in the love of God, and the essential goodness of all he has created."

Filled with the romance of his native country, the simple friar, so pure in his insight, and so vivid in his realization, painted an immortal picture of the Saintly life as it was lived in the Middle Ages, on the background of the enchanted country between the Apennines and the Adriatic, the land of Monte Giorgio, the heart of Italy.

Although the Latin original has not come down to us, we have in the Actus B. Francisci et Sociorum Ejus, edited by Paul Sabatier in Collection d’Études (Paris, 1902, IV), an approximation to it which may be considered on the whole as representing the original of the Fioretti. That Ugolino was the principal compiler of the Actus seems certain; how far he may be considered the sole author of the Fioretti is not so clear. His labour, which consisted chiefly in gathering the flowers for his bouquet from written and oral local tradition, appears to have been completed before 1328.

== Sources ==
- Luke Wadding, Scriptores Ordinis Minorum (1650), 179
- Giovanni Sbaralea, Supplementum et castigatio ad scriptores trium ordinum S. Francisi (1806), addenda 727
- Luigi da Fabriano, Disquisizione istorica intorno all' autore dei Fioretti (1883)
- Cenni cronologico-biografici dell' osservante Provincia Picena (Quaracchi, 1886), 232 sqq.
- Alessandro Manzoni, Fioretti (2nd ed., Rome, 1902), preface
- Candido Mariotti, I Primordi Gloriosi dell' ordine Minoritico nelle Marche (Castelplanio, 1903), VI
- Thomas Walker Arnold, The Authorship of the Fioretti (London, 1904)
- Camillo Pace, L'autore del Floretum in Rivista Abruzzese, ann. XIX, fasc. II
- François Van Ortroy, in Analecta Bollandiana, XXI, 443 sqq.
