= Mariana Franko =

Central figure in court case

Mariana Franko (28 July 1718 - 9 September, 1795) was a Dutch free person of color who was involved in a decades long court case in Curaçao and the Dutch Republic. Frank was born a slave, but was freed in 1725. She received an education and worked at a plantation. In 1758, she and her partner were accused of stealing goods and both were banished from the island. She continued the case in the mainland until her conviction was overturned in 1772, and received compensation in 1777.

== Early life ==
Mariana Franko was born in Sint Eustatius, on 28 July 1718, to N.N. and Christina. She was born into slavery, but was freed on 1 August 1725. She was a member of the Dutch Reformed Church, an oddity the Protestant community in Curaçao was almost entirely white. Franko learned how to read and write.

Franko started working at the plantation Zorgvliet in 1752, and lived with her partner Pedro Anthonij, a slave who was also a foreman. She supervised child slaves and administered livestock transfers and earnings from products sold by slaves.

== Court case ==
Anthonij was arrested in 1758, after being accused by Zorgvliet's owner of stealing goods. Franko was also imprisoned as an accomplice. They were both interrogated and Anthonij initially confessed, but retracted his confession. Anthonij was sentenced to be flogged and banished after statements were gathered from several white people and slaves.

Franko did not confess to the charges against her and wrote to Mozes Levij Maduro, her former lover, for help. The white overseer at Zorgvliet provided an exculpatory statement as he was the only person with keys to the storehouse. There was lack of evidence against her or presence of any money from the stolen goods, but the court argued that Franko sent the money to a white man in St. Eustatius who she wanted to marry. After two years of imprisonment Mariana was sentenced to eternal banishment and sent to the Colony of Jamaica on 28 November 1760. All of her belongings were seized and sold at a public auction.

Franko travelled to the mainland Dutch Republic and arrived by 1764. She initially lived in Amsterdam before moving to The Hague. In The Hague she found a solicitor who would present her case. On 9 December 1767, the States-General ordered a review of the case. She intended to file a defamation lawsuit, demand the return of her belongings, and receive compensation with interest. The States-General overturned the Curaçao Council's verdict in 1772, and Franko was given compensation in 1777. However, this was seized and given to Franko's creditors.

For a long time, it was unclear what became of Franko after the ruling. Documents found in the archives of Amsterdam and The Hague indicate that in 1779 her creditors believed she had returned to Curacao. However, she died in The Hague on September 9, 1795.

== Works cited ==
=== Journals ===
- Jordaan, Han (2010). "Free Blacks and Coloreds and the Administration of Justice in Eighteenth-Century Curaçao". New West Indian Guide. 84 (1). Brill Publishers: 63–86. JSTOR 41850553.

=== Web ===
- "Franko, Mariana (1718-na 1777)". Huygens Institute for the History of the Netherlands. Archived from the original on 12 July 2025.
