= Mózgprocesor =

1989 video game

- Developer: Computer Adventure Studio
- Publisher: Computer Adventure Studio
- Platforms: ZX Spectrum, Atari 8-bit
- Release: 1989
- Genre: Adventure
- Mode: Single-player

Mózgprocesor (Brain Processor) is a Polish video game published in 1989 by Computer Adventure Studio for ZX Spectrum and in 1990 for the Atari 8-bit computers. It was Computer Adventure Studio's first and last game. It was created by Piotr Kucharski, Krzysztof Piwowarski and Wiesław Florek, a team of high school students from Bochnia. The team had previously created Smok Wawelski in 1987, developed in six weeks out of a script created within an hour.

Reviews of "Mózgprocesor" were featured in Bajtek 10/1989 and Top Secret 3/1991, Top Secret 2/1990 also included an interview with developer Piotr Kucharski, which at the time was unprecedented for a Polish game.

Despite the title's massive popularity in Poland, the game was readily pirated which significantly eroded the profits of the young development company and prevented it from releasing a second title. According to Techsty, it is the most discussed and most developed of all the Polish text-based adventure games. Gadzetomania thought the title was probably the first, Polish game published in a professional way. Logo24 deemed it the first Polish game that did not differ significantly from global standards.
