= Vasili Franco =

German politician

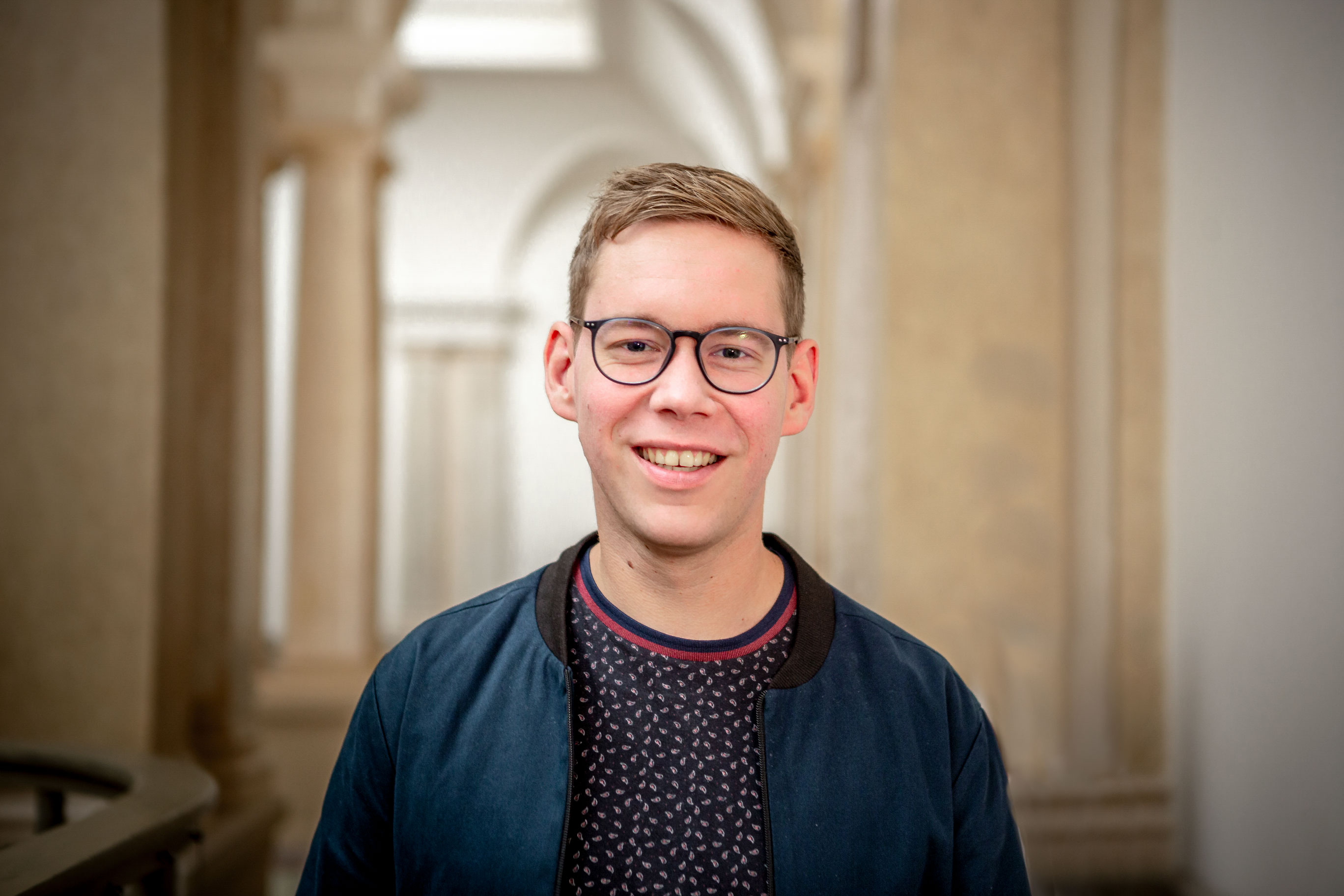

Member of the Abgeordnetenhaus of Berlin
- Constituency: Friedrichshain-Kreuzberg 5

Personal details
- Born: 8 June 1992 (age 33) St Petersburg, Russia
- Party: Alliance 90/The Greens
- Occupation: Politician

Vasili Franco (born 8 July 1992) is a German politician currently serving as Member of the Abgeordnetenhaus of Berlin representing Friedrichshain-Kreuzberg 5 for Alliance 90/The Greens.

== Personal life and education ==
Franco was born in Saint Petersburg, Russia and migrated to Germany with his family as a child.

== Career ==
Franco is the Green group spokesperson for drug policy and domestic policy.
