= Franco Sosa (footballer, born 1995) =

Argentine footballer

Personal information
- Full name: Franco Tomás Sosa
- Date of birth: 19 September 1995 (age 31)
- Height: 1.80 m (5 ft 11 in)
- Position: Forward

Team information
- Current team: Virtus Francavilla

Senior career*
Years	Team	Apps	(Gls)
2014–2015	Defensores de Belgrano	1	(0)
2016–2017	Aldosivi	0	(0)
2017–2018	Fénix	4	(0)
2019–2020	Anagni	21	(3)
2020–2021	Ariano		
2021	Agnonese	9	(3)
2021	Sorrento	8	(0)
2021–2022	Fasano	29	(6)
2022–2023	Altamura	33	(12)
2023–2024	Cerignola	20	(0)
2024	→ Monopoli (loan)	11	(1)
2024–	Virtus Francavilla	0	(0)
- * Club domestic league appearances and goals as of 5 May 2024

Franco Tomás Sosa (born 9 September 1995) is an Argentine footballer who plays as a forward for Italian Serie D club Brindisi FC

== Career ==
On 17 January 2024, Sosa joined Serie C club Monopoli on loan with an obligation to buy.

On 24 July 2024, Sosa signed with Virtus Francavilla.

== Career statistics ==
As of 29 May 2020

Club	Season	League			Cup		Continental		Other		Total	
Club	Season	Division	Apps	Goals	Apps	Goals	Apps	Goals	Apps	Goals	Apps	Goals
Defensores de Belgrano	2013–14	Primera B Metropolitana	1	0	1 (Note: Appearances in the Copa Argentina)	0	–		0	0	2	0
Aldosivi	2016	Argentine Primera División	0	0	0	0	–		0	0	0	0
Aldosivi	2016–17	Argentine Primera División	0	0	0	0	–		0	0	0	0
Aldosivi	Total		0	0	0	0	0	0	0	0	0	0
Fénix	2016–17	Primera B Metropolitana	4	0	0	0	–		0	0	4	0
Fénix	2017–18	Primera B Metropolitana	0	0	0	0	–		0	0	0	0
Fénix	Total		4	0	0	0	0	0	0	0	4	0
Anagni	2019–20	Serie D	21	3	0	0	–		0	0	21	3
Career total			26	3	1	0	0	0	0	0	27	3
