= Franco Ferrari (footballer, born 1987) =

Peruvian footballer

Personal information
- Full name: Franco Pierre Ferrari Martínez
- Date of birth: 23 April 1987 (age 39)
- Place of birth: Peru
- Position: Midfielder

Senior career*
Years	Team	Apps	(Gls)
2003	Coronel Bolognesi	1	(0)
2006	José Gálvez	1	(0)
2011	Universidad San Marcos	6	(0)
- * Club domestic league appearances and goals

Franco Pierre Ferrari Martínez (born 23 April 1987) is a Peruvian footballer who plays as a midfielder. He is currently a free agent.

== Career ==
Ferrari played for Coronel Bolognesi in the 2003 Torneo Descentralizado, making one appearance in the Peruvian top-flight. In 2006, the midfielder again featured just once in the Peruvian Primera División, this time for José Gálvez who were eventually relegated to the Peruvian Segunda División; a league Ferrari featured in for Universidad San Marcos in 2011, being selected six times.

== Career statistics ==
As of 10 December 2018.

Club statistics
Club	Season	League			Cup (Note: Includes the Torneo del Inca)		League Cup		Continental		Other		Total	
Club	Season	Division	Apps	Goals	Apps	Goals	Apps	Goals	Apps	Goals	Apps	Goals	Apps	Goals
Coronel Bolognesi	2003	Primera División	1	0	—		—		—		0	0	1	0
José Gálvez	2006	Primera División	1	0	—		—		—		0	0	1	0
Universidad San Marcos	2011	Segunda División	6	0	0	0	—		—		0	0	6	0
Career total			8	0	0	0	—		—		0	0	8	0
