= Franko Uzelac =

Croatian footballer

Personal information
- Date of birth: 5 November 1994 (age 32)
- Place of birth: Ahlen, Germany
- Height: 1.90 m (6 ft 3 in)
- Position: Centre back

Team information
- Current team: Sportfreunde Lotte
- Number: 5

Youth career
- SV Emstek
- Werder Bremen
- –2009: VfL Osnabrück
- 2009–2013: VfB Oldenburg

Senior career*
Years	Team	Apps	(Gls)
2013–2016	VfB Oldenburg	95	(5)
2016–2018	Würzburger Kickers II	10	(2)
2016–2018	Würzburger Kickers	7	(0)
2018–2019	SV Babelsberg	29	(2)
2019–2020	Fortuna Köln	37	(6)
2021–2024	Alemannia Aachen	82	(7)
2024–2025	MSV Duisburg	5	(0)
2024–	Sportfreunde Lotte	11	(1)

International career
2014	Croatia U20	1	(0)
- * Club domestic league appearances and goals as of 12 October 2025

Franko Uzelac (born 5 November 1994) is a footballer who plays as a centre back for Sportfreunde Lotte. Born in Germany, he has represented Croatia at youth level.

== Career ==
In July 2017 Uzelac moved to Regionalliga Nord side SV Babelsberg from 3. Liga club Würzburger Kickers. After several years in the fourth tier after that, he moved to MSV Duisburg of the Regionalliga West for the 2024–25 season. After one year in Duisburg he signed with Sportfreunde Lotte.

== Career statistics ==
As of 14 March 2025

Appearances and goals by club, season and competition
Club	Season	Division	League		Cup		Total	
Club	Season	Division	Apps	Goals	Apps	Goals	Apps	Goals
VfB Oldenburg	2012–13	Regionalliga Nord	2	0	—		2	0
VfB Oldenburg	2013–14	Regionalliga Nord	25	1	—		25	1
VfB Oldenburg	2014–15	Regionalliga Nord	34	2	—		34	2
VfB Oldenburg	2015–16	Regionalliga Nord	34	2	—		34	2
VfB Oldenburg	Total		95	5	—		95	5
Würzburger Kickers II	2016–17	Bayernliga	7	2	—		7	2
Würzburger Kickers II	2017–18	Bayernliga	3	0	—		3	0
Würzburger Kickers II	Total		10	2	—		10	2
Würzburger Kickers	2016–17	2. Bundesliga	1	0	—		1	0
Würzburger Kickers	2017–18	3. Liga	6	0	—		6	0
Würzburger Kickers	Total		7	0	—		7	0
SV Babelsberg	2018–19	Regionalliga Nordost	29	2	—		29	2
Fortuna Köln	2019–20	Regionalliga West	19	4	—		19	4
Fortuna Köln	2020–21	Regionalliga West	18	2	—		18	2
Fortuna Köln	Total		37	6	—		37	6
Alemannia Aachen	2020–21	Regionalliga West	2	0	—		2	0
Alemannia Aachen	2021–22	Regionalliga West	26	4	—		26	4
Alemannia Aachen	2022–23	Regionalliga West	29	3	—		29	3
Alemannia Aachen	2023–24	Regionalliga West	25	0	—		26	0
Alemannia Aachen	Total		82	7	—		82	7
MSV Duisburg	2024–25	Regionalliga West	5	0	—		5	0
Career total			265	24	2	0	265	24
