= Gianfranco Lotti =

Gianfranco Lotti Retail
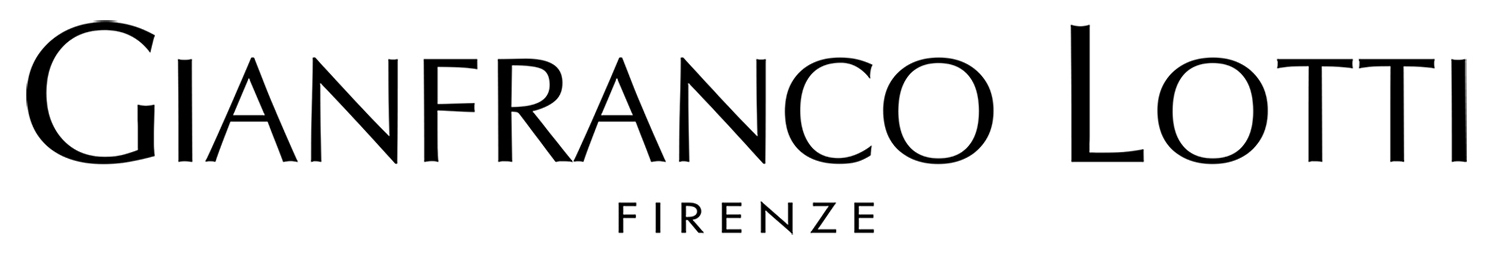
- Industry: Luxury leather goods
- Founded: Florence, Tuscany, Italy 1968; 58 years ago
- Founder: Gianfranco Lotti
- Headquarters: Via di Porto 35, Scandicci, Florence, Italy
- Number of locations: 5 boutiques
- Areas served: Florence, Milan, Dubai, Seoul, Chongqing
- Key people: Gianfranco Lotti (founder and board member)
- Products: Handbag; Jewellery; Ready-to-wear; Accessories
- Number of employees: 130 (2016)
- Website: www.gianfrancolotti.com

Gianfranco Lotti is a designer leather handbag company based in Florence, Italy. Its founder and owner is Gianfranco Lotti.

== History ==
Gianfranco Lotti opened his first workshop in Florence in 1968, after a long apprenticeship. Lotti opened his first boutique in Via de' Tornabuoni, in the historic center of Florence.

In 2013, the original parent company of Gianfranco Lotti, Bottega Manifatturiera Borse SpA, was purchased by the German fund, Halder, with Franco Lucà as the new CEO. Lotti was named as the technical advisor to Gianfranco Lotti Retail S.R.L. In addition to the Florence boutique, single-brand stores were opened in Rue Saint-Honoré, Paris and Chongqing in China. There is also a single-brand boutique on Via Monte Napoleone, Milan.
