= Gianfranco Bellini =

Italian voice actor (1924–2006)

- Born: 10 July 1924; Palermo, Italy
- Died: 9 August 2006 (aged 82); Rome, Italy
- Other name: Gianfranco Zanchi
- Occupations: Actor; voice actor
- Years active: 1936–2006
- Children: Silvia Bellini
- Parents: Nino Bellini (father); Celeste Aida Zanchi (mother)
- Relatives: Davide Perino (grandson); Elena Perino (granddaughter)

Gianfranco Bellini (10 July 1924 – 9 August 2006) was an Italian actor and voice actor.

== Biography ==
Born in Palermo to actor parents, Bellini made his film debut at age 12 alongside his mother in the 1936 film The Two Sergeants. The following year, Bellini starred in Mario Camerini's Il signor Max. He was credited under his mother's maiden name. In 1948, Bellini sought a career in voice dubbing. His first ever Italian dubbing role was in Bambi in which he voiced the title character as an adolescent.

Bellini's career as a voice actor skyrocketed during the 1950s and 1960s. Through the years, he provided voice acting work for films directed by Roberto Rossellini, Bruno Bozzetto, Giuliano Cenci, Gibba and Guido Manuli. His most famous Italian dubbing roles included John Bosley (portrayed by David Doyle) in Charlie's Angels and HAL 9000 in the 1968 film 2001: A Space Odyssey. Bellini was the official Italian voice of Donald O'Connor and he also dubbed James Tolkan and Elisha Cook Jr. in some of their films. In his animated roles, Bellini performed the Italian voices of Roger Radcliffe in One Hundred and One Dalmatians, Nutsy in Robin Hood and a Fox in Mary Poppins.

=== Personal life ===
Bellini's daughter Silvia previously worked as a voice actress. He was also the maternal grandfather of voice actors Davide and Elena Perino.

== Death ==
Bellini died after a long illness in Rome on 9 August 2006 at the age of 82.

== Filmography ==
=== Cinema ===
- Think It Over Jack (1936)
- The Two Sergeants (1936)
- Il signor Max (1937) - Credited as "Gianfranco Zanchi"
- The Flowers of St. Francis (1950)
- Allonsanfàn (1974)

=== Television ===
- Qui squadra mobile - TV series, episode 1.5 (1973)
- Gamma - TV miniseries (1975)

== Voice work ==
- Narrator in The Flowers of St. Francis
- The Bearded Undertaker in West and Soda
- The Pigeon in The Adventures of Pinocchio
- Circus Owner in Il nano e la strega
- Piemonte in L'eroe dei due mondi

=== Dubbing roles ===
==== Animation ====
- Adult Bambi in Bambi
- Roger Radcliffe in One Hundred and One Dalmatians
- Nutsy in Robin Hood
- Br'er Fox in Song of the South
- Fox in Mary Poppins
- Bookseller in Beauty and the Beast

==== Live action ====
- Jefferson Yorke in Rio Grande
- HAL 9000 in 2001: A Space Odyssey
- Dr. Noah / Jimmy Bond in Casino Royale
- John Bosley in Charlie's Angels
- Peter Stirling in Francis the Talking Mule
- Mr. Strickland in Back to the Future
- Sheriff Strickland in Back to the Future Part III
- Marvin Acme in Who Framed Roger Rabbit
- Charlie Bassett in Gunfight at the O.K. Corral
- Hans Beckert in M
- Abu in The Thief of Bagdad
- Jonathan Forbes in Pillow Talk
