= Carolina Franco =

American statistician

Carolina Franco is a principal statistician at NORC at the University of Chicago, with expertise in survey methodology, complex surveys, and small area estimation.

== Education and career ==
Franco has a bachelor's degree, master's degree, and Ph.D., all from the University of Maryland, College Park. Her 2012 doctoral dissertation, Selected Problems in Multi-Sample Statistical Inference, was supervised by Abram M. Kagan.

She worked in the United States Census Bureau for approximately ten years, becoming head of the Small Area Estimation Group in the Center for Statistical Research and Methodology, before moving to NORC.

== Recognition ==
Franco became an Elected Member of the International Statistical Institute in 2023. She was elected as a Fellow of the American Statistical Association in 2026.
