= Barcelos, Vila Boa e Vila Frescainha (São Martinho e São Pedro) =

- Civil parish
- Location in Portugal
- Coordinates: 41.535°N 8.615°W
- Country: Portugal
- Region: Norte
- Intermunic. comm.: Cávado
- District: Braga
- Municipality: Barcelos

Area
  - Total: 9.30 km^{2} (3.59 sq mi)

Population (2011)
  - Total: 11,108
  - Density: 1,190/km^{2} (3,090/sq mi)
- Time zone: UTC+00:00 (WET)
  - Summer (DST): UTC+01:00 (WEST)

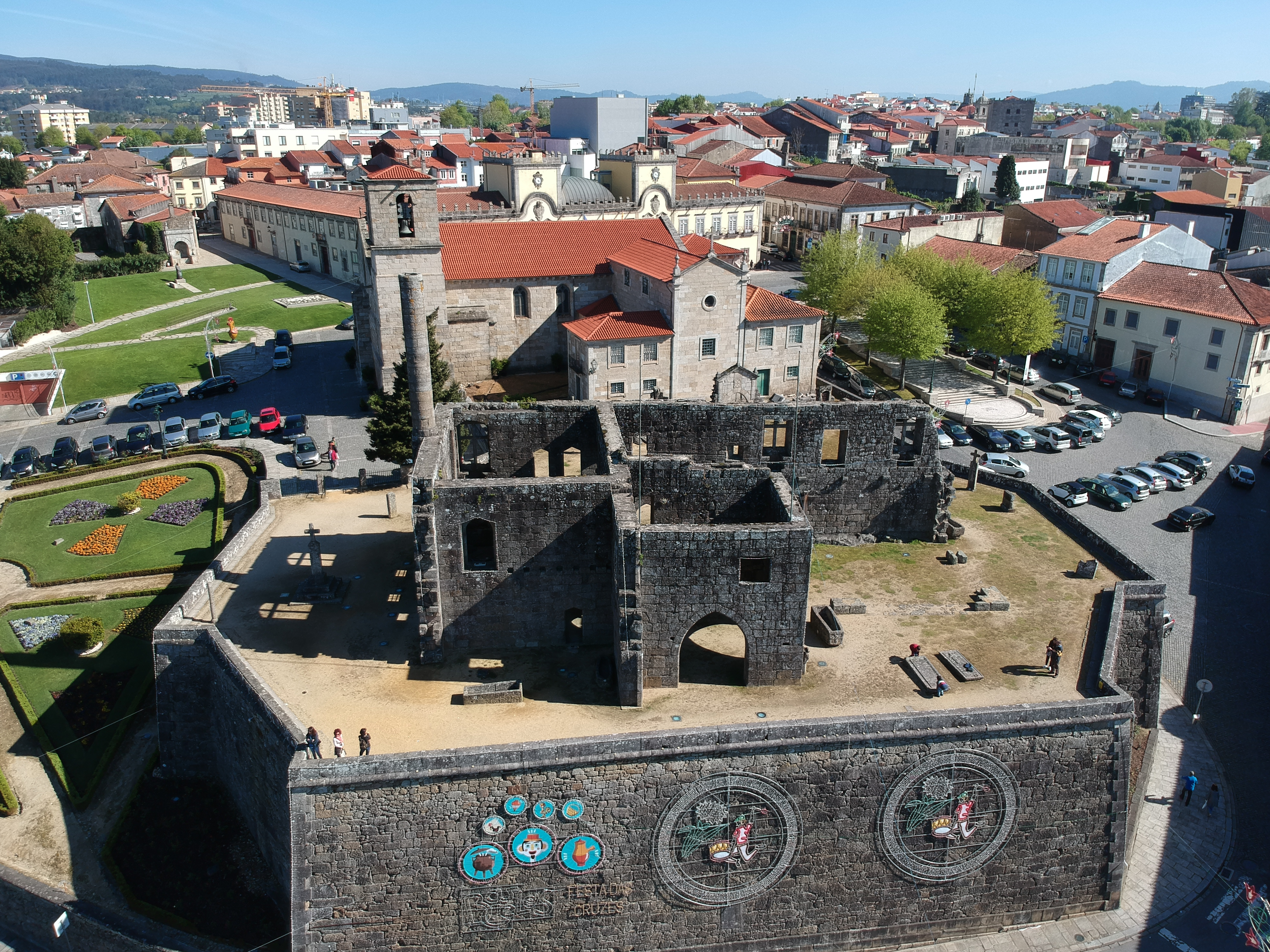
Aerial photograph of Barcelos Portugal

Barcelos, Vila Boa e Vila Frescainha (São Martinho e São Pedro) is a civil parish in the municipality of Barcelos, Portugal. It was formed in 2013 by the merger of the former parishes Barcelos, Vila Boa, Vila Frescainha (São Martinho) and Vila Frescainha (São Pedro). The population in 2011 was 11,108, in an area of 9.30 km^{2} (3.59 sq mi).
