= Tecmo Knight =

1989 video game

- North American arcade flyer
- Developer: Tecmo
- Publisher: Tecmo
- Director: H. Iijima
- Composers: Mikio Saito; Mayuko Okamura
- Platform: Arcade
- Release: NA: May 1989; JP: July 1989
- Genre: Beat 'em up
- Modes: Single-player, multiplayer

Tecmo Knight, known in Japan as Wild Fang (Note: Japanese: ワイルドファング, Hepburn: Wairudo Fangu), is a 1989 beat 'em up video game developed and published by Tecmo for arcades. It was released in North America in May 1989 and Japan in July 1989. Hamster Corporation released the game as part of their Arcade Archives series for the Nintendo Switch and PlayStation 4 in May 2023.

== Gameplay ==
The player takes the role of Tecmo Knight, and may switch between different mounts with varying abilities. The tiger (pictured) grants Tecmo greater attack range.

The protagonist Tecmo Knight has the assistance of "Smokeman" and "Tiger". Pressing the "change" button allows Tecmo Knight to switch between the two. Smokeman uses powerful punches and kicks against enemies when Tecmo Knight rides him. While riding the tiger, Tecmo Knight has the use of a spiked ball and chain which is less powerful than Smokeman's attacks, but has greater range. When slain, a foe's head will break from the rest of the body and may leave behind a bonus item in the form of its skull. When collecting the special dragon skull that randomly appears after defeating an enemy, the Tecmo Knight will summon the most powerful creature to ride on: the Flying Dragon. Tecmo Knight is immune to attack while riding the Flying Dragon, whose breath kills any monster instantly, including the stage-end bosses. Using the "Access Attack" maneuver, Tecmo Knight can use Smokeman or the tiger to jump onto enemies and pummel them.

Sometimes, if Tecmo Knight runs low on life, a blow by a weak monster will kill only Smokeman or the tiger, leaving Tecmo Knight to fend for himself with a very frail short-ranged attack. It is extremely hard for him to survive at this point. All bosses in the game appear in "pairs", making it harder for a single player to corner them. The only exception is the last boss Deglomes. Currently, there are two "extra life" bonus skulls known to exist in the game. Players can also utilize "props" like bombs and stone-rollers placed around the map to their advantage.

Much like the 1988 arcade beat 'em up Ninja Gaiden, Tecmo Knight is hard for beginners, because it requires more patience than button-mashing. Like Ninja Gaiden, the game features a rather disturbing continue screen, where Tecmo Knight is about to be swallowed by an unseen monster. If the player does not continue before the 10 second countdown ends, Tecmo Knight is heard screaming as the monster swallows him. Afterwards, the screen will black out, and a monster will tear through it shouting "NO FUTURE!", along with "Game Over" appearing under the monster.

== Reception ==
In Japan, Game Machine listed Tecmo Knight as the sixth most successful table arcade unit of July 1989.
