= Franco (Mirandela) =

Ex-civil parish and village in northern Portugal

- Civil parish
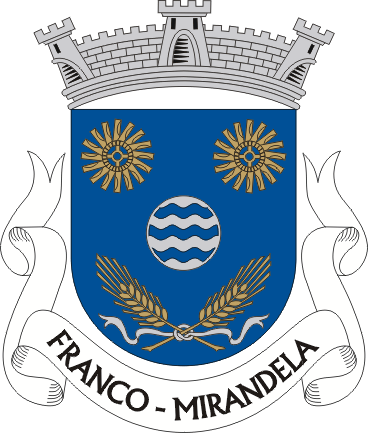
- Coat of arms

- Location in Portugal
- Coordinates: 41°26′05″N 7°20′34″W
- Country: Portugal
- Region: Norte
- Intermunic. comm.: Trás-os-Montes
- District: Bragança
- Municipality: Mirandela
- Disbanded: 28 January 2013

Area
  - Total: 17.15 km^{2} (6.62 sq mi)

Population (2011)
  - Total: 244
  - Density: 14.2/km^{2} (36.8/sq mi)
- Time zone: UTC+00:00 (WET)
  - Summer (DST): UTC+01:00 (WEST)
- Website: www.cm-mirandela.pt/pages/281

Franco is a former civil parish and village located at the westernmost extremity of the municipality of Mirandela, from which it is about 16 km away. The former parish borders the municipalities of Murça (via Palheiros) and Valpaços (via Vales) and lies adjacent to the IP4 motorway junction. It had 17,15 km² of area and 244 inhabitants (2011 census).

The patron saint of the village is Nossa Senhora da Expectação.

The local economy is predominantly based on agriculture, with olive oil, almonds, cereals, wine and cork among its principal products. Livestock farming, particularly involving sheep, goats, oxen and dairy cattle, also contributes to agricultural activities and household income. While some mechanisation has been introduced, traditional farming methods and tools remain in use, as the steep, mountainous terrain and the small size of many landholdings limit the adoption of modern machinery.

== History ==
It is mentioned as early as the Inquirição of 1258.

It was part of the now-defunct municipality of Lamas de Orelhão until 31 December 1853. It was subsequently incorporated into the municipality of Mirandela, something unchanged to this day. Legally, it appears in 1839 as belonging to the municipality of Chaves, before finally passing to Mirandela in 1854.

A market was established there in 1796, held on the 21st of each month. In 1865, the primary school was founded.

In 1950, the parish of Franco (which at the time included Vila Boa) had a population of 1,025, the highest ever recorded for the two villages. On 22 April 1957, Vila Boa ceased to be an annexe and it became its own civil parish.

By 1991, the village of Franco had 308 inhabitants, a figure that had declined to 295 by 2001, of whom 143 were male.

On 28 January 2013, Vila Boa was once again annexed with Franco, forming the Franco e Vila Boa parish following a nationwide administrative reform.

== Population ==
Population of the parish of Franco
Year	Pop.	±%
1864	549	—
1878	548	−0.2%
1890	703	+28.3%
1900	655	−6.8%
1911	650	−0.8%
1920	658	+1.2%
1930	500	−24.0%
1940	884	+76.8%
1950	1,025	+16.0%
1960	596	−41.9%
1970	521	−12.6%
1981	440	−15.5%
1991	308	−30.0%
2001	302	−1.9%
2011	244	−19.2%

Between 1890 and 1930 Vila Boa was part of the Franco parish. By the decree nº 27.424, of 31/12/1936, Vila Boa was integrated into the Franco parish. By the decree nº 41.081, of 22/04/1957, Vila Boa became its own parish.
