= Little Flowers of St. Francis =

14th-century text on Francis of Assisi

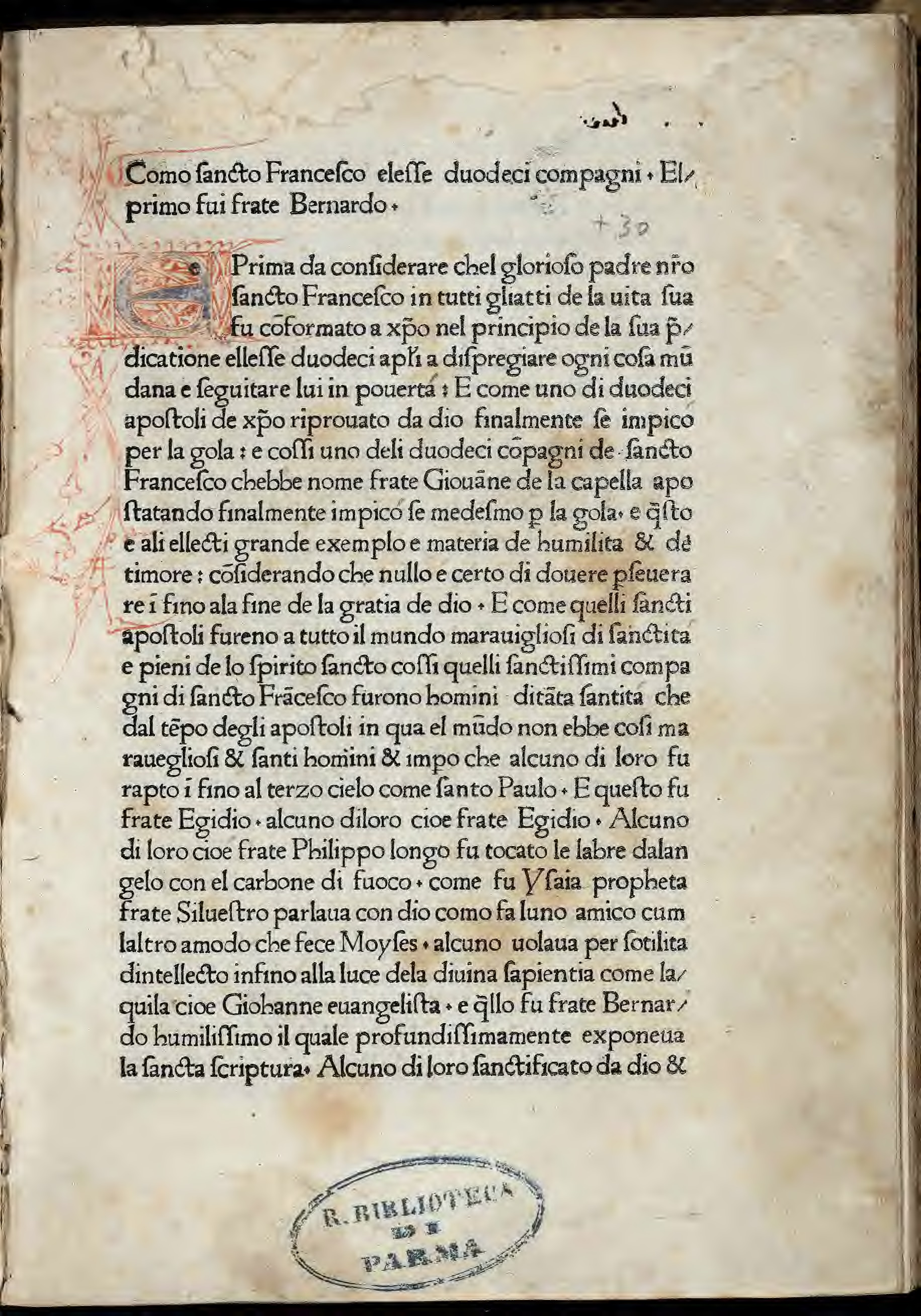
Fioretti

The Little Flowers of St. Francis (Italian: Fioretti di San Francesco) is a florilegium (excerpts of his body of work), divided into 53 short chapters, on the life of Saint Francis of Assisi that was composed at the end of the 14th century. The anonymous Italian text, almost certainly by a Tuscan author, is a version of the Latin Actus beati Francisci et sociorum eius, of which the earliest extant manuscript is one of 1390 AD. Luke Wadding ascribes the text to Ugolino da Santa Maria, whose name occurs three times in the Actus. Most scholars now agree that the author was Ugolino Brunforte (c. 1262 – c. 1348).

== History ==
Little Flowers of Francis of Assisi is the name given to the classic collection of popular legends about the life of Francis of Assisi and his early companions. The main body of the collection was translated into Italian by an unknown fourteenth-century friar from a larger Latin work, the Actus B. Francisci et Sociorum Ejus, attributed to Ugolino Brunforte. The four appendixes (on the stigmata of Francis, the life of Juniper, and the life and the sayings of Egidio) are additions of later compilers.

A striking difference is noticeable between the earlier chapters of the Fioretti, which refer to Francis and his companions, and the later ones, which deal with the friars in the province of the March of Ancona. The first half of the collection reflects traditions that go back to the early days of the order; the other is believed to be substantially the work of Ugolino da Monte Giorgio of the noble family of Brunforte.

Living as he did a century after the death of Francis, Ugolino was dependent on hearsay for much of his information; part of it he is said to have learned from Giacomo da Massa, who had been well known and esteemed by the companions of Francis. Whatever may have been the sources from which Ugolino derived his materials, the fifty-three chapters that constitute the Latin work in question seem to have been written before 1328.

== Stories ==
Written a century and a half after the death of Francis of Assisi, the text is not regarded as an important primary source for the saint's biography. However, it has been the most popular account of his life and relates many colourful anecdotes, miracles and pious examples from the lives of Francis and his followers. These poetic stories shed much light upon the genesis and development of the following of Francis.

Some stories contained in the Fioretti can be found in much earlier works. Fioretti di San Francesco, Chapter 13: Preaching to the Birds relates that Francis, Masseo and Agnolo traveled to and preached at a city called Saburniano (Cannara). Those that heard them were so inflamed by their message that they desired to leave the city and follow these friars into the wilderness. Francis told them that such a thing was not necessary, but instead he established the third order "for the universal salvation of all people". Francis had already been concerned about the expansion of his order at the expense of families. He refused entrance to his order by married men (and the women from admission to the Poor Clares) who sought to follow the Franciscan way, because families should not suffer. Francis preaching to the birds was described by Masseo, and written of by the Englishman Roger of Wendover, in 1236.

The vernacular version is written in Tuscan and is reckoned among the masterpieces of Italian literature. Arthur Livingstone, author of a 1930s edition of the Little Flowers, characterizes it as "a masterful work of folk literature from the Middle Ages".

The earliest manuscript is dated 1390, and is in Berlin. The Italian translation was first printed at Vicenza in 1477.

== In popular culture ==
The text was the inspiration for Roberto Rossellini's 1950 film Francesco, giullare di Dio (Francis, God's Jester), which was co-written by Federico Fellini. It was also used as a source for the libretto of Olivier Messiaen's opera Saint-François d'Assise.

In Lore Segal's short story "Other People's Houses: A Liberal Education" (The New Yorker, February 24, 1961), the narrator's brother and his friend Dolf give the book as a gift to each other.

== See also ==
- Ugolino Brunforte

== eBook ==
- Francis of Assisi, The Little Flowers (fioretti), London, 2012. limovia.net ISBN 978-1-78336-013-0
