= Vila Boa (Mirandela) =

Ex-civil parish and village in northern Portugal

- Civil parish
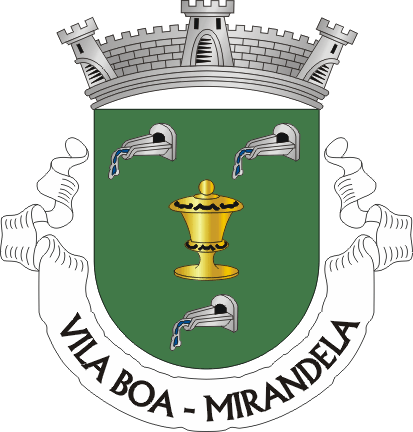
- Coat of arms

- Location in Portugal
- Coordinates: 41°23′42″N 7°20′39″W
- Country: Portugal
- Region: Norte
- Intermunic. comm.: Trás-os-Montes
- District: Bragança
- Municipality: Mirandela
- Established: 22 April 1957
- Disbanded: 28 January 2013

Area
  - Total: 9.33 km^{2} (3.60 sq mi)

Population (2011)
  - Total: 90
  - Density: 9.6/km^{2} (25/sq mi)
- Time zone: UTC+00:00 (WET)
  - Summer (DST): UTC+01:00 (WEST)
- Website: www.cm-mirandela.pt/pages/281

Vila Boa is a former civil parish and village in the municipality of Mirandela. It had 9,33 km² of area and 90 inhabitants (2011 census).

It was established on 22 April 1957 after leaving the Franco parish and in 28 January 2013 it merged with Franco once more to form the new Franco e Vila Boa parish.

== Population ==
Population of the parish of Vila Boa
Year	Pop.	±%
1864	195	—
1878	303	+55.4%
1890	part of Franco	—
1900	part of Franco	—
1911	part of Franco	—
1920	part of Franco	—
1930	part of Franco	—
1940	part of Franco	—
1950	part of Franco	—
1960	278	—
1970	230	−17.3%
1981	256	+11.3%
1991	171	−33.2%
2001	118	−31.0%
2011	90	−23.7%

Between 1890 and 1930 Vila Boa was part of the Franco parish. By the decree nº 27.424, of 31/12/1936, Vila Boa was integrated into the Franco parish. By the decree nº 41.081, of 22/04/1957, Vila Boa became its own parish.
