= Franco Del Giglio =

Argentine footballer

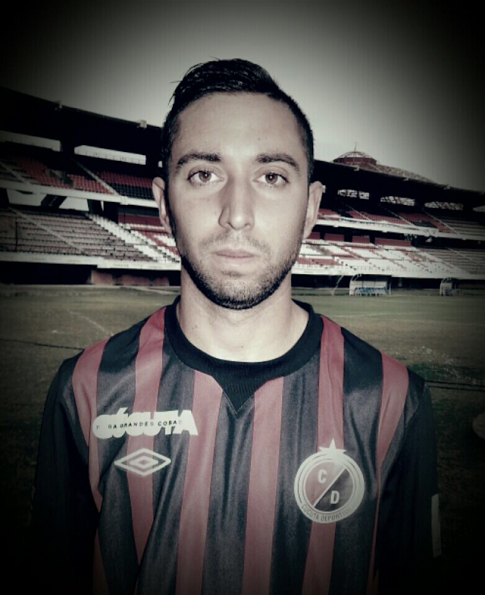

Personal information
- Full name: Franco José Del Giglio Grossi
- Date of birth: 7 January 1993 (age 33)
- Place of birth: Rosario, Argentina
- Height: 1.66 m (5 ft 5 in)
- Position: Midfielder

Youth career
- Rosario Central
- River

Senior career*
Years	Team	Apps	(Gls)
2015	Cúcuta Deportivo	5	(0)
2016	Argentino (Rosario)	17	(1)
2017	ATSV Wolfsberg	15	(0)
2017	NTSV Strand 08	3	(0)
2018	Coquimbo Unido	3	(0)
2018	Central Córdoba (Rosario)		
2018–2019	Monticelli		
2019	Fortis Juventus		
2020	Atlético Vega Real		
- * Club domestic league appearances and goals

Franco José Del Giglio Grossi (born 7 January 1993) is an Argentine professional footballer who most recently played as a midfielder for Atlético Vega Real.

== Career ==
Before the 2015 season, Del Giglio signed for Colombian top flight side Cúcuta Deportivo, where he made ten appearances and scored two goals. On 15 February 2015, he debuted for Cúcuta Deportivo during a 3–0 loss to Millonarios.

On 18 February 2015, Del Giglio scored his first goal for Cúcuta Deportivo during a 5–1 win over Real Santander. In 2016, he signed for Argentino (Rosario) in the Argentine fifth division. Before the second half of 2016–17, Del Giglio signed for Austrian third division club ATSV Wolfsberg. In 2017, he signed for NTSV Strand 08 in the German fifth division. Before the 2018 season, he signed for Chilean second division team Coquimbo Unido.

In 2018, Del Giglio signed for Central Córdoba (Rosario) in the Argentine fourth division. In 2019, he signed for Italian team Monticelli. Before the 2020 season, he signed for Atlético Vega Real in the Dominican Republic.
