= Franko (bishop of Poznań) =

Polish bishop

Franko was an 11th-century Polish Bishop of Poznań.

He was the first bishop of Poznan after the renewal of the diocese by Bolesław the bold in 1075 AD.

He is known from the Chronicles of the Galla Anonima, and was Bishop of Poznań, from 1070 to around 1085 AD. He advised Prince Władysław Herman and his wife Judith to send gifts to the shrine in the Saint-Gilles for the birth of a male heir.

The date of his death is not known, but his successor, Eckhard, was consecrated between 1097 and 1102 AD.

== See also ==
- Franco (bishop)

== Bibliography ==
Religious titles
| Preceded by Ederam | Bishop of Poznań; 1085-1100 | Succeeded by Eckhard |
