= Guillermo Franco (footballer, born 1983) =

Argentine football defender

Personal information
- Full name: Guillermo Lucas Franco
- Date of birth: May 21, 1983 (age 43)
- Place of birth: Buenos Aires, Argentina
- Height: 1.88 m (6 ft 2 in)
- Position: Centre back

Youth career
- 2002–2003: Lanús

Senior career*
Years	Team	Apps	(Gls)
2003–2004	Los Andes	28	(0)
2004	Defensa y Justicia	6	(0)
2007–2010	Godoy Cruz	37	(0)
2009–2010	→ I. Rivadavia (loan)	22	(0)
2010–2011	Atlético Rafaela	21	(1)
2011–2012	Gimnasia de Jujuy	20	(1)
2012–2013	SC Pacífico	31	(2)
2013–2014	Huracán San Rafael	22	(0)
2014–2015	Deportivo Maipú	13	(1)
2015	Unión Villa Krause	24	(0)
2016	Deportivo Español	18	(0)
2016–2018	Juventud Unida	19	(2)
- * Club domestic league appearances and goals as of 18:24, 24 March 2020 (UTC)

Guillermo Franco (born 21 May 1983 in Buenos Aires) is a retired Argentine football defender.

== Football career ==
After playing for Los Andes and Defensa y Justicia, Franco joined Godoy Cruz in 2002. He played with the team in the Argentine Primera until 2009, when he dropped down a division to play for Independiente Rivadavia one season on loan. He returned to Godoy Cruz in 2010, but was immediately loaned to Atlético de Rafaela.

== Outside football ==
In 2002, Franco became a member of the Church of Jesus Christ of Latter-day Saints (LDS Church). He resigned from Godoy Cruz in 2005 to serve as a Mormon missionary in the LDS Church's Argentina Mendoza Mission. In 2007, he returned from his mission and was brought back into the Godoy Cruz squad.
