= Gazzetta Ticinese =

Swiss newspaper published 1821–1996

- First page of the 30 October 1996 edition
- Type: Daily newspaper
- Owner(s): Veladini printing house (1821–1928); Anonymous society (1928–1996)
- Publisher: Veladini printing house
- Language: Italian
- Headquarters: Lugano, Ticino
- Country: Switzerland
- Circulation: ~4,500 (1990)

The Gazzetta Ticinese was a Swiss newspaper published in Lugano from January 1821 to October 1996. Published by the Veladini printing house, it was founded following the suppression of the Gazzetta di Lugano.

== Publication history ==
Initially serving also as an official gazette, the newspaper was admitted into the Kingdom of Lombardy–Venetia, although its distribution beyond the border had to be renegotiated several times with Milanese censorship. Its circulation is not quantifiable, but distribution is documented in the main centers of central and northern Italy; later, from the mid-19th century, the newspaper was also present overseas, in the United States and Australia, where it followed the routes of Ticinese emigration.

The newspaper initially consisted of four pages, to which was added for a short period the Appendice letteraria alla Gazzetta ticinese, a supplement of cultural interest edited by Stefano Franscini (1824–1825). The periodical changed its publication frequency several times: initially weekly (until December 1842), it then appeared three times a week (January 1843 – June 1855), then four times (July 1855 – December 1865), before becoming a daily (January 1866 – April 1990).

In financial difficulty, the Gazzetta Ticinese appeared twice a week from May 1990 (when circulation was around 4,500 copies), then became weekly from April 1992; it ceased publication in October 1996.

== Political orientation ==
The liberal orientation of the Gazzetta Ticinese, already perceptible previously, became more explicit after its merger in April 1895 with the ephemeral Idea Moderna, founded in January of the same year. Following this operation, Emilio Bossi and Francesco Chiesa joined the editorial staff, directed by Francesco Veladini. With Milesbo, pseudonym of Bossi, who was editor (1896–1902) and then director (1915–1920), the daily moved toward radical positions. From January 1920, it became, alongside the daily Il Dovere, one of the organs of the Ticino Liberal-Radical Party (PLRT), a status also adopted by L'Avanguardia from October 1928 (Radical-Democratic Party).

After approaching the Mussolini regime during the brief period when it was directed by Antonio Scanziani (April 1928 – January 1929), the Gazzetta Ticinese became, under the direction of Fulvio Bolla (1929–1943), the mouthpiece of the liberal right and maintained an ambivalent attitude toward fascism, as evidenced by the support given to Francisco Franco at the outbreak of the Spanish Civil War in 1936. Ownership of the newspaper passed in 1928 to an anonymous society that replaced the previous association. Opposed to L'Avanguardia, expression of the left wing of the PLRT, clearly anti-fascist, and to Il Dovere, which held median positions, the Gazzetta Ticinese renounced in February 1934, following the split that had led a few weeks earlier to the birth of the Ticino Liberal-Radical Democratic Party, its status as organ of the PLRT; in the following decades, it continued to represent the opinions of the liberal right. From the 1970s, Franco Masoni contributed significantly, also on the editorial level, to defining the political line of the newspaper.

== Bibliography ==
- Blaser, Fritz: Bibliographie de la presse suisse, vol. 1, 1956, p. 437.
- Mena, Fabrizio: Stamperie ai margini d'Italia. Editori e librai nella Svizzera italiana, 1746-1848, 2003.
- Macaluso, Pompeo: Liberali antifascisti. Storia del Partito Liberale Radicale Democratico Ticinese (1926-1946), 2004.
- Gilardoni, Silvano: «Stampa ticinese», in: Azione, 13.2-23.10.2007 (series of 13 articles).
