= Buling-Buling Festival =

Annual event in Pandacan, Manila

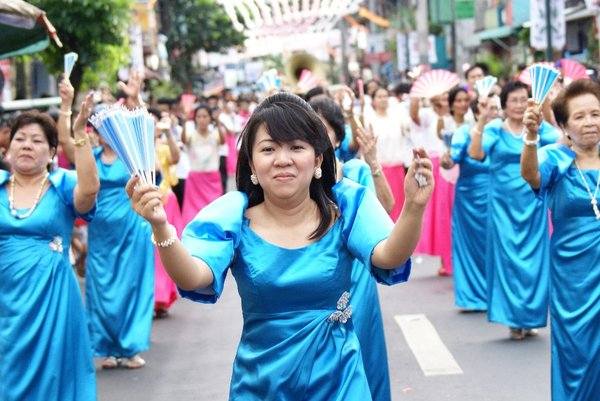
Members of the Women of the Philippine Independent Church (WOPIC) of the Iglesia Filipina Independiente - Parish of the Sto. Nino of Pandacan seen here performing the Buling-Buling dance.

Buling-Buling Festival is a religious and cultural event celebrated annually in Pandacan, Manila in the Philippines on the third Saturday of January, in time with the town's fiesta, to honor its patron, Santo Niño — a wooden image of child Jesus Christ. It is a festival of street dancing where its people, Pandaqueños who are well-dressed in traditional Filipino costumes, dance along the streets of Pandacan accompanied by marching bands. In 2005, it was adopted as Manila's official cultural dance identity.

== History ==
The cultural dance, Buling-Buling, comes from the Filipino word “buling-buli” which locally means well-polished or well-prepared signifying something or somebody well-groomed for an event or occasion. This is manifested in its colorful celebration with graceful and well-practiced dance movements and detailed indigenous costumes.

According to the narrative of historian Mendoza (1979), the street dance festival first began in 1800, decades after the establishment of the town's parish church. In those days, only the ladies in Pandacan participated in the street dancing as well-described by Mendoza (1979):

“There is a beautiful performance by the ladies in Pandacan that dates back to early times and this is done during the vigil of the fiesta, called Buling-buling. Beautiful ladies are chosen for their ability to sing and dance well, as they will sing and dance along the streets accompanied by guitars or an orchestra. And while they do so on the way to the church, young men throw them coins, flowers, and confetti from the roadside. Everyone is joyous.”

When the Second World War broke out, lives changed including the Buling-Buling which ceased to be practiced by the people. It was only in the late 1970s when the Samahang Sining at Kalinangan ng Pandacan (SSKP), founded by Ricardo B. Mendoza, initiated the revival of the colorful dance festival.

Since then, it has been instituted as a kind of ritual by men and women who dance to the accompaniment of musical instruments such as guitars, bandurrias, orchestra, and marching bands.

== Purpose ==
The main purpose of this festival is to give praise and thanksgiving to Santo Niño de Pandacan for all the blessings its community has received. This is particularly shown during the performance when the image of Santo Niño is moved around the dancers to keep them under His protection — suggesting the real life experience of its people when they ask for guidance and protection at times in need. The blessings the town has received and has been grateful for include some miraculous events of Santo Niño that saved the town over the years:

- In 1896, the Spanish authorities learned that Pandacan was the meeting place of the revolutionaries. Pandacan was decreed to be ruled under the “Juez de Cuchillo,” meaning the town would be bombed. When the cannons were brought in Nagtahan and aimed at the church, a small child was seen on top of the cannon. The commander, dreadfully struck, suspended the almost certain annihilation of the parishioners.
- In 1911, Fr. Silvino Manalo placed the Santo Niño at the church tower's window facing the maddening fire approaching Pandacan. The wind changed its course and Pandacan was saved from a great conflagration.
- On December 18, 1941, the late parish priest Rev. Fr. Teodoro Francisco, fearing the possible explosion of Pandacan due to the oil tanks and depot ignited by the United States Army Forces in the Far East (USSAFE) before retreating to Bataan, tried to secure the image of Santo Niño but it could not be removed from its pedestal. The feared explosion did not happen and Pandacan was once again spared.

== Dance ==
The dance is basically composed of basic steps with hands and feet moving from side to side. In the present, the SSKP — a community-based organization for culture and the arts — came up with three types of dance based on the movement of hands and on the intention of dancing as well. Dance for praising, dance for giving respect, and dance for offering are the basic dances to be repeatedly performed.

Additionally, the dancers are given the chance to interpret the song differently as separate groups. As the various groups invent their movements and steps, the hand-raising floral offering to the Santo Niño is considered as the unifying Buling-Buling dance movement.

== Music ==
Buling-Buling dance has always been accompanied by marching bands. Guitars, ukuleles, and bandurrias were once used to sing and dance to. Today, the “Buling-Buling 2004” is the musical piece that all the dance movements should be based from. It is a composition of Pastor de Jesus with lyrics by Ernesto Mendoza — both were natives of this town. It is commonly performed in 2/4 time signature.

== Participants ==
Participating dancers include all public and private school teachers in both elementary and secondary within the vicinity as well as several civic organizations. The costumes worn in this festival are inspired by traditional clothes such as Filipiñiana for women and barong tagalog for men.

The church's respective clergy together with its sacristans is the first to line up in the parade. They bring bottles of Holy Water to bless all Pandaqueños watching the festival outside their homes.

Other participants are the city officials with the presence of the Mayor, Vice-Mayor, and 6th District Councilors of Manila. Barangay chairpersons usually hold the title of “Hermano Mayor” and “Hermana Mayor” — the main sponsors of this event. During the tercentennial celebration of the Pandacan's parish church, well-known people were invited to be the main sponsors who were capable enough to shoulder large amount of needed funds. The former Philippine's first lady Imelda Marcos, who has a townhouse in Pandacan and once lived here, was the Hermana Mayor while the famous businessman Joel Cruz, who grew up in this town and founded the Aficionado, was the Hermano Mayor.

== Historical Buling-Buling ==
=== Ecumenical observances ===
In 2007 the Catholic Church, which venerates a wooden image of Santo Niño and has long hosted the Buling-Buling, and the Philippine Independent Church or Aglipayans—which venerates an ivory image of the same—jointly participated in the festival for the first time in history.

Through this festival, the long history of hostility between the two denominations, each vociferously claiming their Santo Niño is the authentic one, had finally ended. Moreover, the theme for that year was “Isang Higanteng Indak sa Pagkakaisa” ("One Giant Dance in Unity"). Fr. Lázaro Abaco, the Catholic vicar, and Fr. Ted Dimla, the Aglipayan vicar, also led a joint prayer and Bible service at the Liwasang Balagtas. Since then, the ivory and wooden images of the Santo Niño have been leading street dancers along with their respective parishioners in the festival.

=== Lakbay-Dalangin ===
In November 2011, 150 parishioners of the Sto. Niño de Pandacan Parish Church joined a pilgrimage to Cebu and Bohol to widely spread the devotion to the Santo Niño and to appreciate more the country's cultural heritage. The Pandaqueños along with their priests Fr. Lazaro Abaco, Fr. Ikon Supremo, Fr. Russel Ocampo, Fr. Michael Villaflor, and Fr. Sol performed the Buling-Buling dance to the Holy Child of Cebu and to the parishioners of Loboc and Baclayon Churches in Bohol. The Buling-Buling dance, choreographed by Sister Myrna Verecio, was the highlight of every pilgrimage.

=== Grand Buling-Buling Worship Dance Festival ===
On November 24, 2012, a special event entitled “Grand Buling-Buling” was held in the patio of Pandacan's Roman Catholic Church in line with its tercentennial celebration. It was still the same as the ordinary Buling-Buling festival but turned out to be a competition among the thirty (30) barangays including the parish in Pandacan. Each barangay led by their respective Hermanas and Hermanos had unique interpretation of the Buling-Buling dance with distinct costumes and props.

== Manila's Official Cultural Dance Identity ==
In 2005, a city ordinance, City Council Resolution No. 65, was enacted by the Manila City Council declaring Buling-Buling festival to be Manila's official cultural dance identity. It was led by then City Councilor of the 6th District, Beth Rivera, whose aim was to boost the city's tourism prospects by magnifying its rich cultural history in dance, music, and festivities through this Buling-Buling festival. This resulted to a growing number of tourists, here and abroad, visiting the place every year to witness and taste a distinct celebration of Filipino culture.
