= Places of interest in Pandacan =

Pandacan being established as a community in 1574 is considered as one of the oldest districts in Manila and contains several notable places rich in heritage. It is home to a few well-known historical figures, historical landmarks and hosts a number of ancestral houses.

== Location ==
Notable residential structures built from the 1960s or earlier can be found along the streets leading to the Sto. Nino de Pandacan Parish Church, namely Teodora San Luis street, Labores street, Industria street and Narciso street.

== Ancestral Houses ==
=== Romualdez Mansion ===
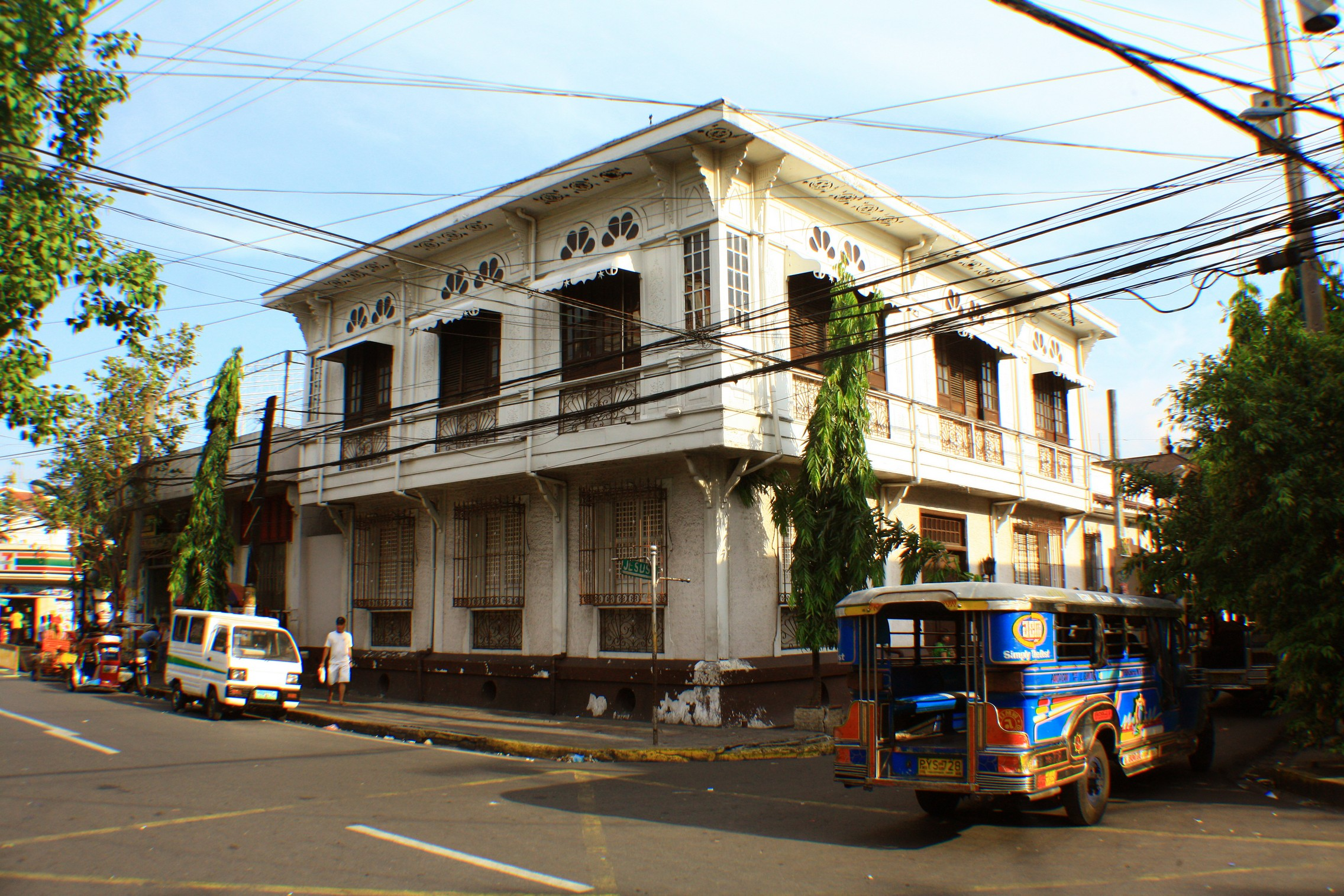
View of the Romualdez Mansion from Jesus street

Located at the Jesus Corner San Luis, the Romualdez Mansion is an ancestral house belonging to Daniel Romualdez who also served as the Cabeza de Barangay during his time. He is the paternal grandfather of politician Daniel Romualdez and a distant relative of Imelda Marcos.

The Romualdez Mansion is a pre-war residential building with a flat facade which borrows some features from the secessionist architecture characterized by ornate metal grills and floral engravings. Another distinctive feature is the intricately designed patterns punctured on the eaves supported by triangular support which was also applied to its voladas.

=== Thelmo House ===
Currently owned by the Thelmo family, the house is believed to be the former residence of Justice Natividad Almeda-Lopez, the first female lawyer in the Philippines. In popular culture, the house continues to be a popular filming sites for local television series and movies.

The Thelmo House is Pandacan’s favored house of shoot. And this is easy to understand. Built before World War II on an 800 sq m lot, it is the street’s sole property with high concrete fence and a garden in front a brick and concrete two-storey Venetian-style villa. An arched front door in floral motif opens to a massive balayong staircase. The backside is made of bricks to check soil erosion from the estero beside the property. Although it has undergone minor maintenance jobs such as repainting of the exterior that somehow removed traces of its age, the Thelmo House has seen better times. The garage at the far end had been converted into a carinderia that operates irregularly.

A television or film crew’s partiality for the Thelmo House is plausible. They get the favored status from its barangay: Teodora San Luis St. is closed for traffic and can be used for parking lot for the gen sets and cast and crew vehicles, provide security services, and even an unobtrusive neighborhood ready to act as extras if required. But nobody knows until when shoots can be held at the Thelmo House or, for that matter, if it will continue to exist, as it has been up for sale for P25M for the longest time. The security assurance here is to declare it as a heritage house that it duly deserves.

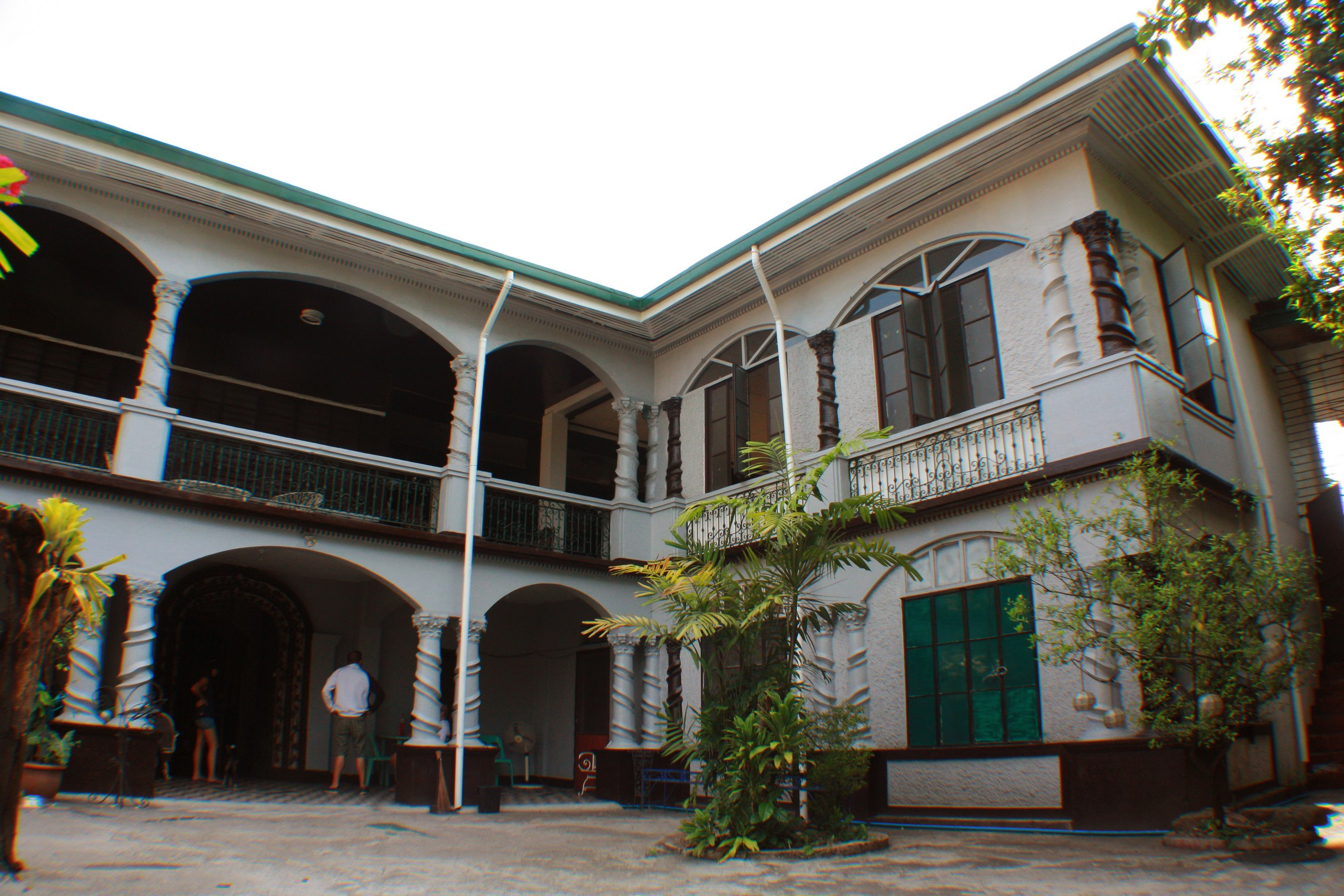
Inside the "Thelmo House"

== Prominent Historical Figures from Pandacan ==
Pandacan was home to prominent Filipino artists of the 19th century and these people are commemorated with historical markers along the streets of Pandacan District.

=== Ladislao Bonus ===
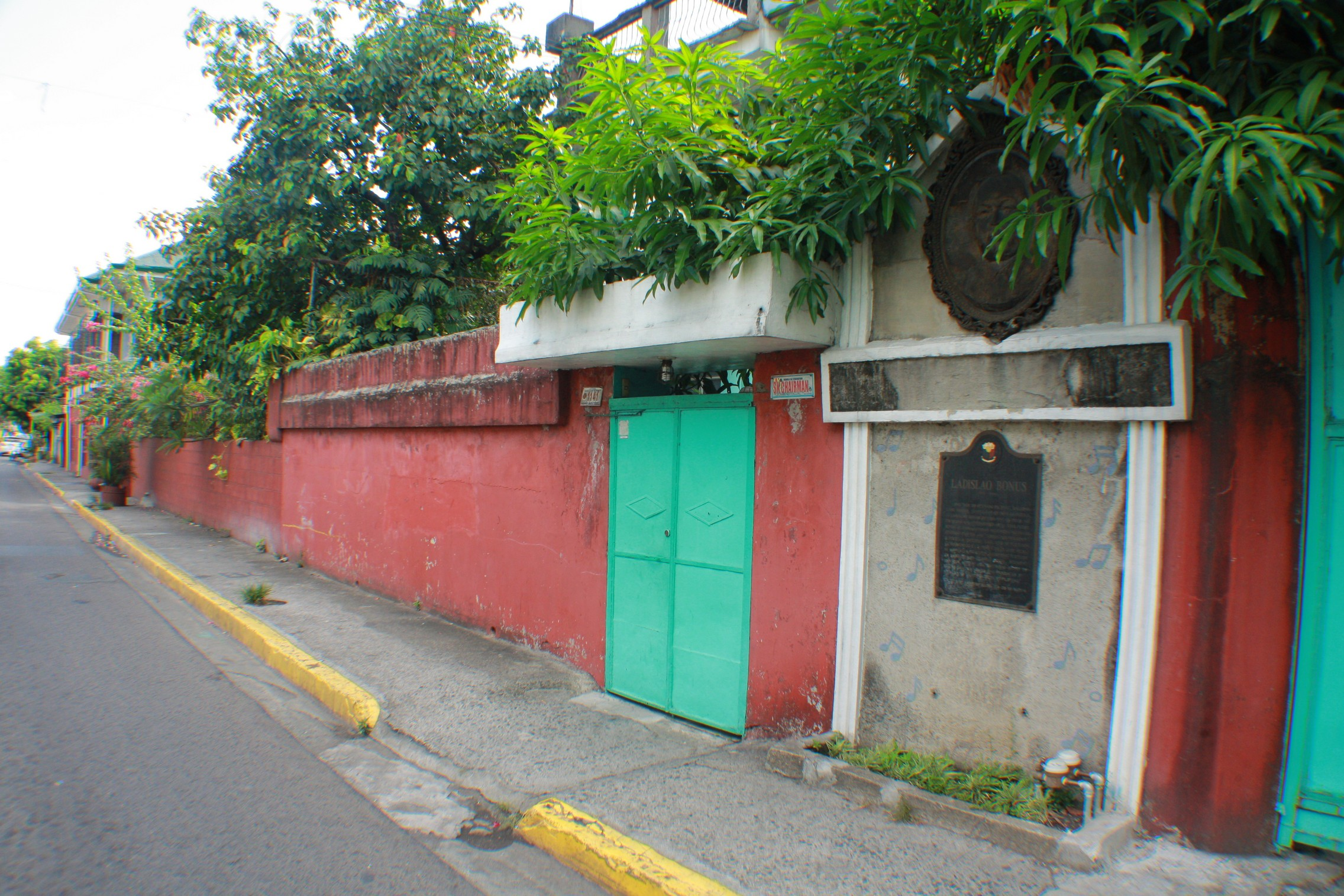
The Ladislao Bonus marker as viewed along San Luis street

Ladislao Bonus was a composer, conductor, contrabass player, and teacher. His pioneering work on musical drama earned him the title as the "Father of the Filipino opera. He was born and raised in Pandacan. As tribute to his greatest contribution to the Philippine Opera, a historical marker inscribed in 1980 was erected along San Luis Street.

=== Fr. Jacinto Zamora ===
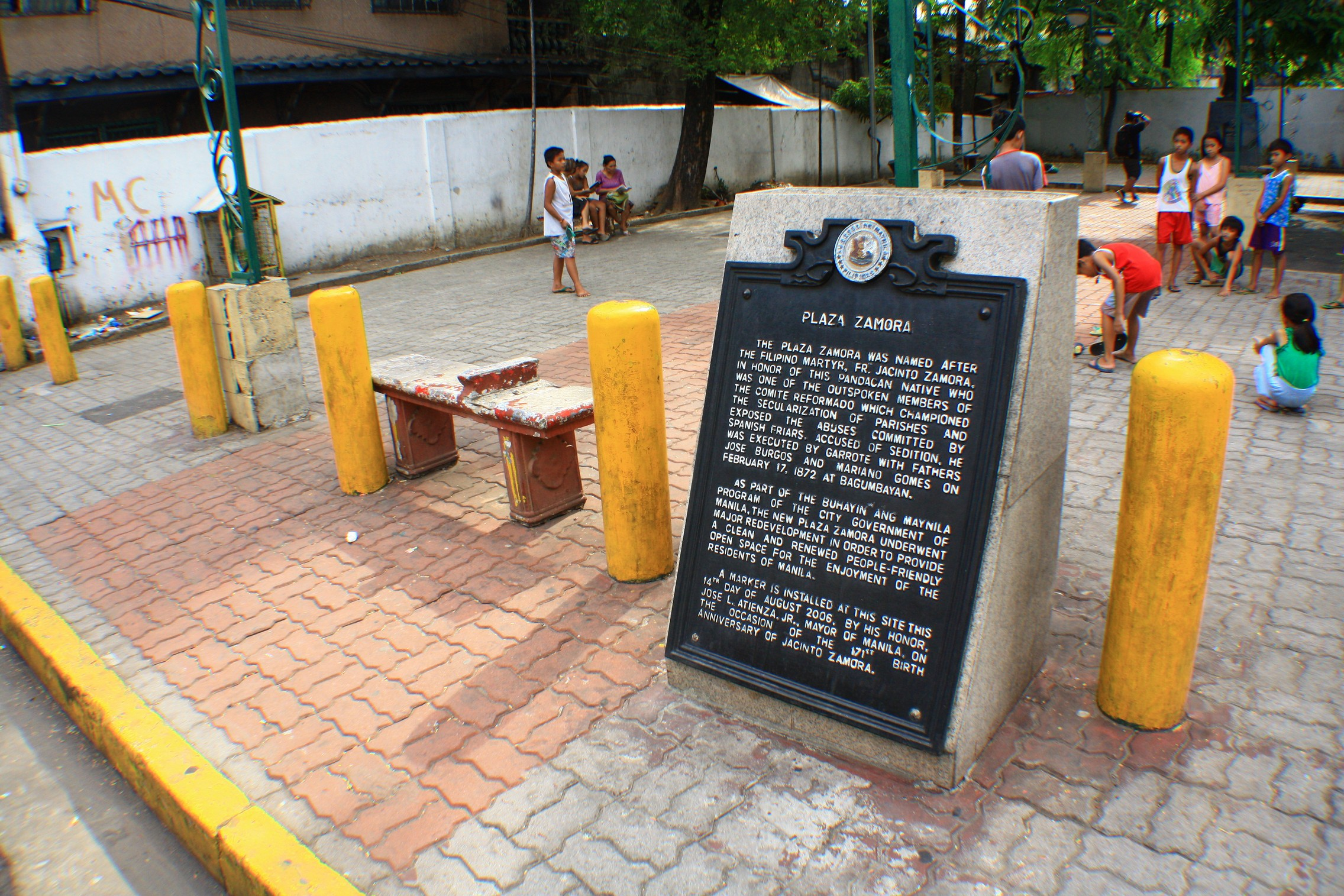
Padre Zamora marker along San Luis street

Jacinto Zamora is widely-known as one of the Gomburza trio who were summarily executed by the Spanish colonial officials because of their influence to the Secularization movement. Zamora, along with Jose Burgos and Mariano Gomez, became the inspiration to Jose Rizal's subversive novel, El Filibusterismo which depicts the abuse of Spanish government. Zamora began his early education in Pandacan, Manila and later graduated with the degree of Bachelor of Canon and Civil Laws. He then continued his training for priesthood in the Seminary of Manila. Because of his role on advocating the rights of the Filipino priests, a monument is erected in his honor at a place known as Plaza Zamora along San Luis Street where his house had once stood.

=== Francisco Balagtas ===
Francisco Balagtas also known as Francisco Baltazar, was a prominent Filipino poet, and is widely considered as one of the greatest Filipino literary laureate for his impact on Filipino literature. He is originally from Bigaa, Bulacan but moved to Pandacan in 1835 where he met María Asunción Rivera, who would effectively serve as the muse for his future works. His famous epic, Florante at Laura, is regarded as his defining work. She is referenced in Florante at Laura as 'Celia' and 'MAR'. Because of his greatest contribution to the Philippine literature, a plaza and park Pandacan known as Plaza Balagtas was constructed in his honor.

== Image gallery ==
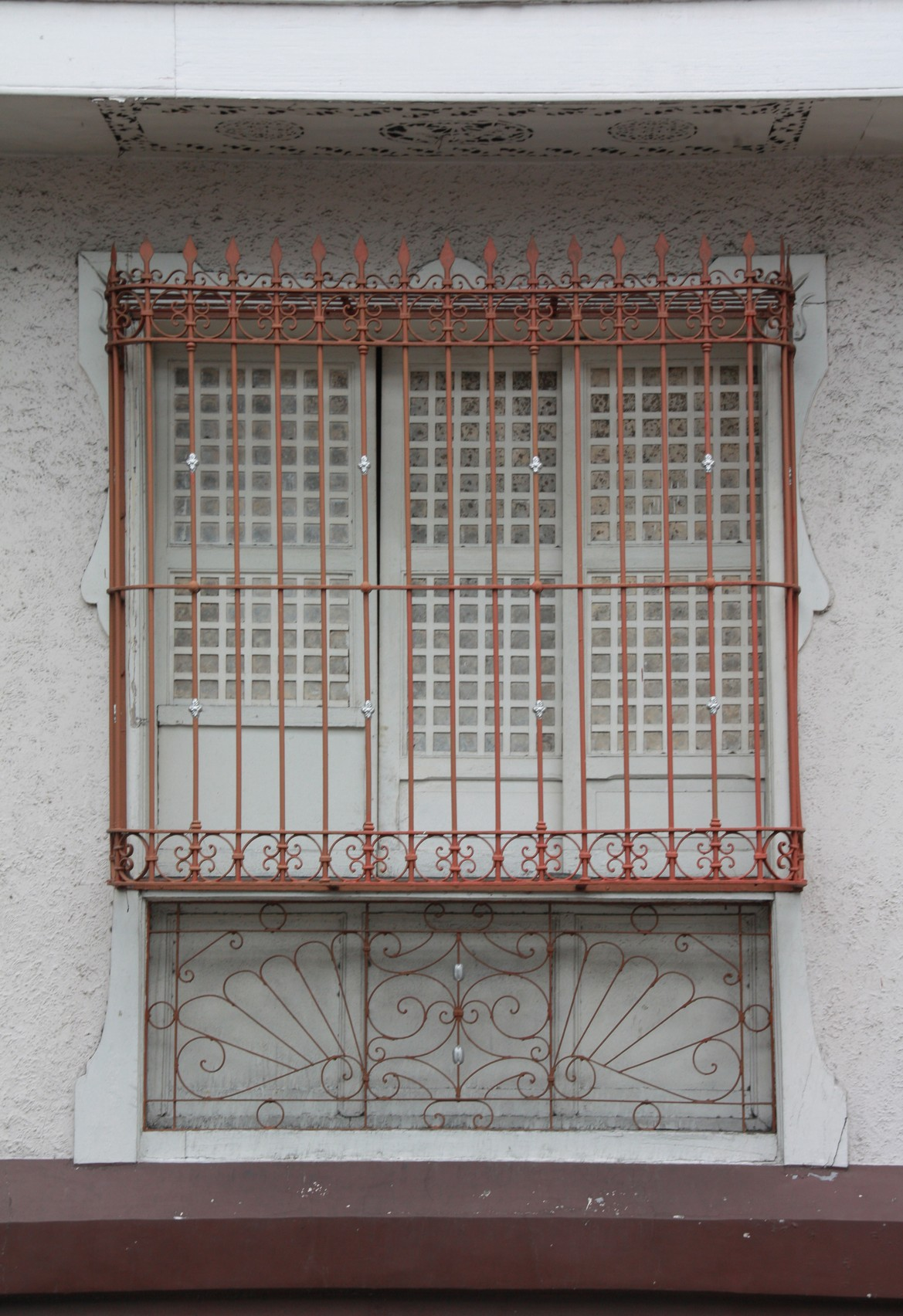
Details of a window in the first level of the Romualdez Mansion

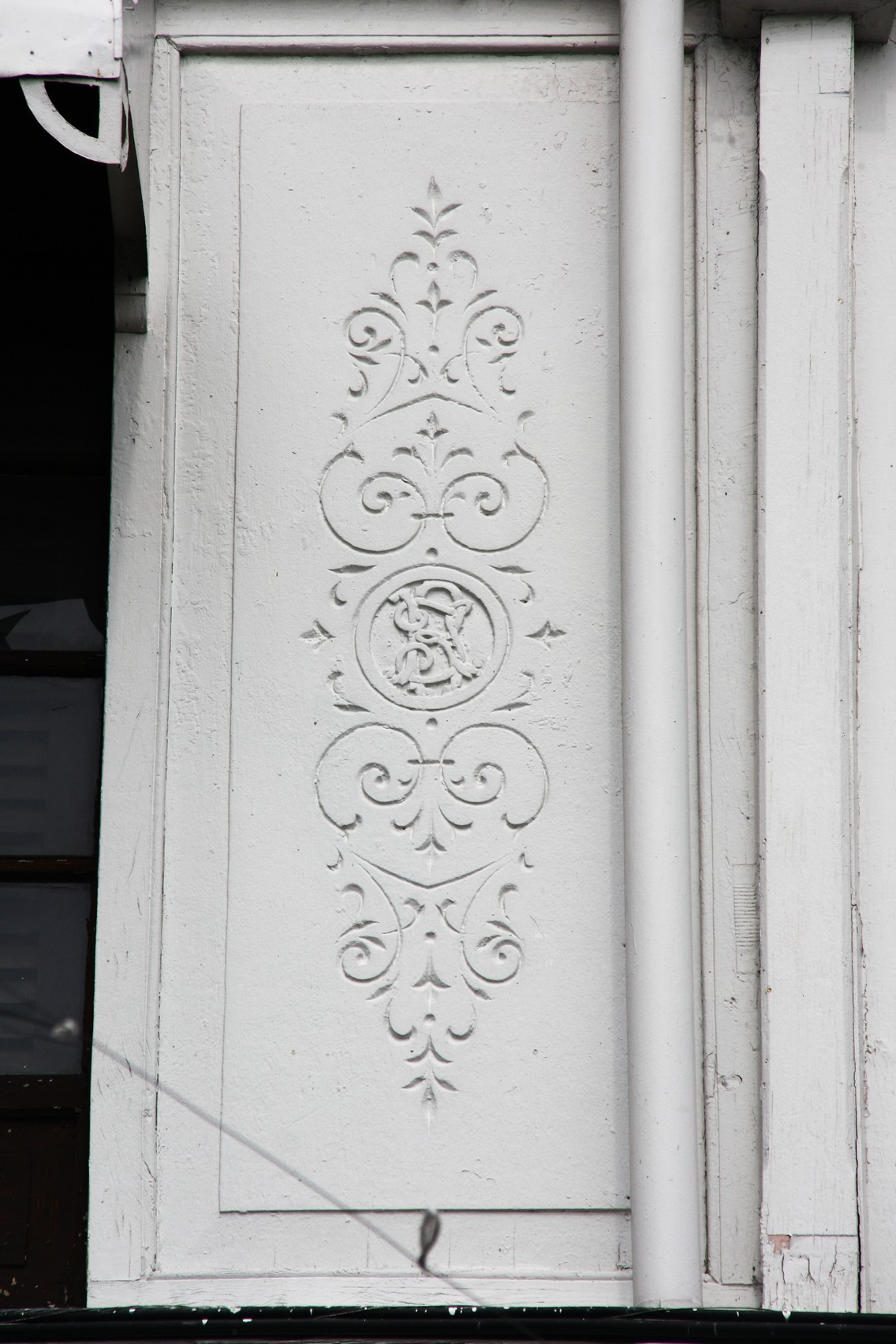
Decorative elements in the walls of the Romualdez Mansion

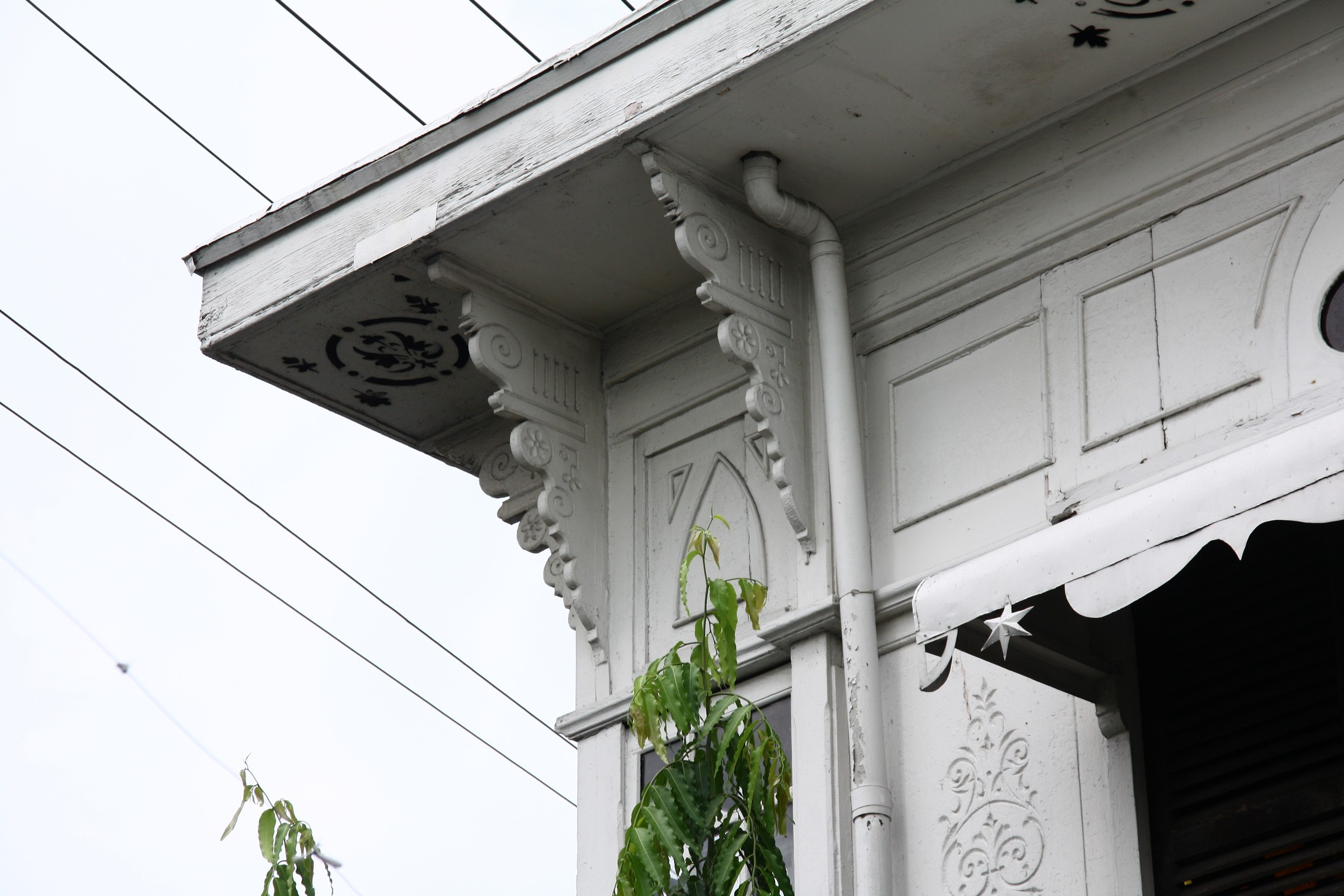
Details of the roof of the Romualdez Mansion

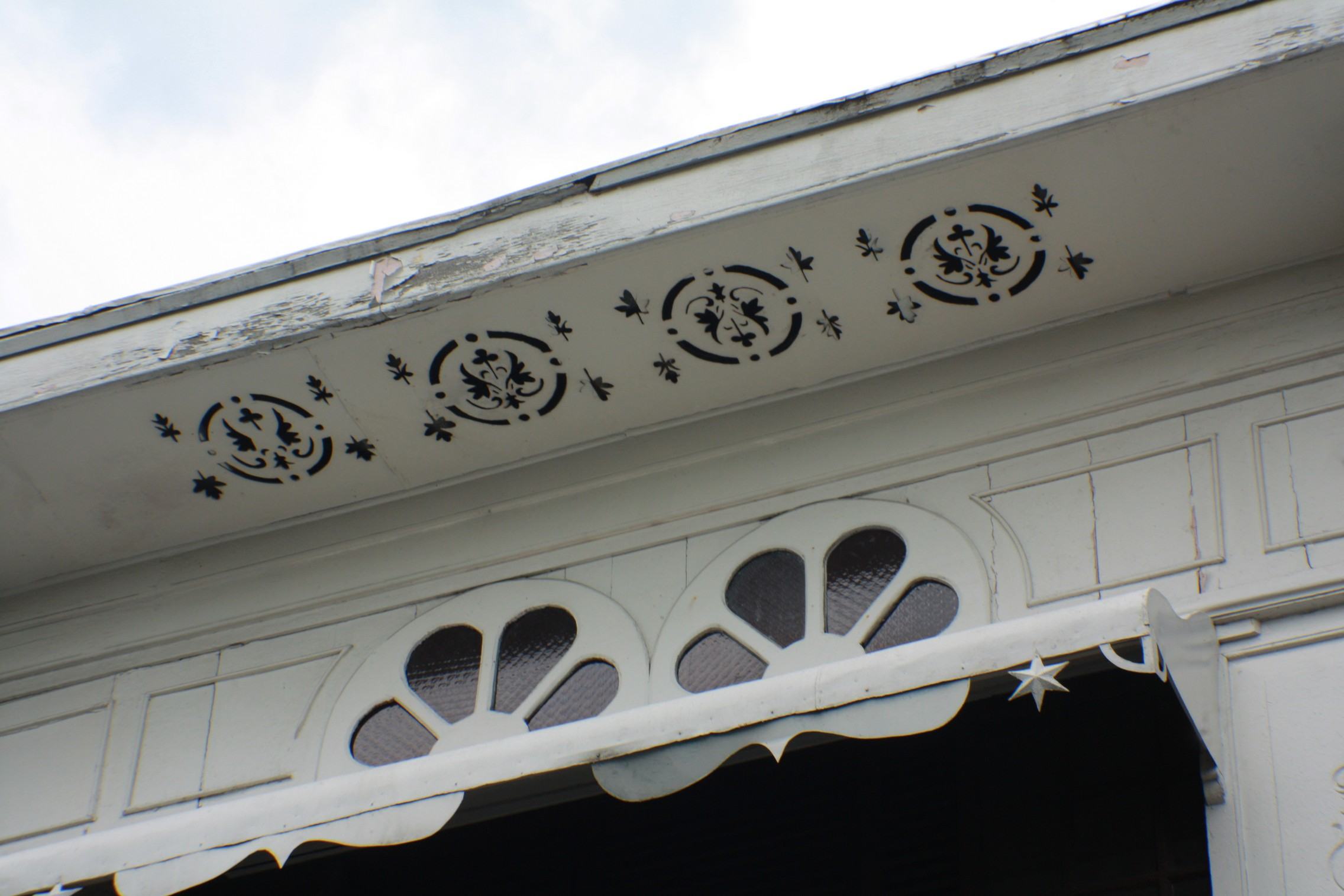
Details of the windows on the second floor of the Romualdez Mansion

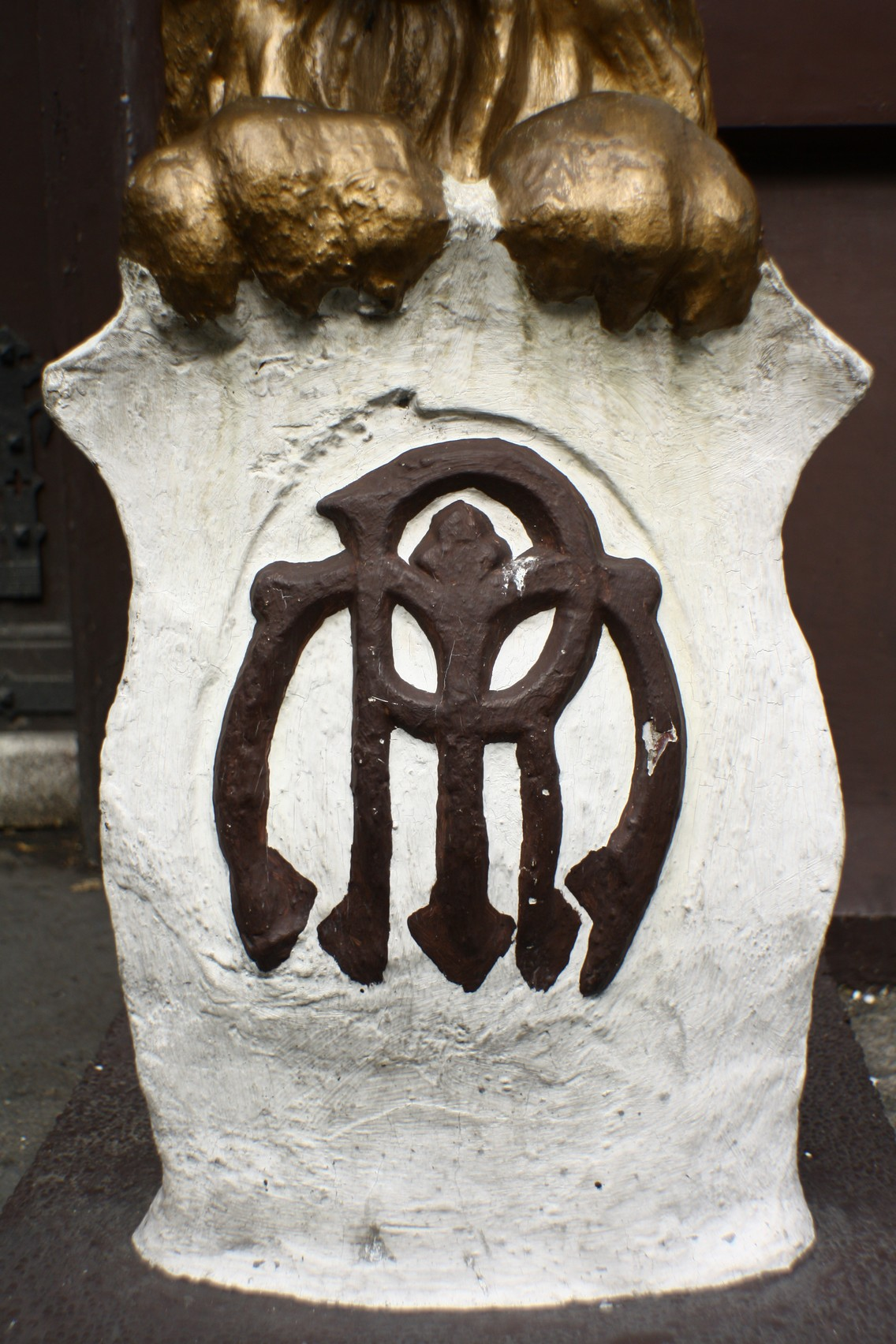
Emblem displayed outside the Romualdez Mansion

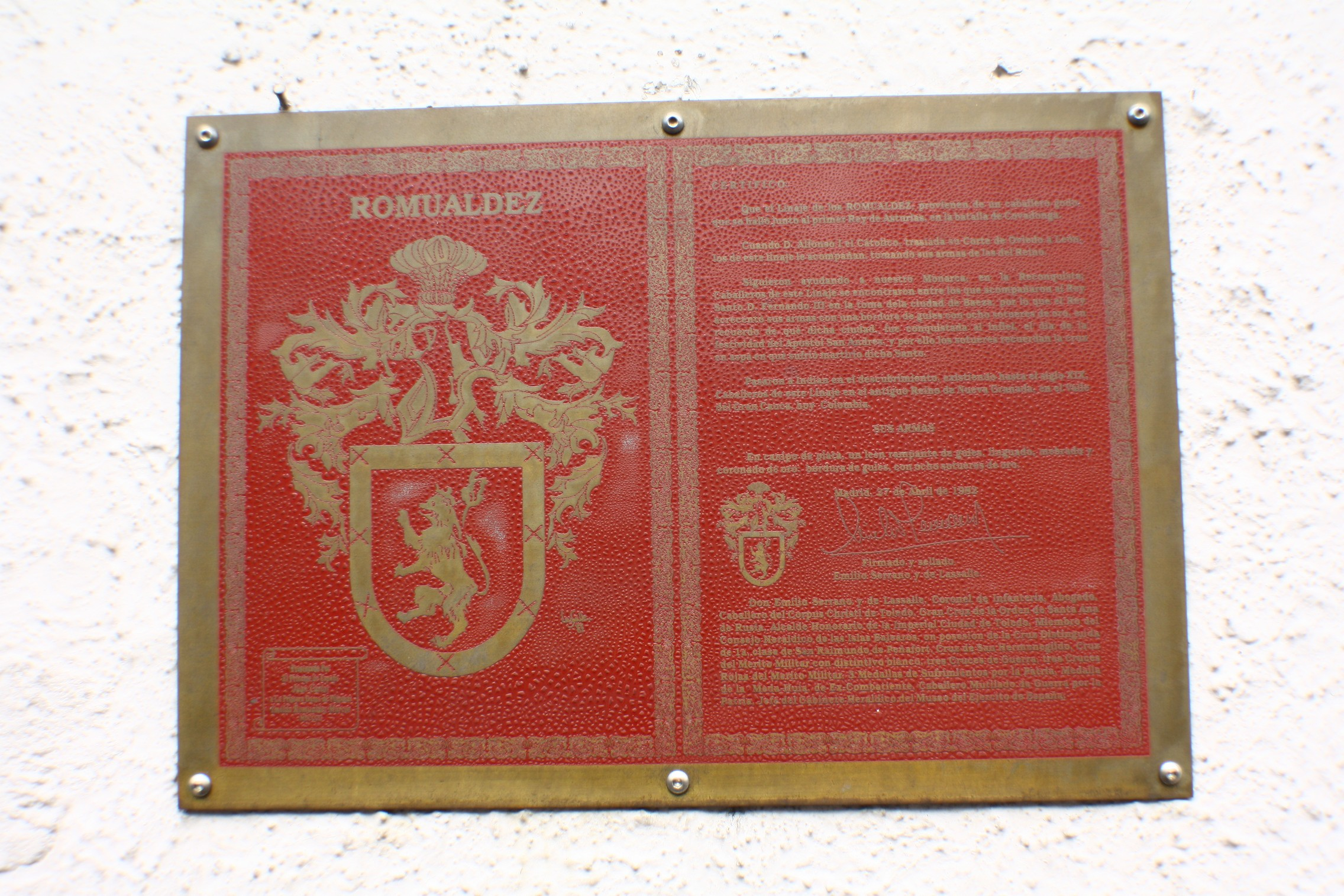
Plaque installed in front of the Romualdez Mansion

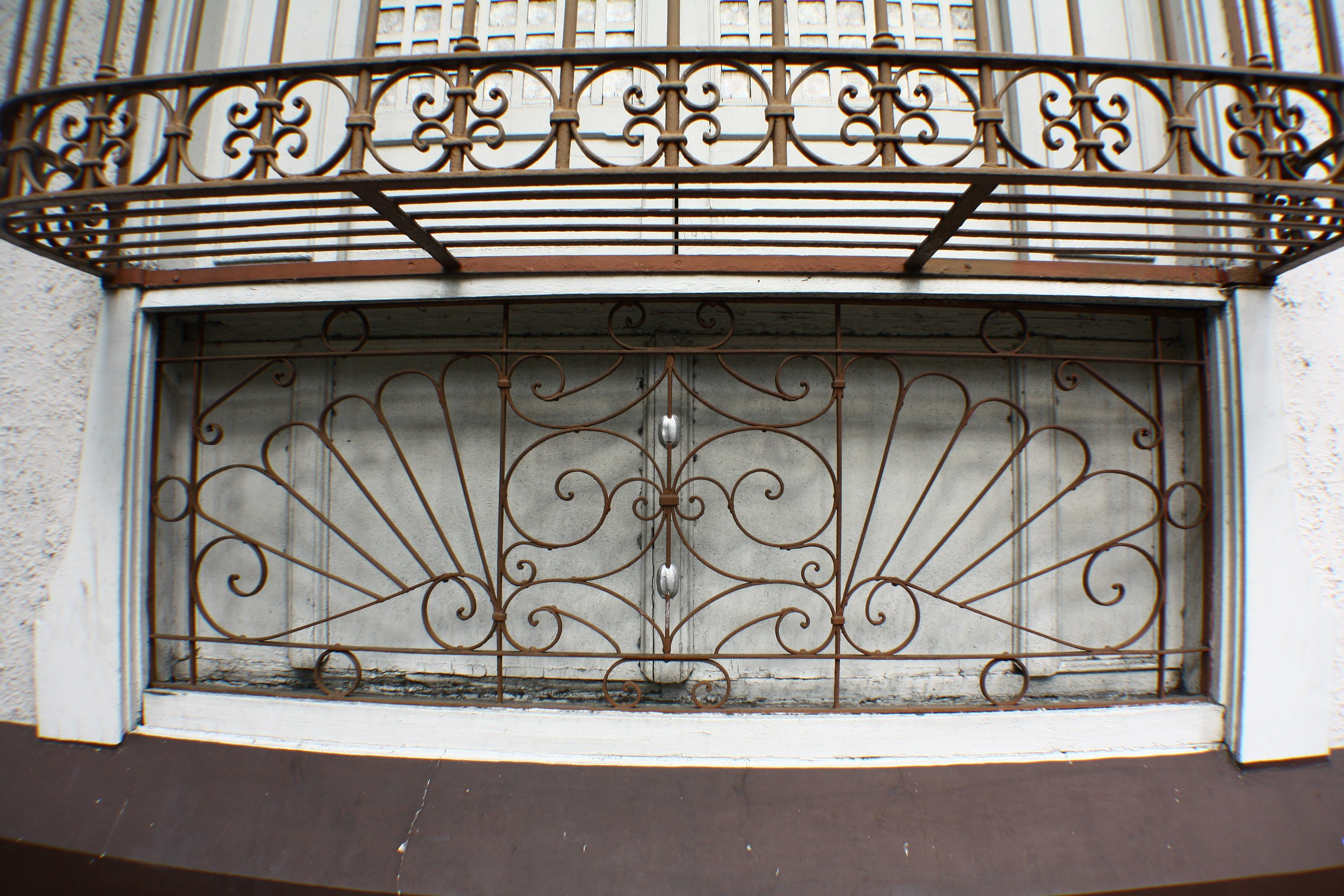
Details of the windows on the first floor of the Romualdez Mansion

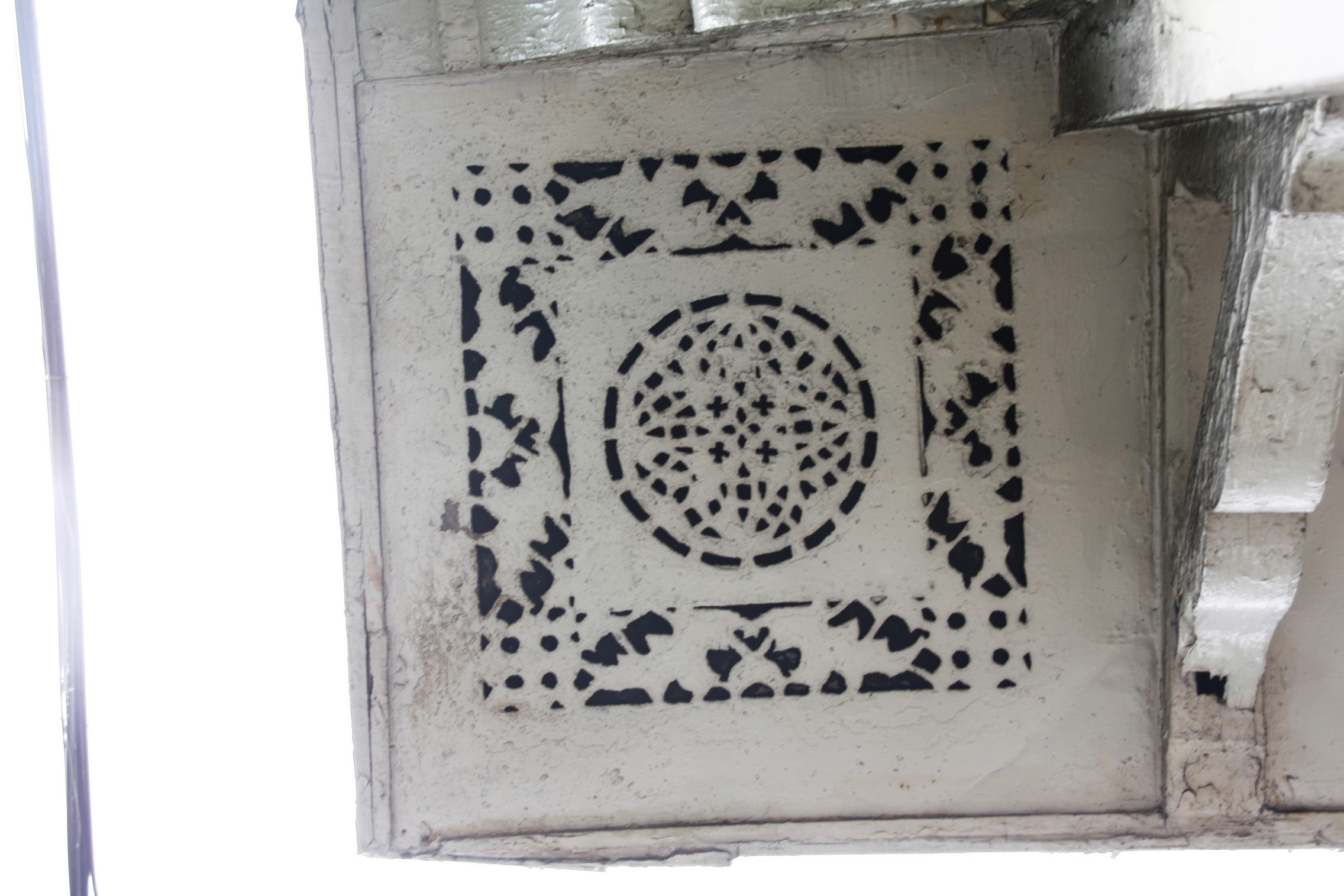
Details on the roof of the Romualdez Mansion

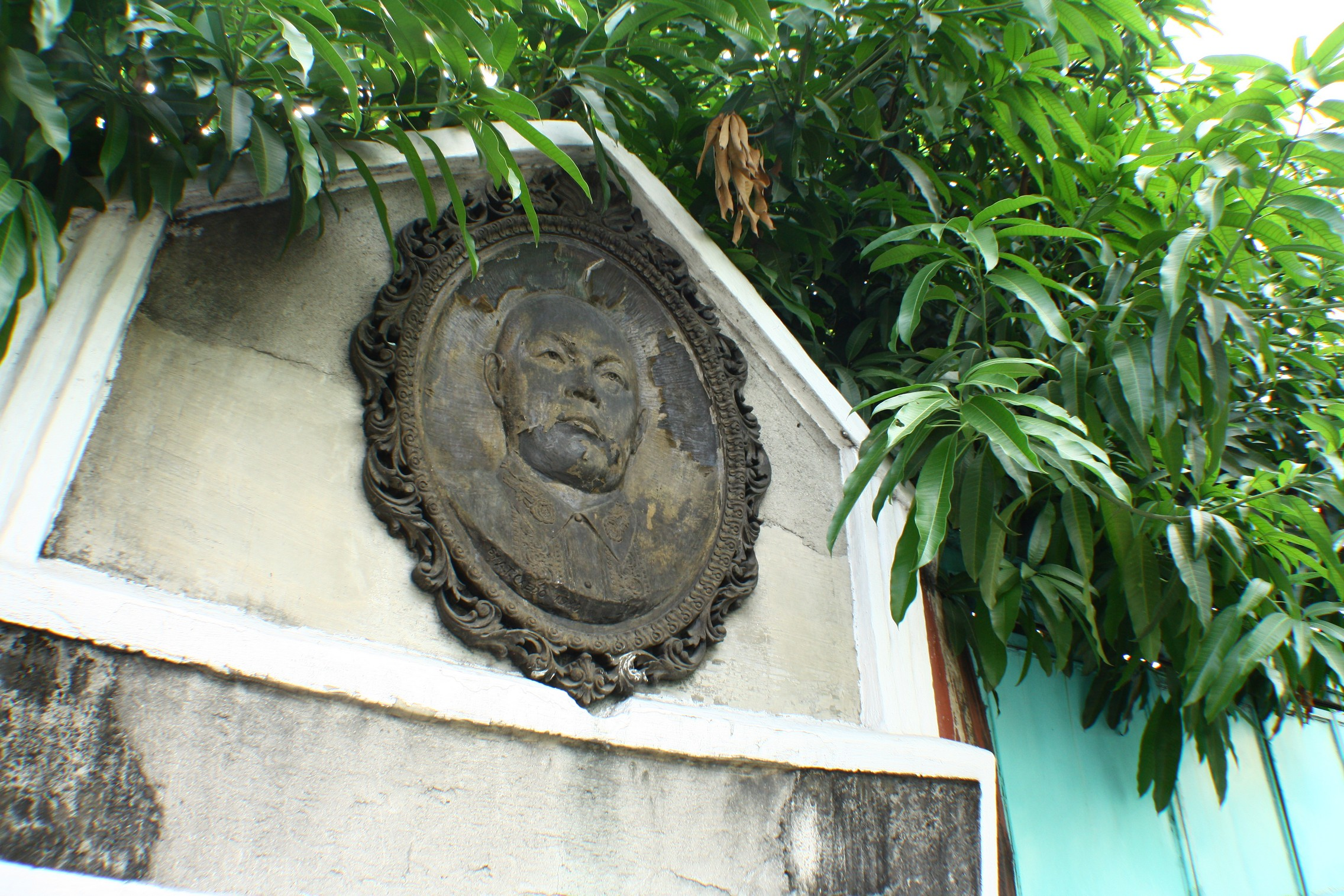
Close-up view of the Ladislao Bonus marker

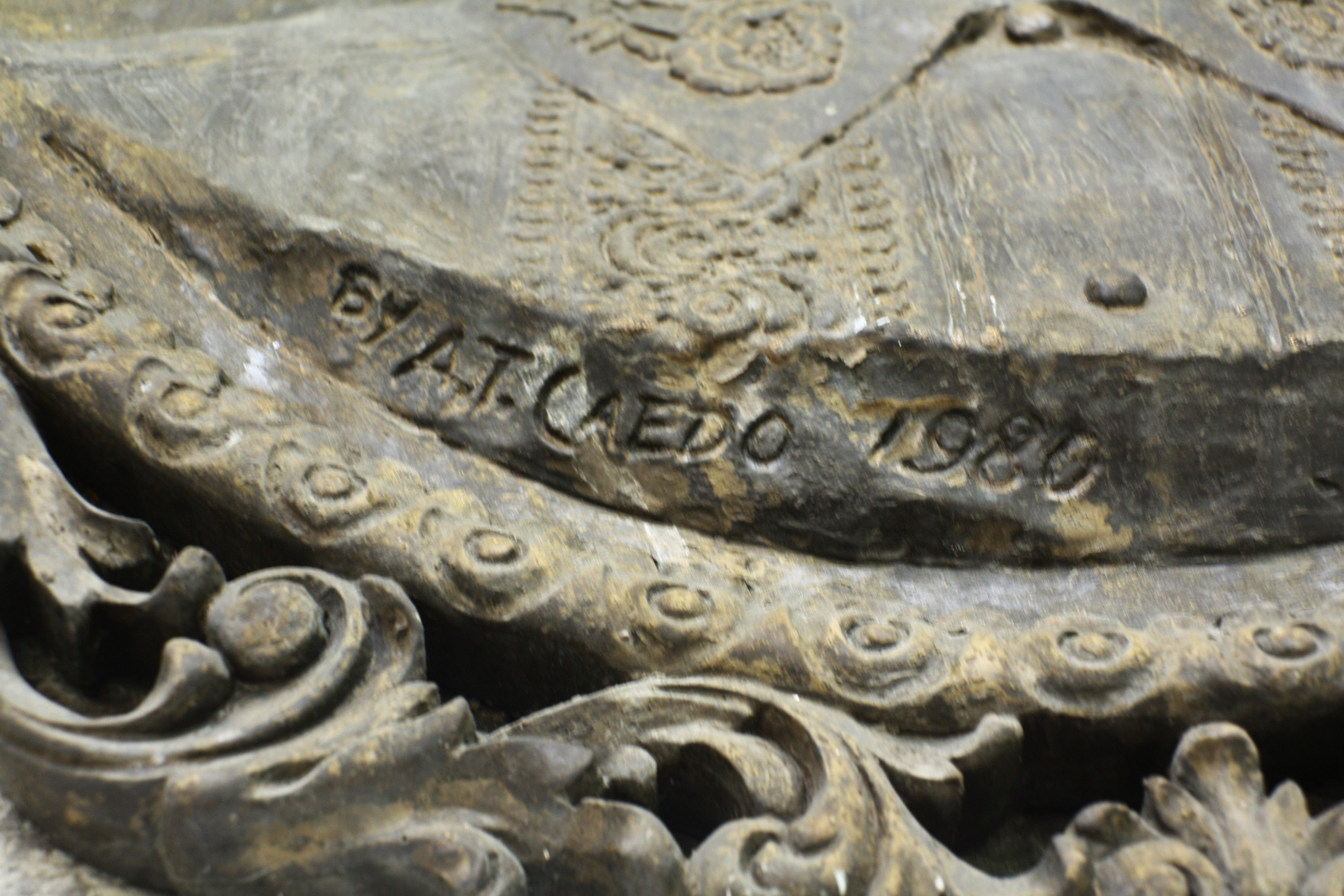
Relief of Ladislao Bonus signed by artist A. T. Caedo

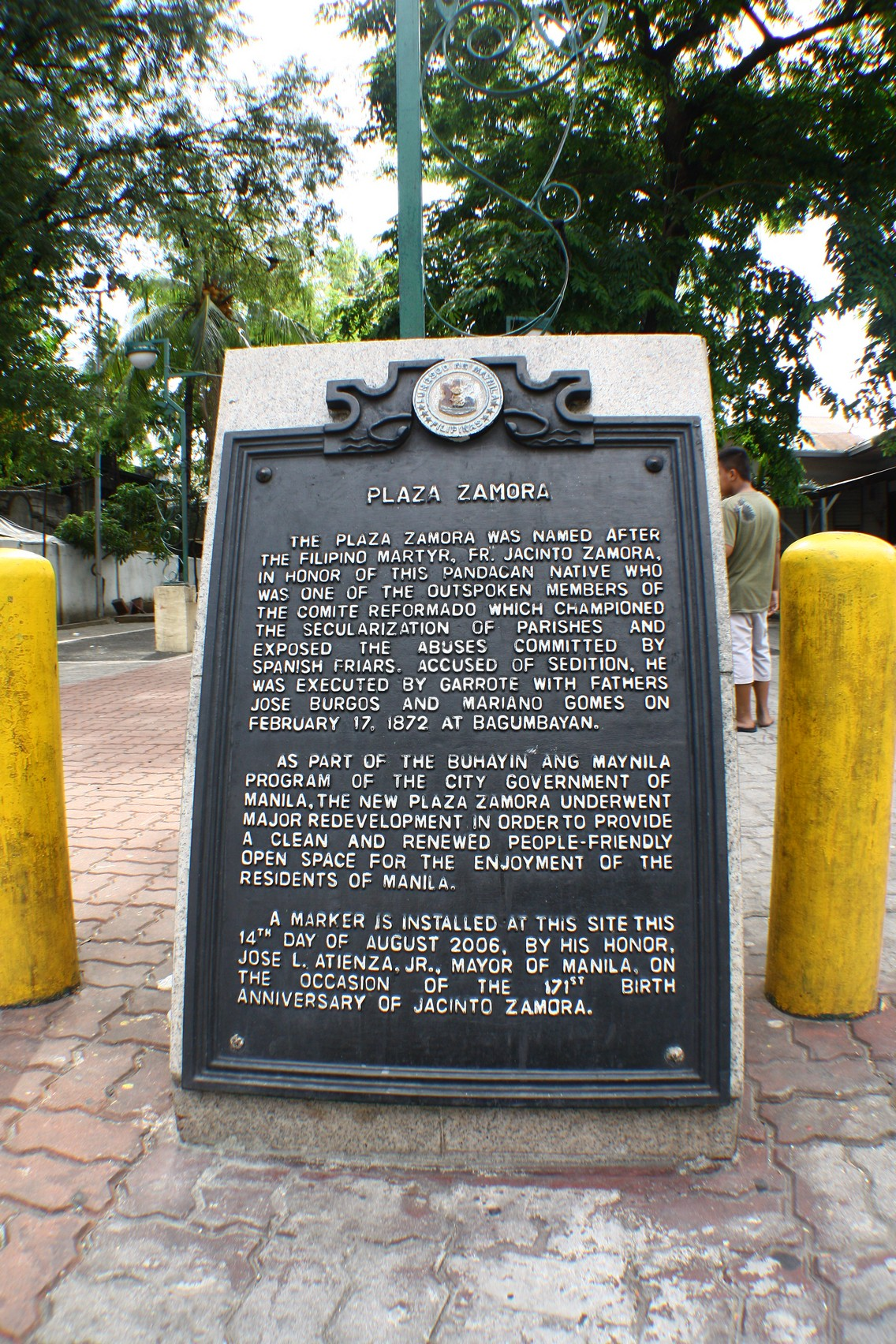
Close-up view of the Padre Zamora marker

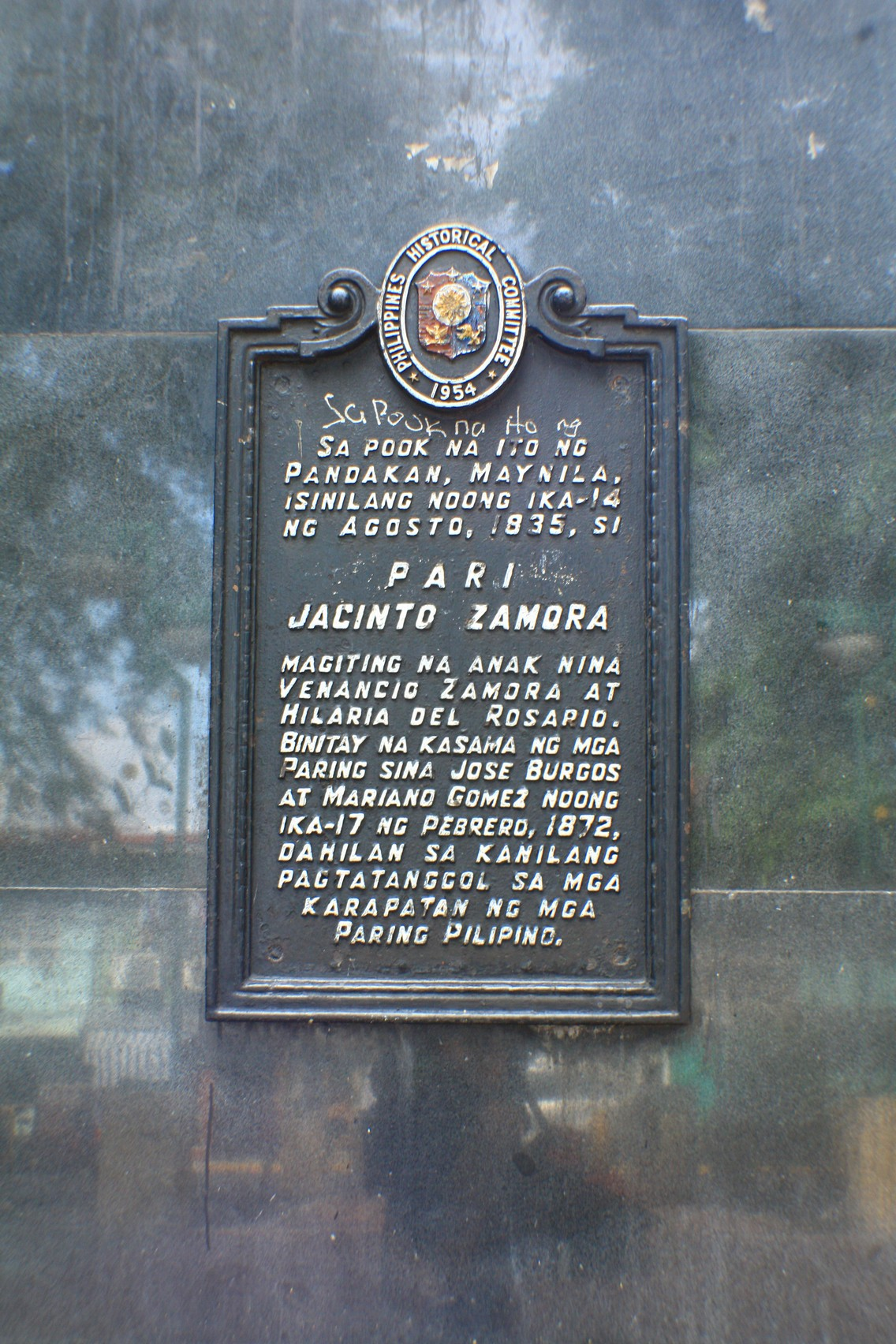
Full view of the Padre Zamora Historical marker

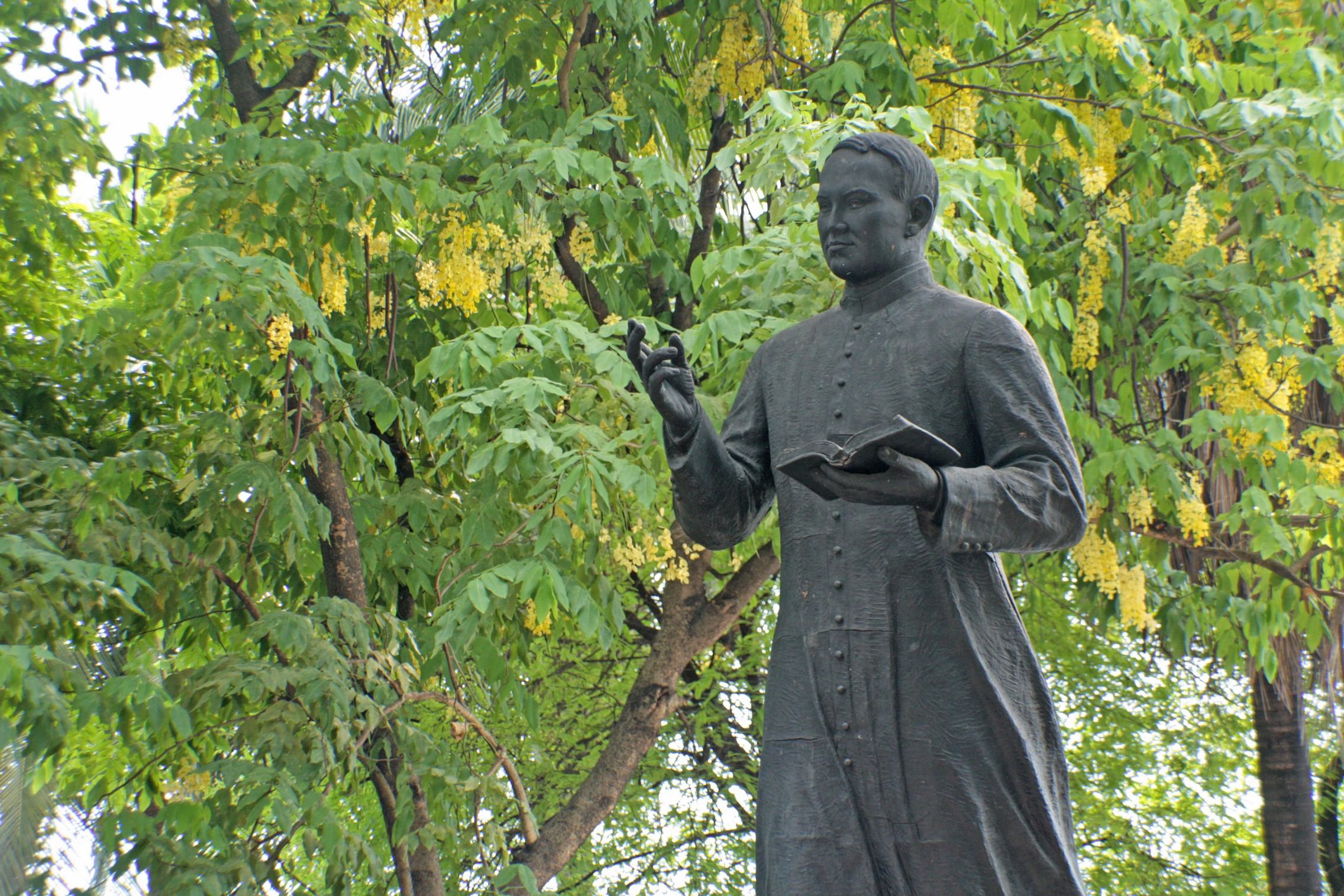
Statue of Padre Zamora

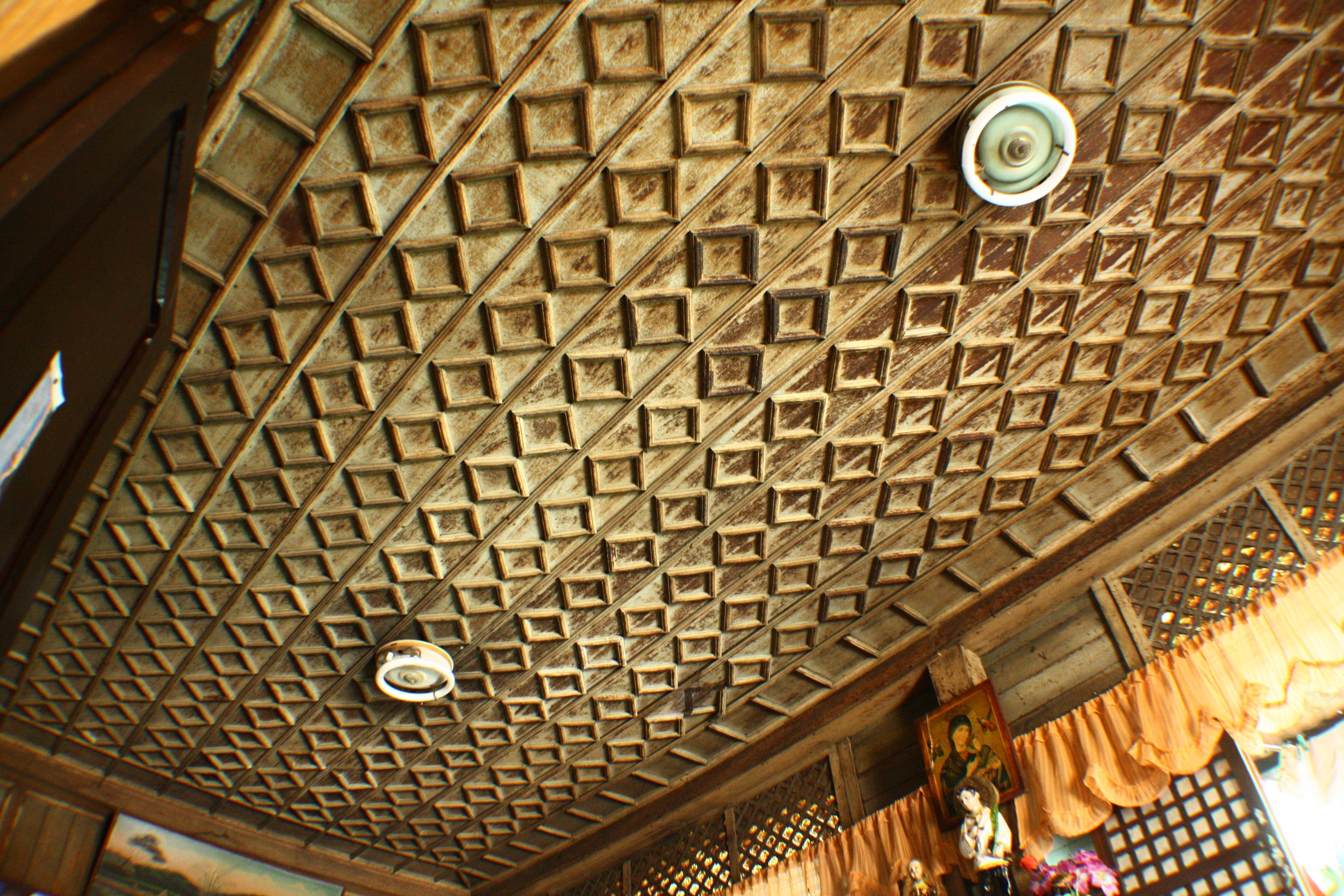
ceiling of the Garcia Ancestral House 1949

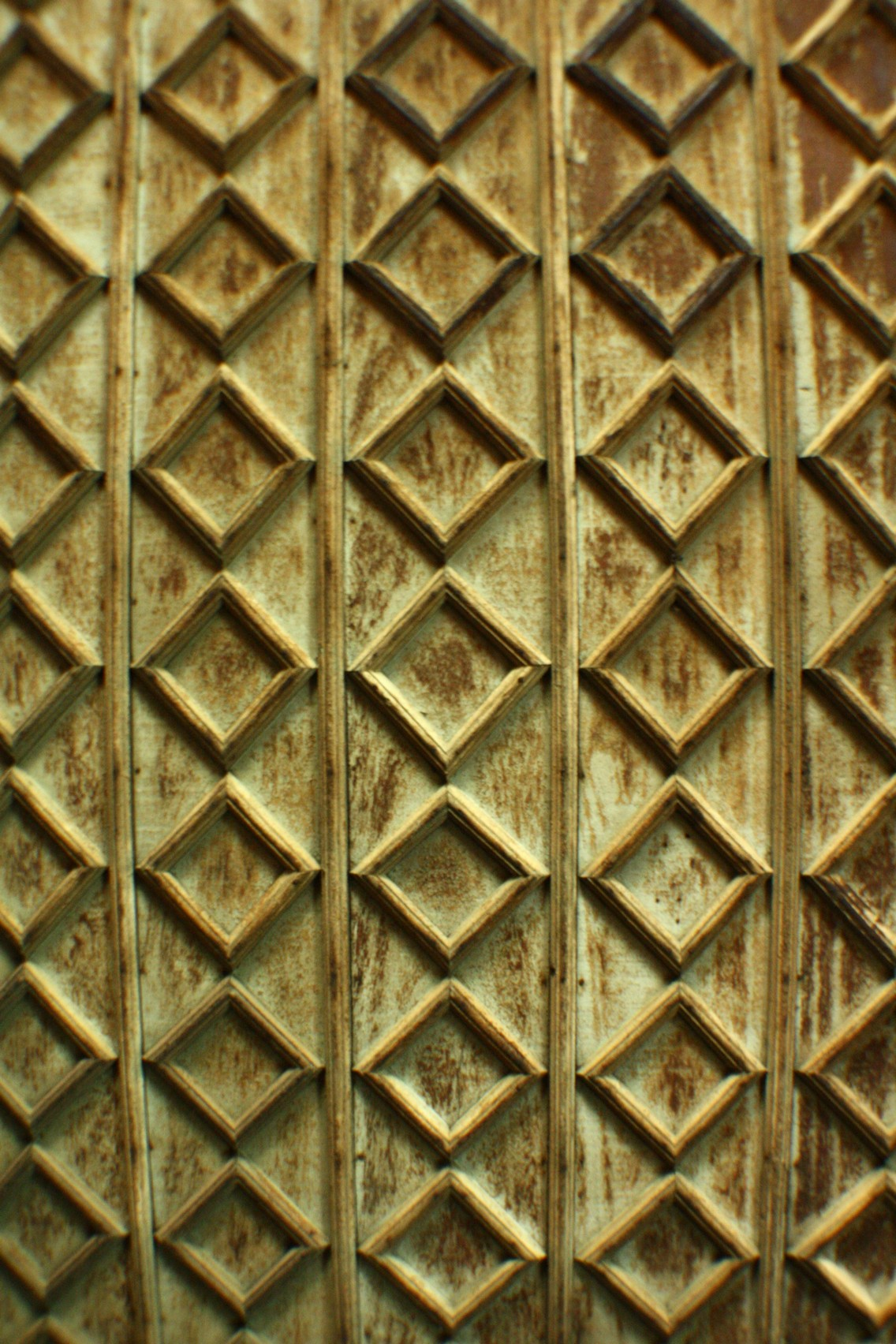
Close-up view of the ceiling of the Garcia Ancestral house 1949

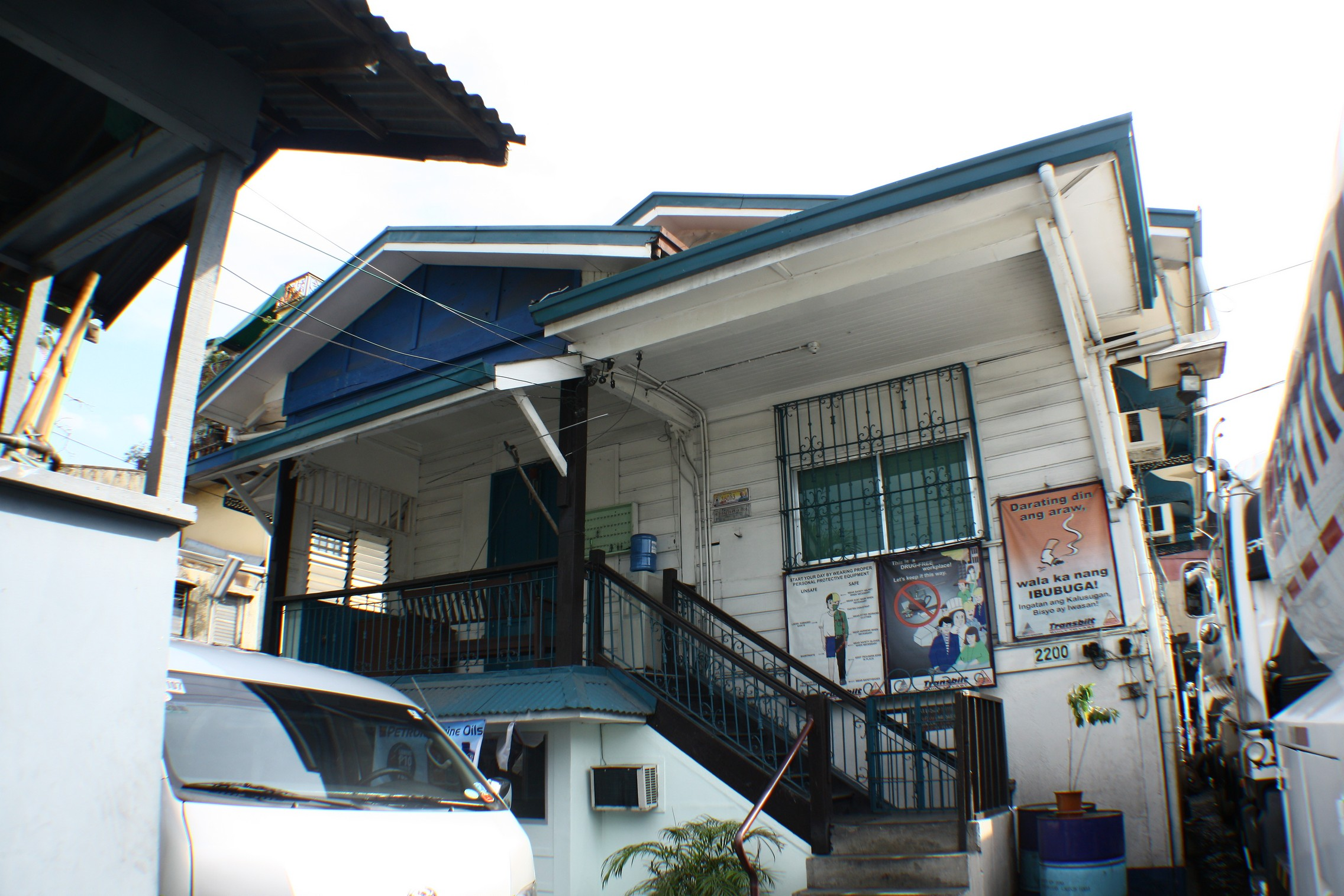
Undated house currently used as an office

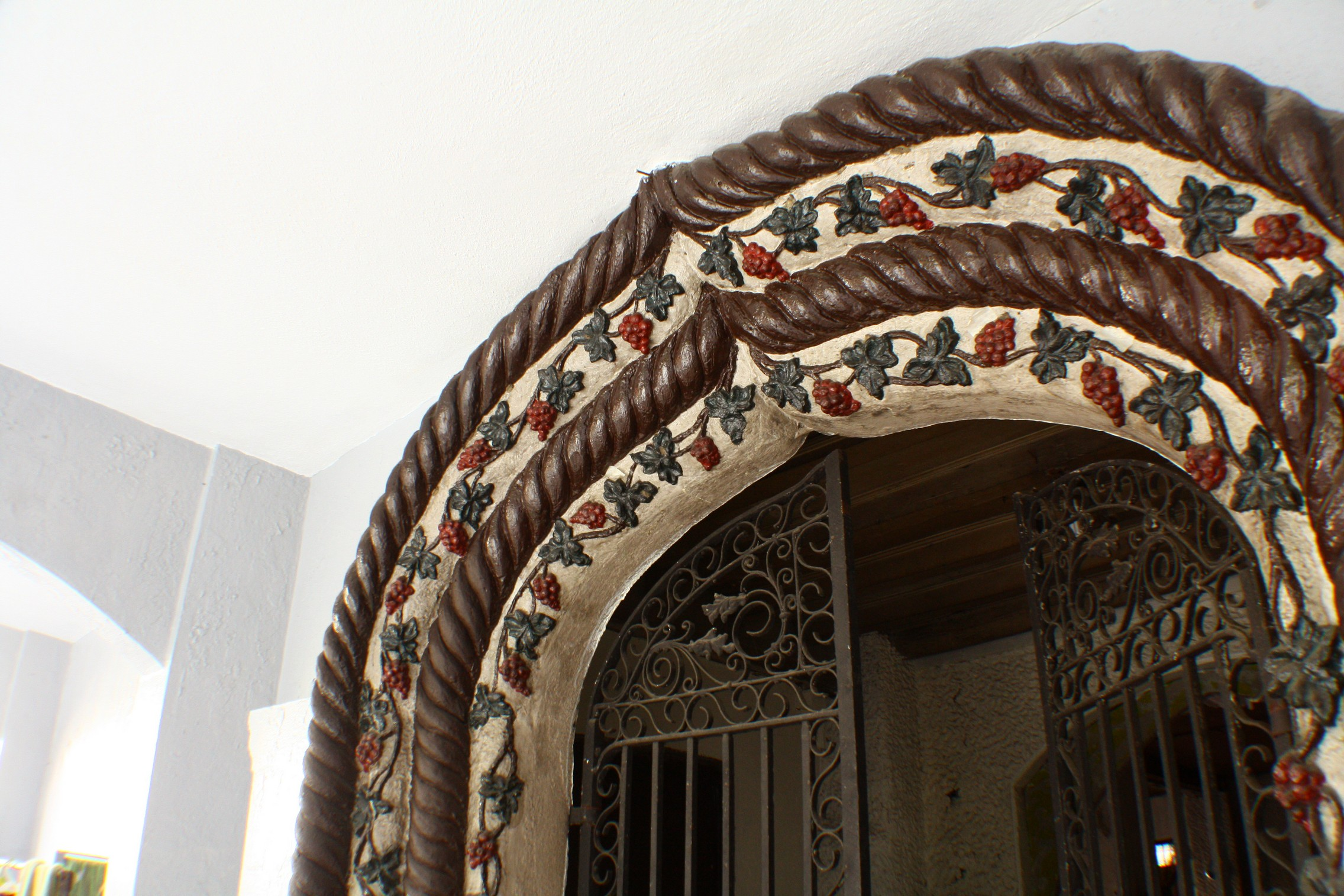
Decorative arch on the Thelmo house

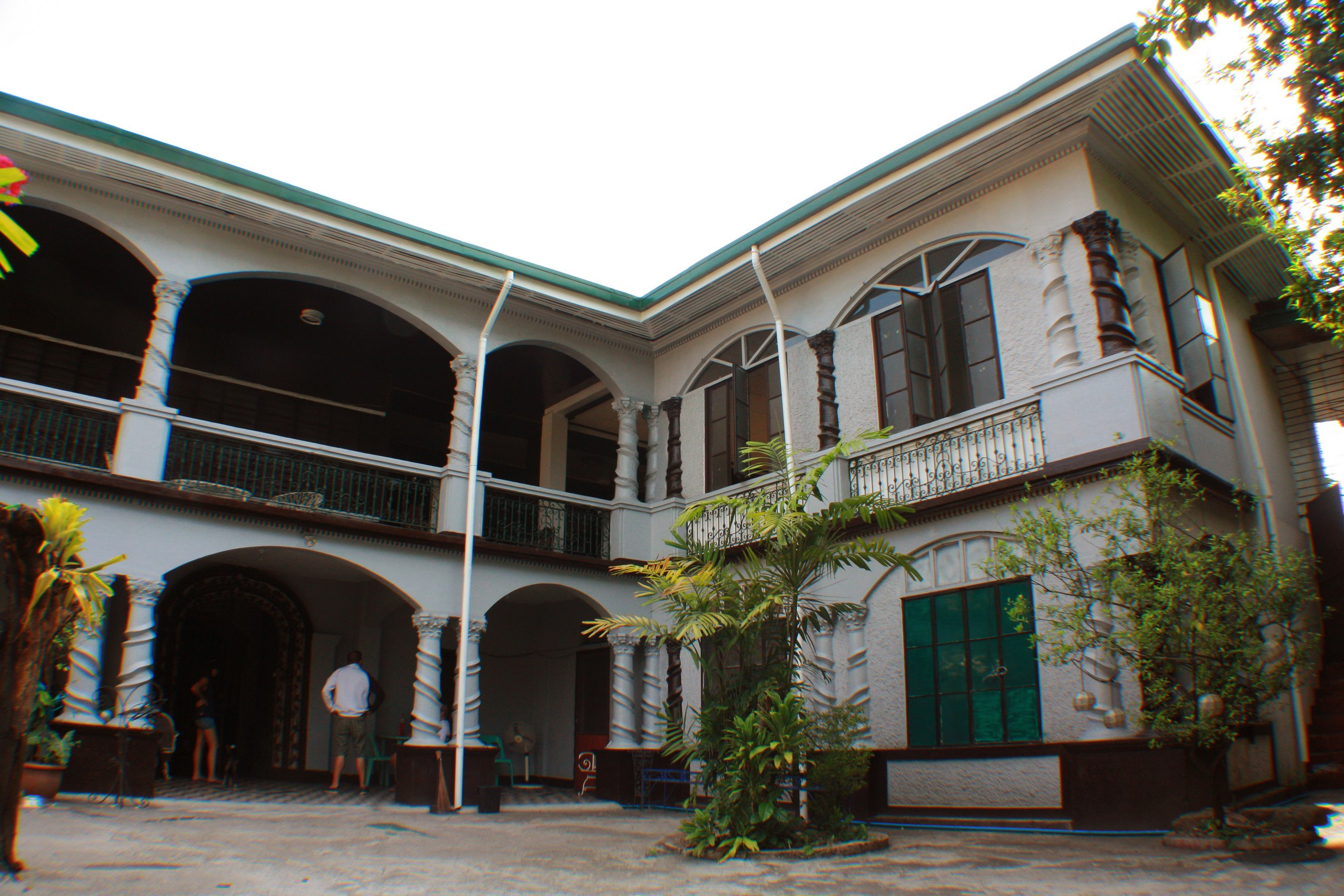
View of the Thelmo house from the garden

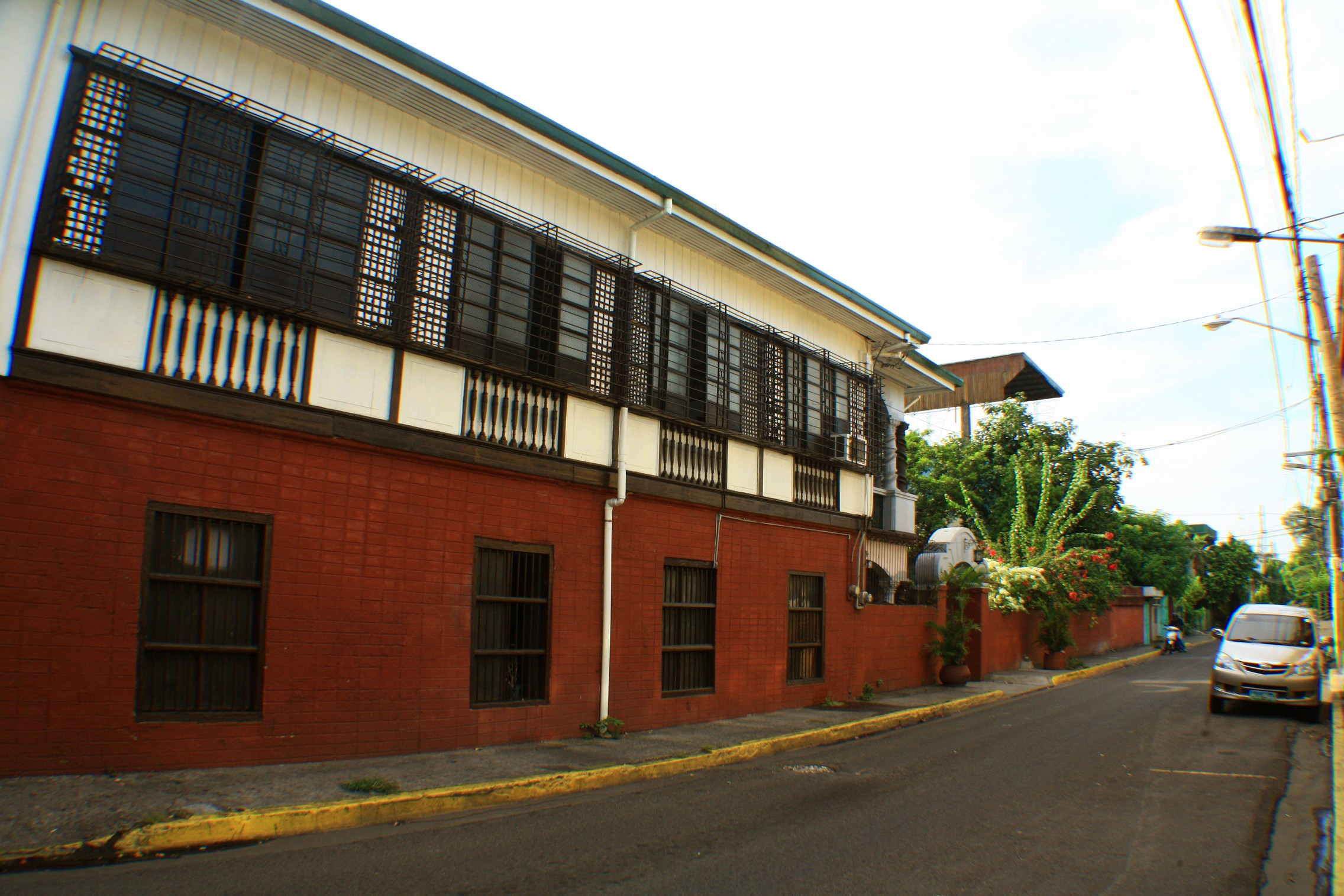
View of the Thelmo House from San Luis street

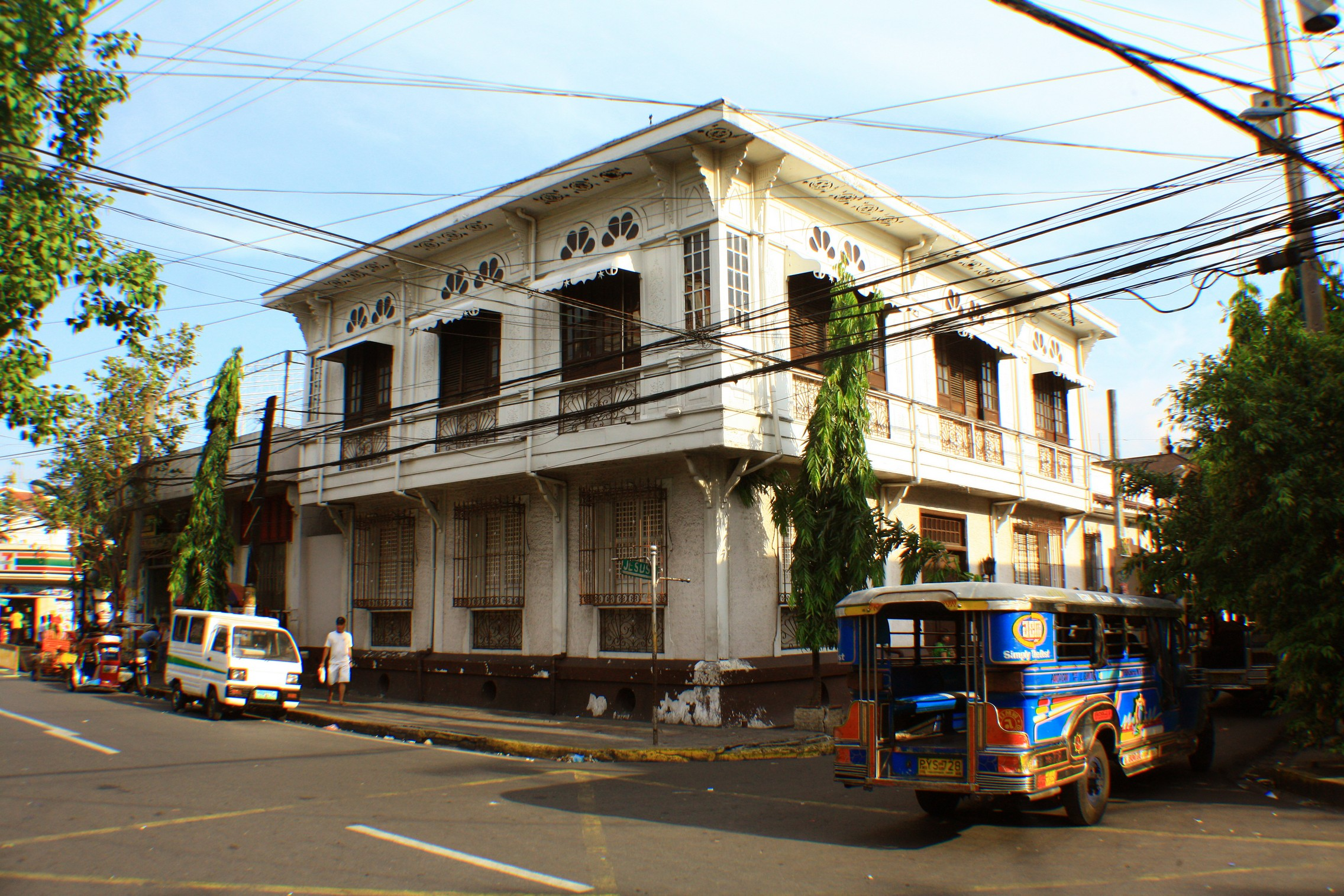
View of the Romualdez Mansion from Jesus street

== See also ==
- Tourism in Manila
