= St. Joseph's School – Pandacan =

Roman Catholic school in Manila, Philippines

St. Joseph's School - Pandacan

Location
- Jesus St. Pandacan, 1011; City of Manila, Metro Manila; Philippines; 14°35′34″N 121°00′16″E

Information
- Type: Run by the Archdiocese of Manila, Private, Filipino
- Motto: Go to St. Joseph to Serve God and Country.
- Established: 1955 in Feb. 17-18
- Director: Rev. Fr. Maxell Lowell C. Aranilla, Ph.D.
- Enrollment: approx. 500
- Language: English, Filipino
- Campus size: 4 hectares
- Color: Green/Gold
- Nickname: Josephian
- Affiliations: Roman Catholic Archdiocese of Manila, PAASCU
- Website: www.schoolaide.sjsp.edu.ph

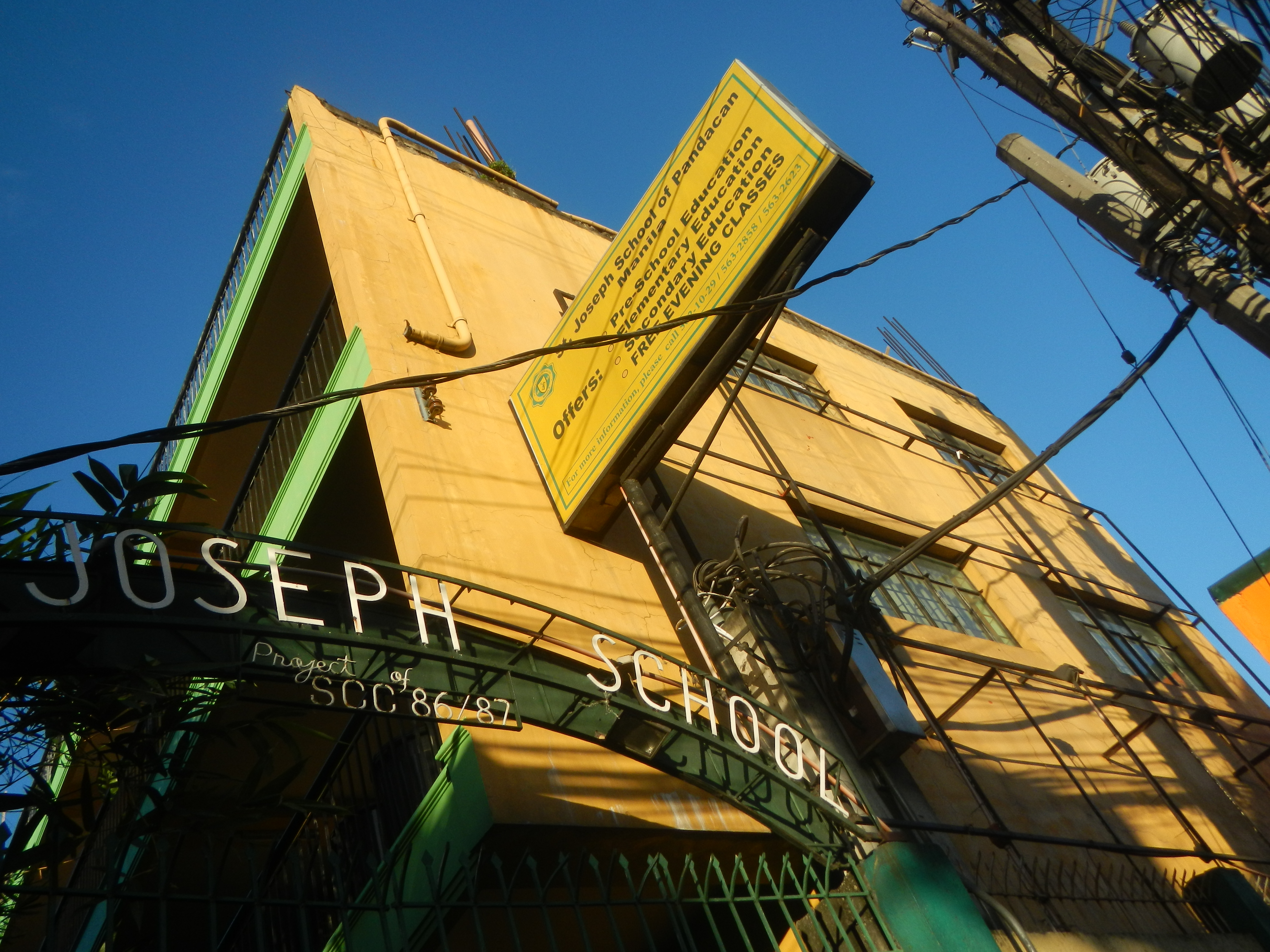
Gate

St. Joseph's School – Pandacan, Manila (SJSP) is a private parochial school operated by the Roman Catholic Archdiocese of Manila. It is located in the district of Pandacan in the City of Manila, Philippines, established by Cardinal Rufino Jiao Santos, D.D. in 1955 to provide a school that would enable the children of Pandacan and its neighboring towns an opportunity to receive good Roman Catholic oriented education.

== History of St. Joseph's School ==
The collaboration of Cardinal Rufino Jiao Santos, the Sisters of the Immaculate Heart of Mary (ICM), who were also planning to build a school in Pandacan, and Sto. Niño Parish Priest Guilermo Mendoza led to the establishment of St. Joseph's School's very first building at the adjacent vacant lot to the Sto. Niño Parish Church.

The school's first few years saw the rapid growth in the population of the school, and in 1959, under the direction of Sister Marie Alice Dieltiens, ICM, the school's first principal, a new building was built for the high school level, which would admit only female students.

The school's enrollment continued to grow, however, with some classes being held in makeshift classrooms in the Parish Office building. Thus, with the assistance of parents, the school was able to obtain a loan to build a new building. This annex to the high school building was blessed and opened on November 28, 1971, by Cardinal Santos with Bishop Bienvenido Lopez and Parish Priest Victor Serrano.

The ICM Sisters managed the school for a number of decades. In 1993, when the Sisters' charism and mission were changed, with a focus on deploying their sisters abroad, the ICM Sisters informed Cardinal Jaime Sin, Manila's Archbishop, of their intention to give up administering St. Joseph's School and turned over its management directly to the parish priest of Sto. Niño Parish.

In schoolyear 1994, after the introduction of a facilities improvement project to help elevate the conditions and teaching facilities of the school, the Sisters of the Missionary Apostles of Christ (MACE) were invited to help in the financial aspect of the administration of the school, as well handle areas of religious education. During the same year, the admission criteria were adjusted to accommodate male students in the high school department.

In 2002, the parish priest of the church gave up the directorship of the school to concentrate on parish work. Cardinal Archbishop of Manila Jaime Sin appointed Fr. Nolan A. Que, Ph.D., to the post of School Director. Long time St. Joseph teacher Emolyn G. Guamil was appointed Assistant Director in 2004, while Elizabeth D. Mendoza was appointed Institutional Principal the same year.

In schoolyear 2005-06, the school opened its multi-purpose gymnasium at what used to be the location of the elementary school chapel. The new gym serves as the main facility for the various physical education-related programs of the school. Also during this schoolyear, Fr. Que was given the task of supervising other schools nearby, including Paco Catholic School, St. Peter the Apostle School, Ermita Catholic School, Pius the X School, Malate Catholic School and as Assistant Director at St. Anthony School, Manila.

=== Directors of SJS from 1955 to present ===
- Guillermo Mendoza - 1955 to 1970
- Victorino Serrano - 1970 to 1986
- Felipe Ocol - 1986 to December 1988
- Manny Sebastian - January 1989 to March 1989
- Severino O. Lorica - April 1989 to June 2002
- Nolan A. Que, PhD - July 2002 to June 2014
- Maxell Lowell C. Aranilla June 2014 to Present

=== Principals of SJS from 1955 to present ===
==== Institutional ====
- Elizabeth D. Mendoza - 2005 to 2008
- Leonora T. Brazil - 2008 to 2010
- Fr. Nolan A. Que - 2010 to 2014

==== Elementary Department ====
- Marie Alice Dieltiens, ICM - 1956 to 1967(also as an Administrator)
- Marina Picardal, ICM - 1965 to 1967
- Susana Belardo, ICM - 1967 to 1968
- Gloria Ymson, ICM - 1968 to 1969
- Purisima Pe, ICM - 1969 to 1970
- Lourdes Velasco, ICM - 1970 to 1977(also an Administrator during 1978 to 1993)
- Jovita Blanco - 1977 to 1987
- Adelia Jambalos - 1987 to 1990
- Elizabeth D. Mendoza - 1990 to 2008
- Leonora T. Brazilian - 2008 to 2010
- Elizabeth B. Inocillas - 2010 to Present

==== High School Department ====
- Estrella Ache - 1958 to 1959
- Inocencia De La Costa, ICM - 1960 to 1962
- Corazon Mendiola, ICM - 1962 to 1963 (High School)
- Montserrat Agcaoili, ICM - 1963 to 1971 (also an Administrator from 1967 to 1970)
- Estrella Ache, ICM - 1971-1972
- Cleof Bacon, ICM - 1973 to 1975
- Neriza Reyes - 1975 to 1986
- Emolyn Guamil - 1986 to 2004 (Assistant Director effective 2005)
- Ofelia S. Meneses
- Ofelia Mampusti
- Tanya P. Namit
- Dina Abariso
- Paolo Quiñones - 2020 to present

== School Logo, Hymn & Newspaper ==
=== School Logo ===
The logo of Saint Joseph's School is derived from its patron saint, Saint Joseph the Worker. Its symbols represent the following:

- The white lily symbolizes holiness and purity;
- The carpenter's saw signifies habitual diligence and hard work;
- The shield manifests protection and defense against evil.

The school aims to form the students according to the likeness of Saint Joseph. The three symbols in the logo aptly convey Saint Joseph's main character: pure, holy, and just; hardworking; and protector and defender against evil and harm.

=== School hymn (in Tagalog) ===
"San Jose"

Ikaw ang aming paaralan, San Jose tunay naming mahal. Aming tagumpay sa iyo iaalay, Kahit aming abang buhay.

San Jose mahal ka namin pagka't sa yo' kami hinabilin.

Natamong karunungan sa yo' galing, Na naging tanglaw namin sa dilim. At kung kami'y nasa tagumpay na, Lagi ka naming maaalala, gintong aral na aming nakuha mananatiling lantay at maganda.

San Jose, San Jose, Sadya ka ngang walang kapara. Kaya't diwa nami't dibdib, Ang sigaw... "Mabuhay Ka!"

—Lyrics by Gilda Bonacruz and Prof. S. Imperio; music by Prof. S. Imperio
