= Pandacan =

District of Manila, Metro Manila, Philippines

Coordinates: 14.594°N 121.007°E

- District of Manila
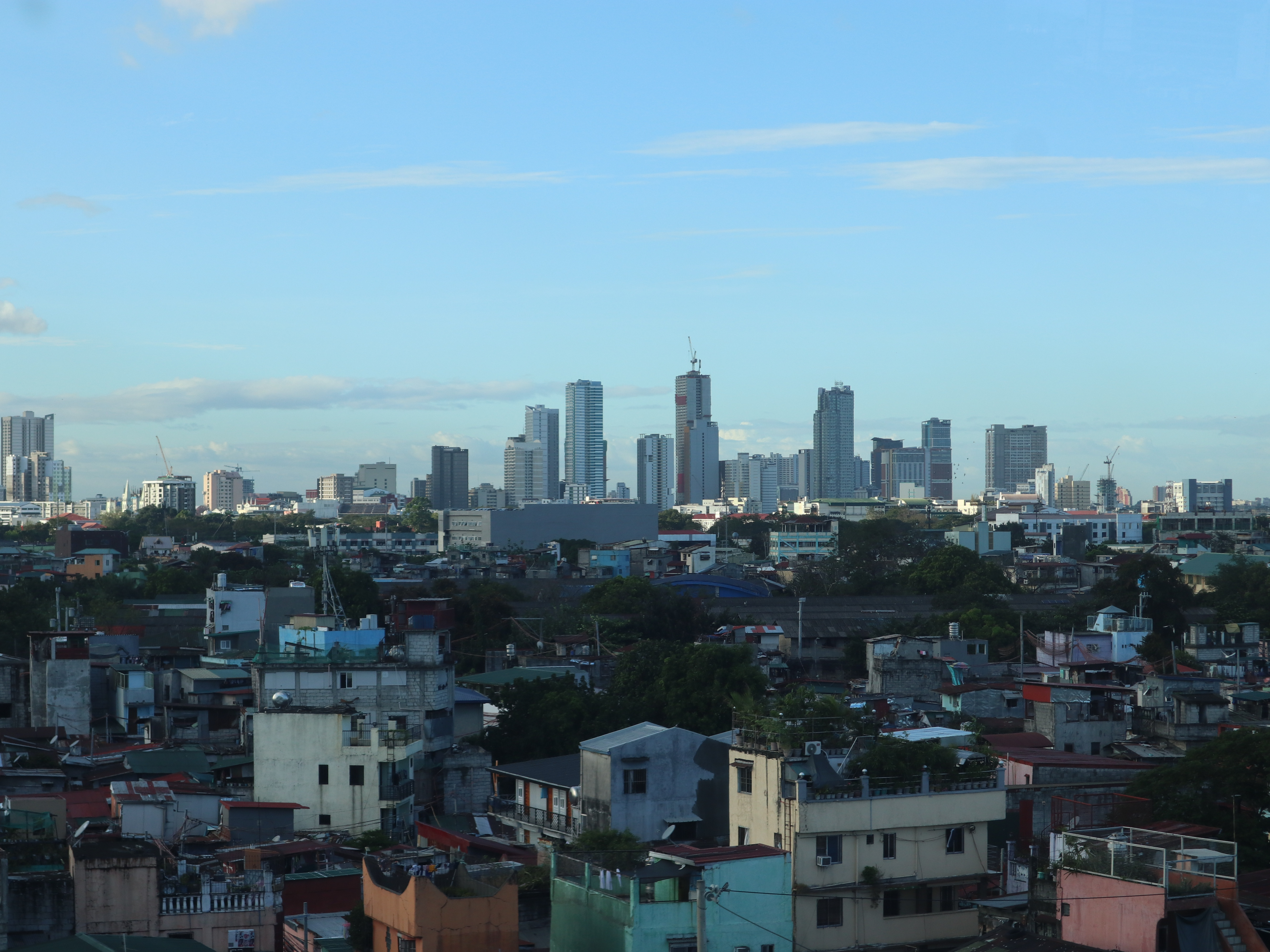
- Pandacan skyline in 2023

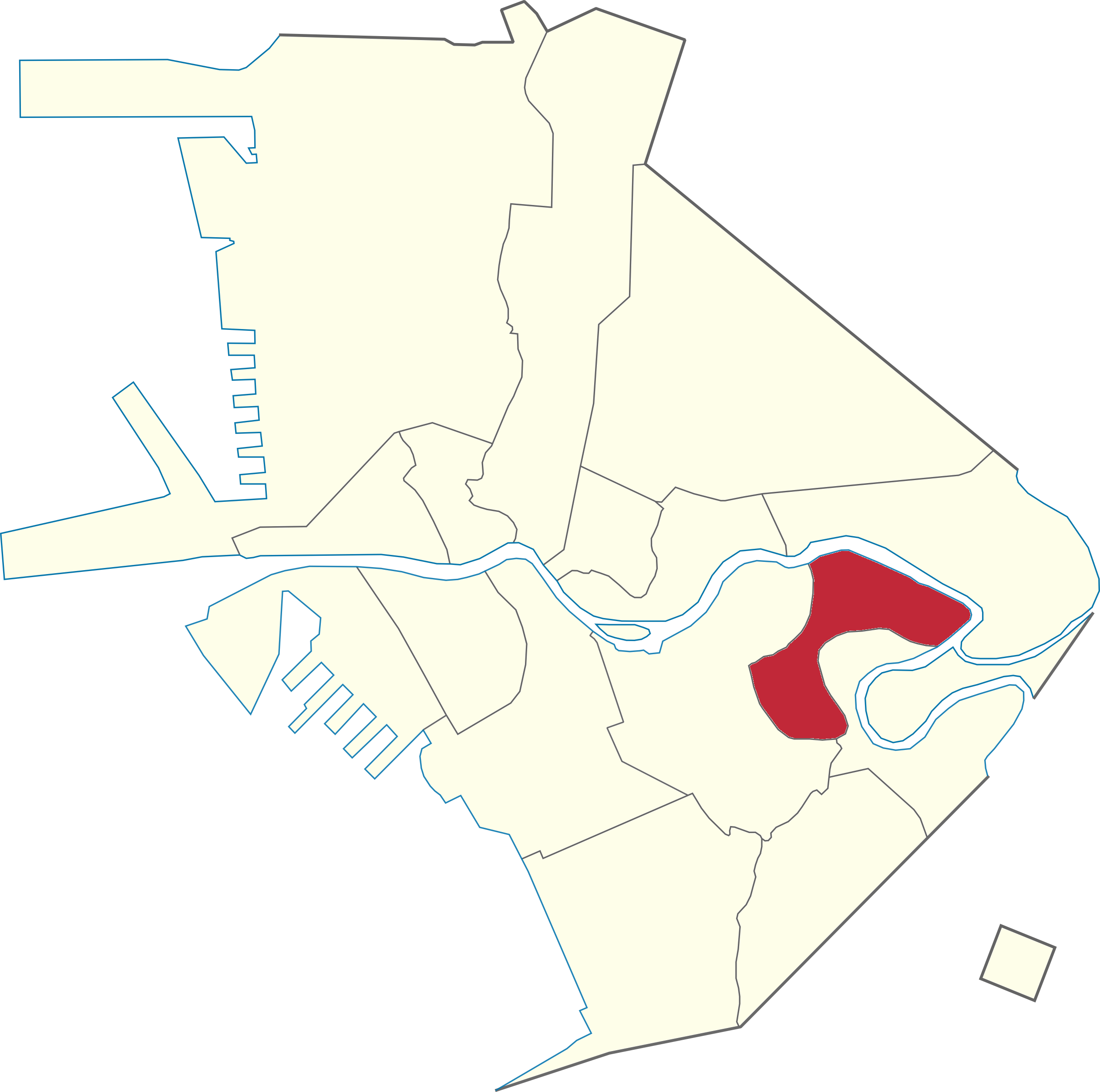
- Country: Philippines
- Region: National Capital Region
- City: Manila
- Congressional districts: Part of the 6th district of Manila
- Barangays: 38

Area
  - Total: 1.66 km^{2} (0.64 sq mi)

Population (2020)
  - Total: 84,769
  - Density: 51,100/km^{2} (132,000/sq mi)
- Time zone: UTC+08:00 (Philippine Standard Time)
- Zip codes: 1011
- Area codes: 02

Pandacan is a district in Manila, Philippines, which is known in recent history as the former site of the Pandacan Oil Depot which supplied the majority of oil exports in the country.

== Etymology ==
Pandacan is a corrupted term derived from its older designation, Pandanan. The name is rooted in the word pandan (Pandanus amaryllifolius), referencing a tree that was once abundant in the area.

== Profile ==
In 2020, Pandacan had a total population of 84,769. The original residents of the district were Tagalog migrants from the province of Bulacan. When the district grew and progressed as a manufacturing center for Manila, several ethnic groups from other parts of the country migrated into the district after the Second World War.

The district is bounded to the north and northeast by the Pasig River, the Estero de Pandacan to the west and south and the district of Santa Ana to the southeast.

Socioeconomically, the majority of the residents of Pandacan range from lower- to upper-middle class. Original residents are gainfully employed as blue-collar workers in the nearby factories and oil depots, while those in the service sector are generally employed in nearby Makati, the country's central business district.

Pandacan was originally established as the industrial center for the city of Manila during the turn of the 20th century. Oil depots which service more than half of the fuel requirement of the country were established along the banks of the Pasig River in the district.

== Barangays ==
Zones

- Zone 91: Barangays 833 to 840
- Zone 92: Barangays 841 to 848
- Zone 93: Barangays 849 to 859
- Zone 94: Barangays 860 to 865
- Zone 95: Barangays 867 to 872

Barangays

Barangay	Land area (km^{2})	Population (2020 census)
Zone 91
Barangay 833	0.06385 km^{2}	1,504
Barangay 834	0.2786 km^{2}	1,733
Barangay 835	0.09306 km^{2}	2,706
Barangay 836	0.04999 km^{2}	5,317
Barangay 837	0.06437 km^{2}	3,039
Barangay 838	0.04986 km^{2}	2,969
Barangay 839	0.09567 km^{2}	2,007
Barangay 840	0.02656 km^{2}	2,541
Zone 92
Barangay 841	0.04135 km^{2}	2,250
Barangay 842	0.03160 km^{2}	2,812
Barangay 843	0.02849 km^{2}	8,744
Barangay 844	0.03332 km^{2}	3,500
Barangay 845	0.01743 km^{2}	1,309
Barangay 846	0.01389 km^{2}	1,848
Barangay 847	0.04071 km^{2}	2,883
Barangay 848	0.04114 km^{2}	1,586
Zone 93
Barangay 849	0.01205 km^{2}	1,849
Barangay 850	0.01176 km^{2}	2,456
Barangay 851	0.02360 km^{2}	1,052
Barangay 852	0.008810 km^{2}	1,118
Barangay 853	0.007320 km^{2}	505
Barangay 855	0.04422 km^{2}	2,142
Barangay 856	0.03971 km^{2}	1,611
Barangay 857	0.01500 km^{2}	1,894
Barangay 858	0.01477 km^{2}	665
Barangay 859	0.03437 km^{2}	1,355
Zone 94
Barangay 860	0.01857 km^{2}	3,214
Barangay 861	0.2062 km^{2}	1,072
Barangay 862	0.04347 km^{2}	2,419
Barangay 863	0.03479 km^{2}	1,481
Barangay 864	0.01977 km^{2}	813
Barangay 865	0.1867 km^{2}	79
Zone 95
Barangay 867	0.03001 km^{2}	2,116
Barangay 868	0.01848 km^{2}	2,850
Barangay 869	0.02494 km^{2}	2,010
Barangay 870	0.02373 km^{2}	3,049
Barangay 871	0.01273 km^{2}	2,407
Barangay 872	0.02407 km^{2}	1,864

== Landmarks ==
=== Churches ===
Four of the leading Christian religious dominations in the Philippines established their presence in the district. For Roman Catholics, there is the Santo Niño Parish along Jesus Street. The Iglesia ni Cristo and the United Methodist Church both have a church along Quirino Avenue, and the Philippine Independent Church has a church (Parish of Sto. Niño) at the corner of Central and Labores Streets.

=== Romualdez House ===
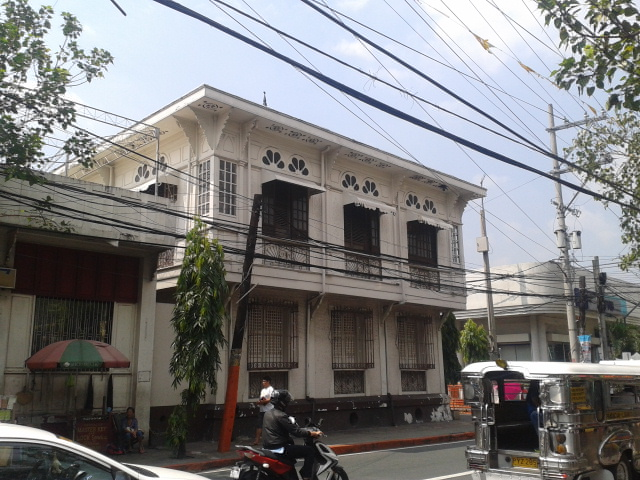
Romualdez Ancestral House

Former First Lady Imelda Romualdez Marcos claims Pandacan as her ancestral home in Manila. Since marrying former President Ferdinand Marcos in the 1960s, caretakers have been constantly maintaining her home. The house is Marcos' tie as a resident of Manila, despite her family's roots in Leyte province in the Visayas.

=== Schools ===
Public elementary schools serving the district includes Jacinto Zamora Elementary School, Bagong Diwa Elementary School, Beata Elementary School and Bagong Barangay Elementary School; the district has one public high school, the Carlos P. Garcia High School.

Private education is provided by a Catholic school called St. Joseph's School – Pandacan, located beside the Santo Niño Parish along Jesus Street.

In 1994, the ERDA Technical And Vocational Secondary School was built by Fr. Pierre Tritz, a Jesuit from France for the disadvantaged Filipino youth.

== History ==
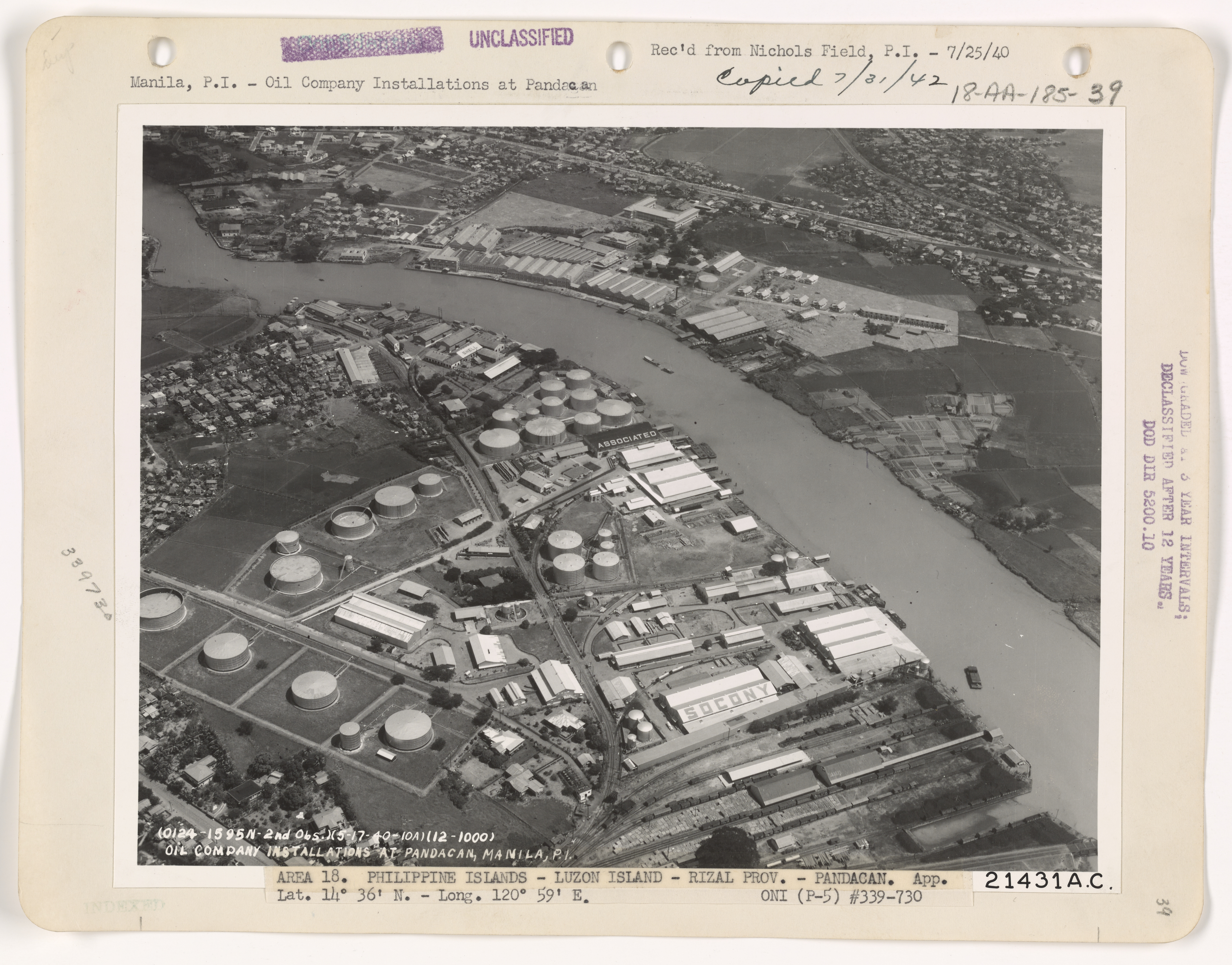
Aerial view of the Pandacan oil depot, 1940

Officially, Pandacan was established as a community in 1574 when Franciscan priests of the Roman Catholic Church established the first mission in the district. Pandacan was originally part of the parish of Sampaloc; it was later established as a separate parish in 1712.

Pandacan was a farming community, producing small quantities of rice and sugar that were sold to the Spanish enclave in Intramuros. Aside from a few vegetable plots, the old Pandacan produced bricks and tiles, colored cotton laces but in limited quantities. The district also produced shoes and small boats.

In the 19th century, Pandacan was described as a "Little Venice" or "Little Italy" for its numerous canals or estuaries leading to the Pasig River. Many would leisurely row through the estuaries in the late afternoons as described by Francisco Balagtas in his early writings. Pandacan was home to balladeers and a source of musicians in the early times.

Late in the Spanish era and into the American regime, Pandacan was developed into becoming the first industrial estate in the Philippines. The first modern manufacturing company was built in Pandacan and was called the Compañia General de Tabacos de Filipinas in 1882, a modern cigar-making plant.

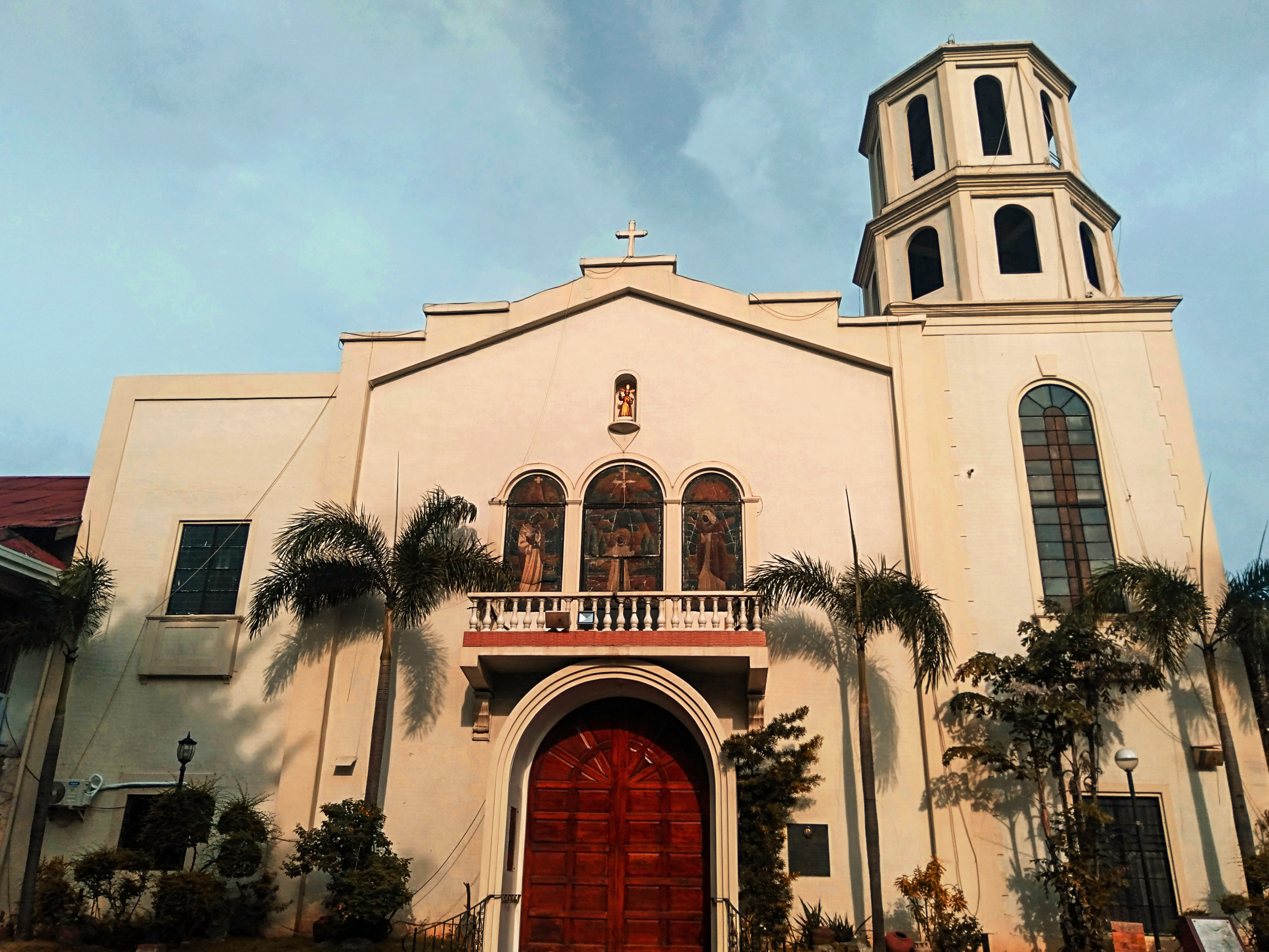
The Santo Niño de Pandacan Parish Church (prior to the 2020 fire)

The first stone church in Pandacan was built in 1732 by Father Francisco del Rosario. It was completed in 1760 but was destroyed twice by earthquakes. A modern church stood on the ruins including a parish school which stands on what was the Catholic cemetery of the district. The church was destroyed by fire on July 10, 2020.

Pandacan was home to prominent Filipino artists of the 19th century, including Francisco Baltazar (also known as Balagtas) who authored Florante at Laura; musician Ladislao Bonus; Tagalog language theorist Lope K. Santos; and playwrights Miguel Masilungan and Pantaleon Lopez.

By the turn of the 19th century, the American colonial government decreed Pandacan as the center for industrial activity and had oil companies build their storage and distribution facilities in the district.

With the presence of several manufacturing facilities in the district, a modern housing facility was built to house the workers at the nearby oil depots. The housing project was called "Kapitan Tikong" (Captain Tikong) subdivision, named after a popular local leader. The housing facility was built on the southeastern banks of the Estero de Beata. In honor of Francisco Baltazar, the streets in the subdivision were named after the characters of Florante at Laura.

== Modernization ==
=== From industrial to commercial ===
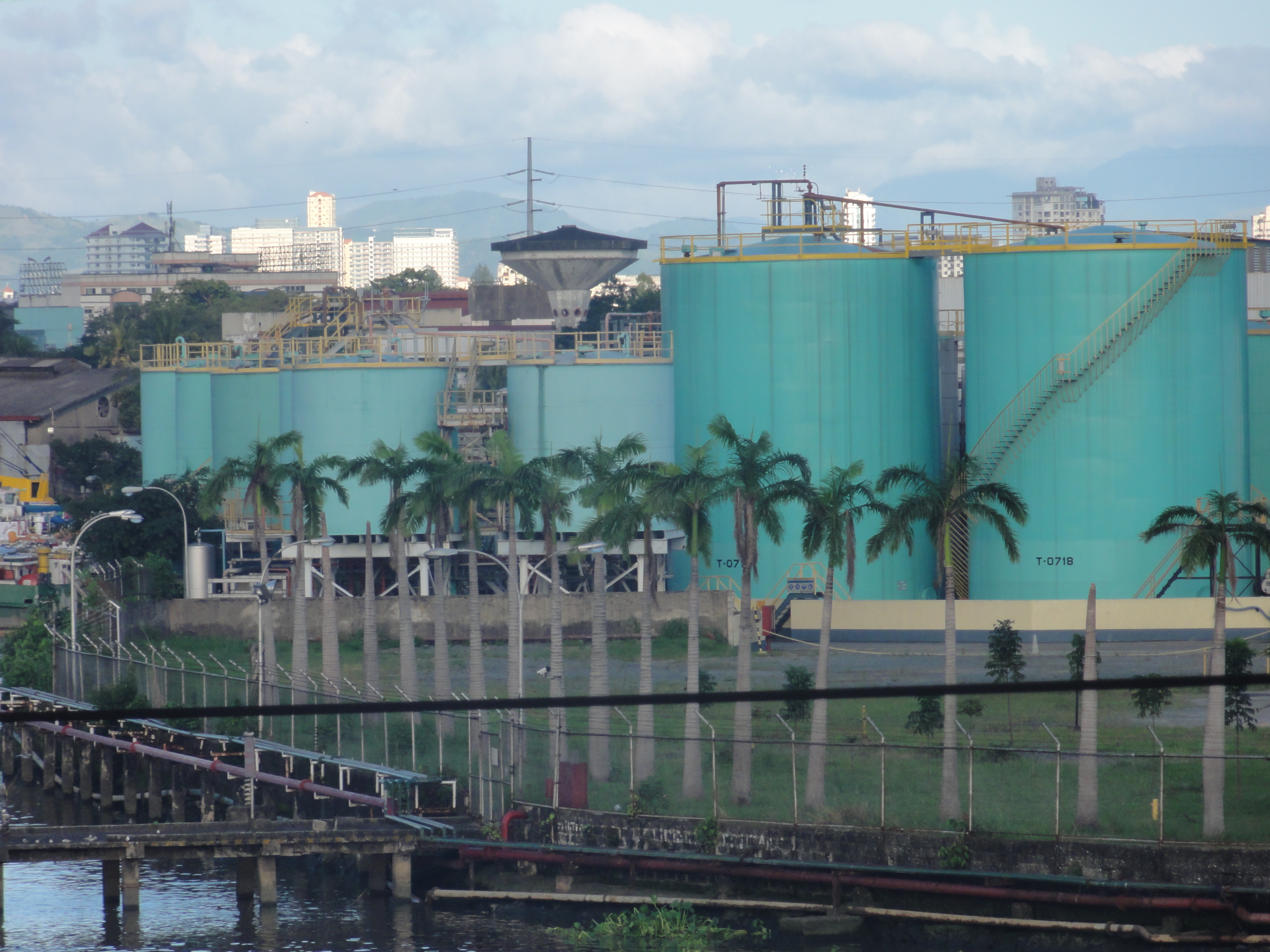
The former Pandacan Oil Depot

The manufacturing facilities in Pandacan have long transferred to other locations outside of Manila. Only the major "Big Three" oil companies operate oil distribution depots in Pandacan: Royal Dutch Shell, Chevron's Caltex and San Miguel Energy Corp. majority-owned Petron Philippines.

During his second term, Manila Mayor Lito Atienza led an effort to convert Pandacan from an industrial classification into commercial, in an effort to have the oil depot removed from the district. Atienza and several city councilors were concerned that the oil depot served as a security, environment, and safety hazard to the densely populated Pandacan. Several fires have been attributed to the presence of the oil depot and terrorist attacks were a major concern.

Difficulty in finding a reasonable relocation site for the depots, without disturbing the national distribution process of fuel, resulted in a compromise in place of the eviction. However, a gradual phase out of large oil tanks that lined residential areas has been completed and a Pandacan Linear Park was built along the oil depot and residential units up to the banks of the Pasig River.

=== Beautification programs ===
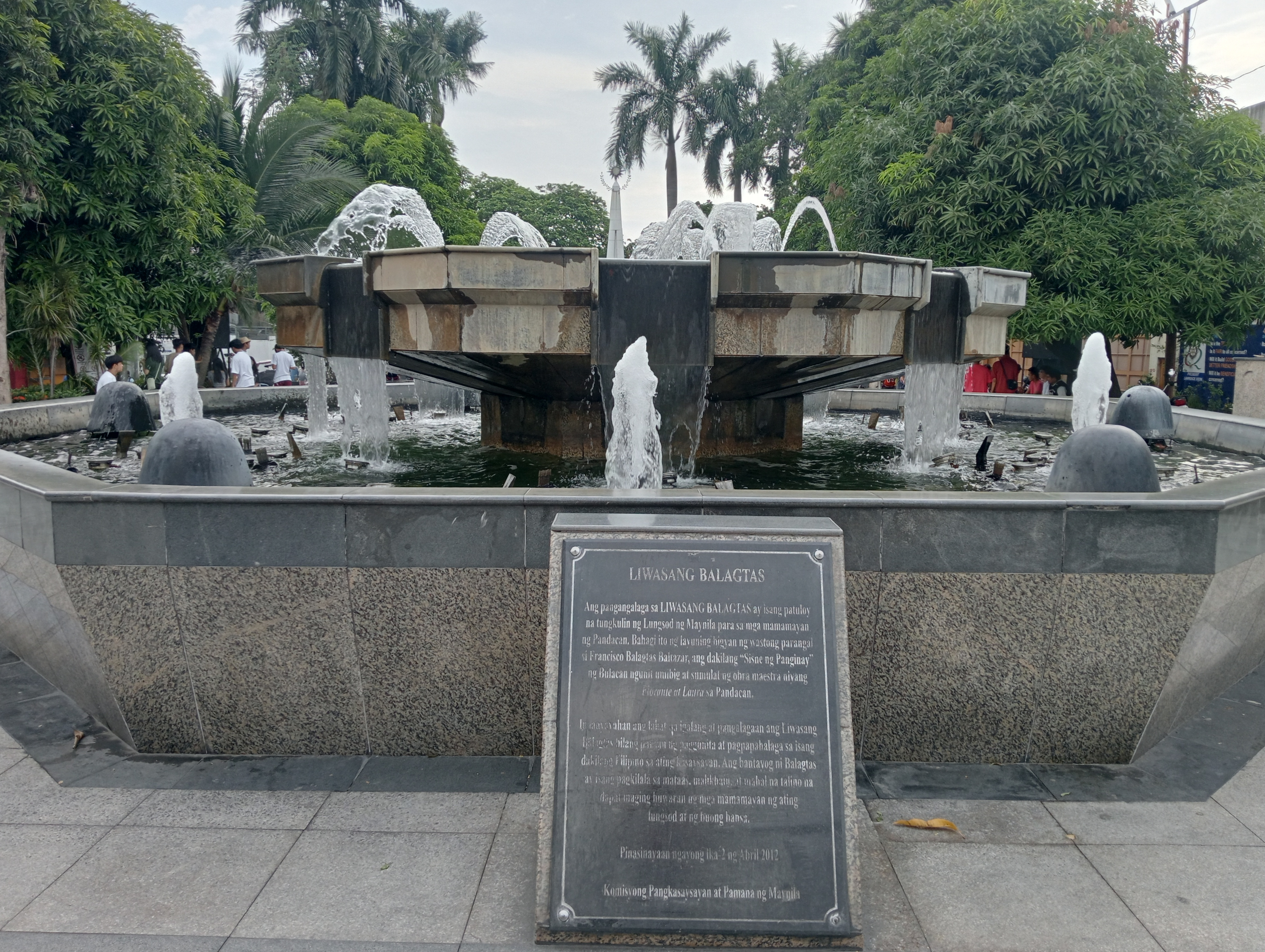
Plaza Balagtas

Atienza spearheaded a beautification program and spruced up parks and recreational facilities. This included the Plaza Balagtas that sits atop the Estero de Beata in 2003 and the Ladislao Bonus Park in 2006.

In September 2006, as part of Atienza's sidewalk redevelopment and street lighting program, the main highway from the corner of Jesus Street and Quirino Avenue at the foot of Nagtahan Bridge southwards into Palumpong Street and the whole of Laura Street up to the foot of the Padre Zamora Bridge was renovated, linking the walkways into the Pandacan Linear Park, a buffer zone made into a park separating the oil distribution facilities from the residential-commercial areas. The Pandacan Linear Park, developed under the support of the big three oil companies and the city government of Manila, allows for a leisure walk and recreational activities along the Pasig River.

=== Modern housing ===
Sections of the district are seeing improvements with a low-cost housing development in the site of the compound of the Manila City Engineer's Office beside the Nagtahan Bridge called "Residencias de Manila".

== Tourism and events ==
Manila boasts its rich cultural history every year in Pandacan with the traditional "Buling Buling" Dance Festival. Because many of the country's literary and musical geniuses of the 19th century came from Pandacan, an annual traditional dancing in the streets of Pandacan is featured every Saturday before the main celebrations for the feast of the Santo Niño every third week of January.

== See also ==
- Culture of the Philippines
- Places of interest in Pandacan
- Demographic history of the Philippines
- Languages of the Philippines
- Timeline of Philippine history
