= Paco Church =

Roman Catholic church in Manila, Philippines

- San Fernando de Dilao Parish
- Simbahan ng San Fernando de Dilao ng Paco (Filipino); Iglesia Parroquial de San Fernando de Dilao (Spanish); Ecclesiae Paroecialis a Sancti Fernandi Regis in loco v.d. Paco (Latin)
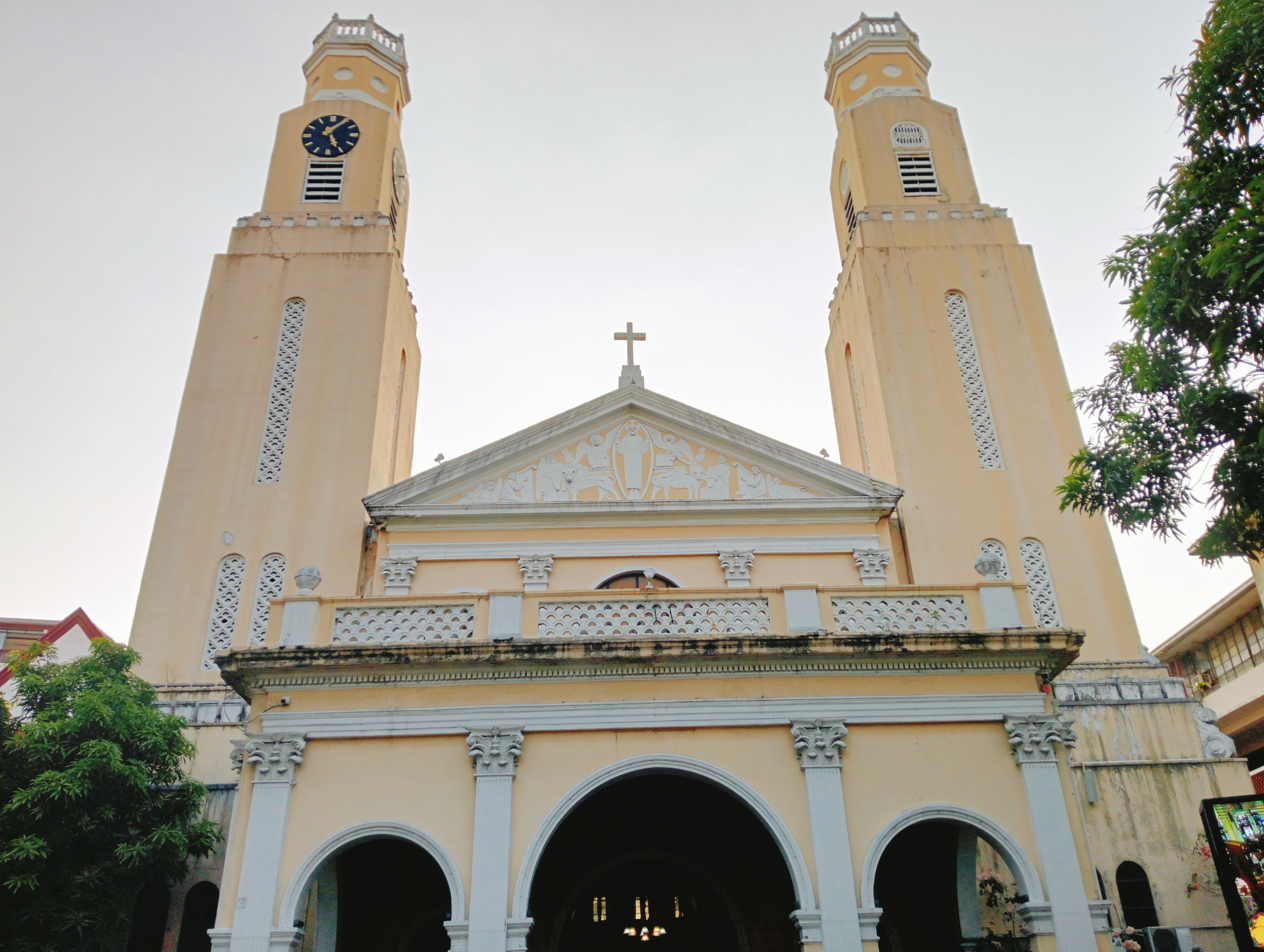
- Church façade in 2023
- Paco Church
- 14°34′46″N 120°59′33″E
- Location: Paco, Manila
- Country: Philippines
- Denomination: Catholic
- Website: San Fernando de Dilao

History
- Status: Parish church Pro-cathedral (2012–2014)
- Founded: 1580
- Dedication: Saint Ferdinand III of Castile
- Consecrated: April 29, 1934

Architecture
- Functional status: Active
- Architectural type: Church building
- Style: Neoclassical
- Groundbreaking: August 1931
- Completed: 1933

Specifications
- Materials: Sand, gravel, cement, mortar, steel

Administration
- Archdiocese: Manila
- Deanery: San Fernando de Dilao
- Parish: San Fernando de Dilao

Clergy
- Priest: Rev. Fr. Sanny C. de Claro

San Fernando de Dilao Parish, commonly known as Paco Church, is a Roman Catholic parish church located in the district of Paco in the city of Manila, Philippines, honoring the Castilian king Saint Ferdinand III of Castile. The parish is under the jurisdiction of the Archdiocese of Manila, of which it served as pro-cathedral from February 7, 2012, to April 9, 2014, during the structural renovations of the Manila Cathedral. The church inside is notable for its Romanesque-Byzantine interior with recently Italian Baroque styled altar, most notably the Latin inscriptions similar in style to Saint Peter's Basilica in Rome.

The church is currently administered by its parish priest, Rev. Fr. Sanny C. de Claro. In addition, the church provides active medical, dental, and ENT charitable services for its poor parishioners within the community.

== History ==
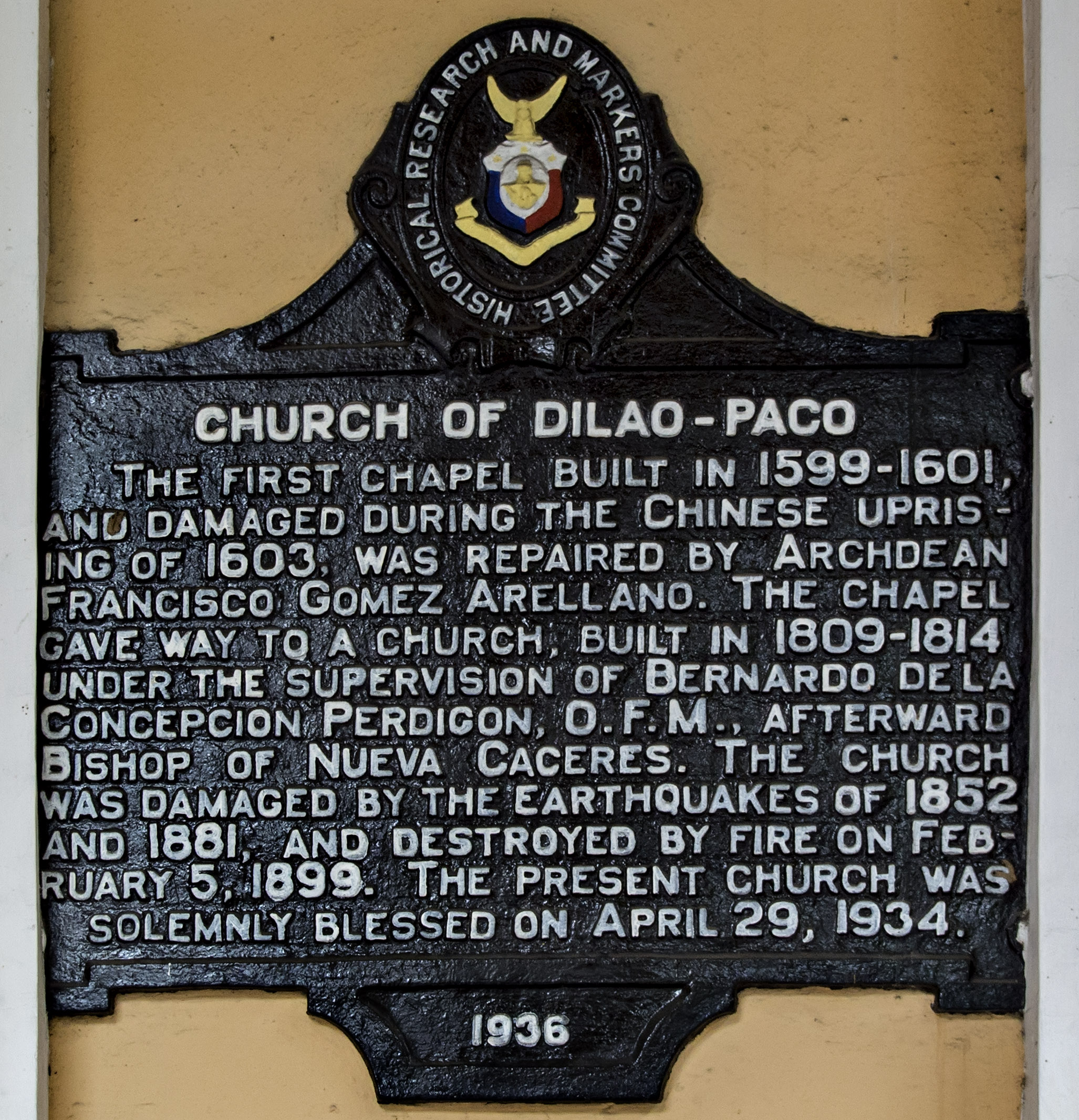
Commonwealth-era historical marker installed by the HRMC in 1936

In 1580, the first church built was made of nipa and bamboo and was originally dedicated to Our Lady of Purification. Fray Juan de Garrovillas of the Franciscan order rebuilt the church using stone materials from 1599 to 1601. The neighbourhood's name Dilao refers to a local shrub once used to dye textiles yellow (current Filipino orthography: diláw, "yellow").

On October 3, 1603, the church was attacked and burned by Chinese persons during riots. It was repaired in 1606 and rebuilt with stone materials by Don Francisco Gómez de Arellano. Invading troops from the Kingdom of Great Britain burnt down the church in 1762 during their occupation of Manila as part of the Seven Years' War. In 1791, a temporary church made of bamboo and nipa was erected.

Fray Joaquín Segui constructed the stone convento from 1793 to 1794, which was repaired in 1854. In 1880, this convent was ruined by an earthquake. Fr. Bernardo de la Concepción began the construction of a new church in 1809, which was completed in 1814. It was called Antigua Iglesia de Paco ("Old Paco Church"), while Fr. Miguel Richar built the belfry from 1839 to 1841. Earthquakes again destroyed the church in 1852 and 1880.

Fray Gilberto Martín began the reconstruction of the church in 1881. When this was about to be completed, a typhoon in 1892 partly destroyed the church. In 1896, Fray Gilberto completed the reconstruction work.

On February 5, 1899, the church was bombed and completely burned, along with its records, during the Philippine–American War. Belgian priests of the Congregatio Immaculati Cordis Mariae took possession of the burnt church in 1909, and in the following year, Fr. Raymundo Esquinet worked for the construction of a temporary concrete church at a site near the old church's ruins. In 1924, Fr. José Billie proposed a newer and much larger church, and the cornerstone of the present church was laid in August 1931. It was completed in 1933 and was consecrated in April the following year.

On February 7, 2012, the church was designated as pro-cathedral of the Manila until structural renovations on the Manila Cathedral were completed on April 9, 2014.

A notable longstanding custom of the church today is the devotion to Nuestro Santo Padre Jesús del Sepulcro. Also known as Santo Entierro, the image is a statue of the dead Christ encased in a special wood and glass casket, and is a common icon in Filipino churches.

== Architecture ==
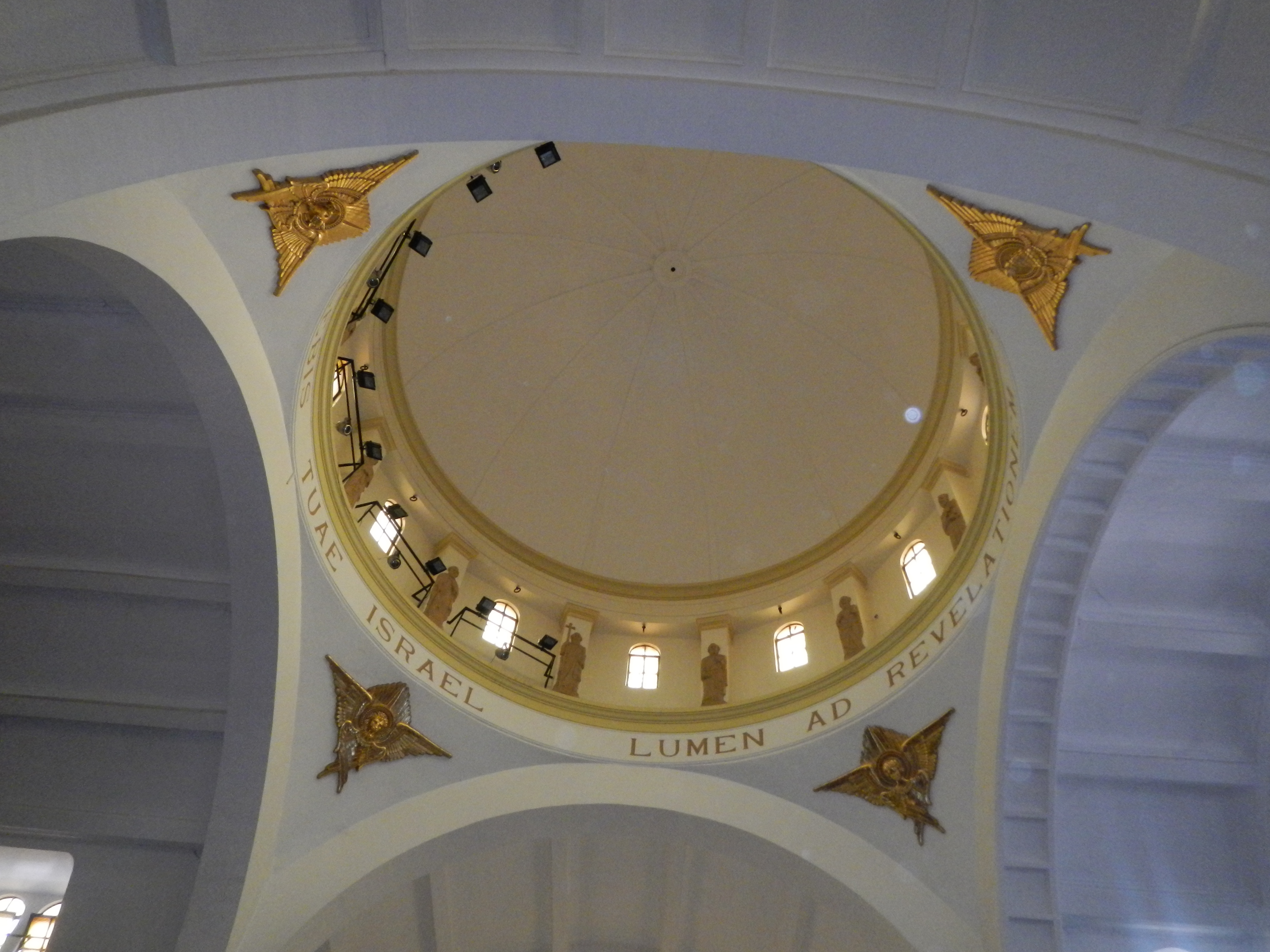
Dome interior

The church façade, flanked by tall, twin belfries, possess a neoclassical style of architecture. The terraced, arcaded portico provides a transitional entrance to the church. The Corinthian columns on the first and second levels of the church plus the triangular pediment give the façade the classic character.

== Vicariate of San Fernando de Dilao ==
The church is under the jurisdiction of the Archdiocese of Manila under the vicariate forane of San Fernando de Dilao. Aside from the parish church, the vicariate covers the following churches:

- Peñafrancia de Manila Shrine - Paco
- Sta. Maria Goretti Parish - Paco
- Saint Peter the Apostle Parish - Paco
- Pandacan Church

== Gallery ==
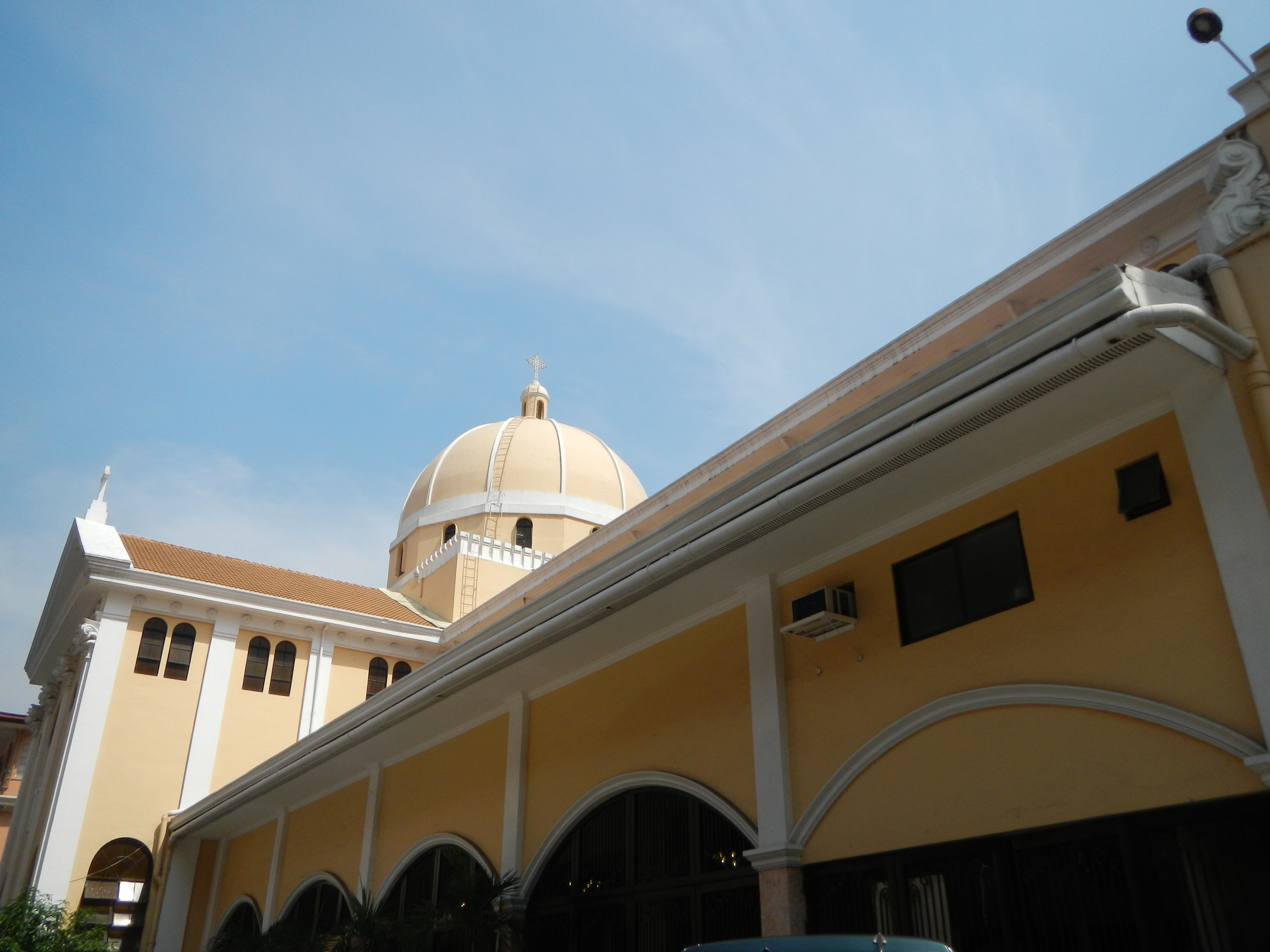
Church side view showing the dome

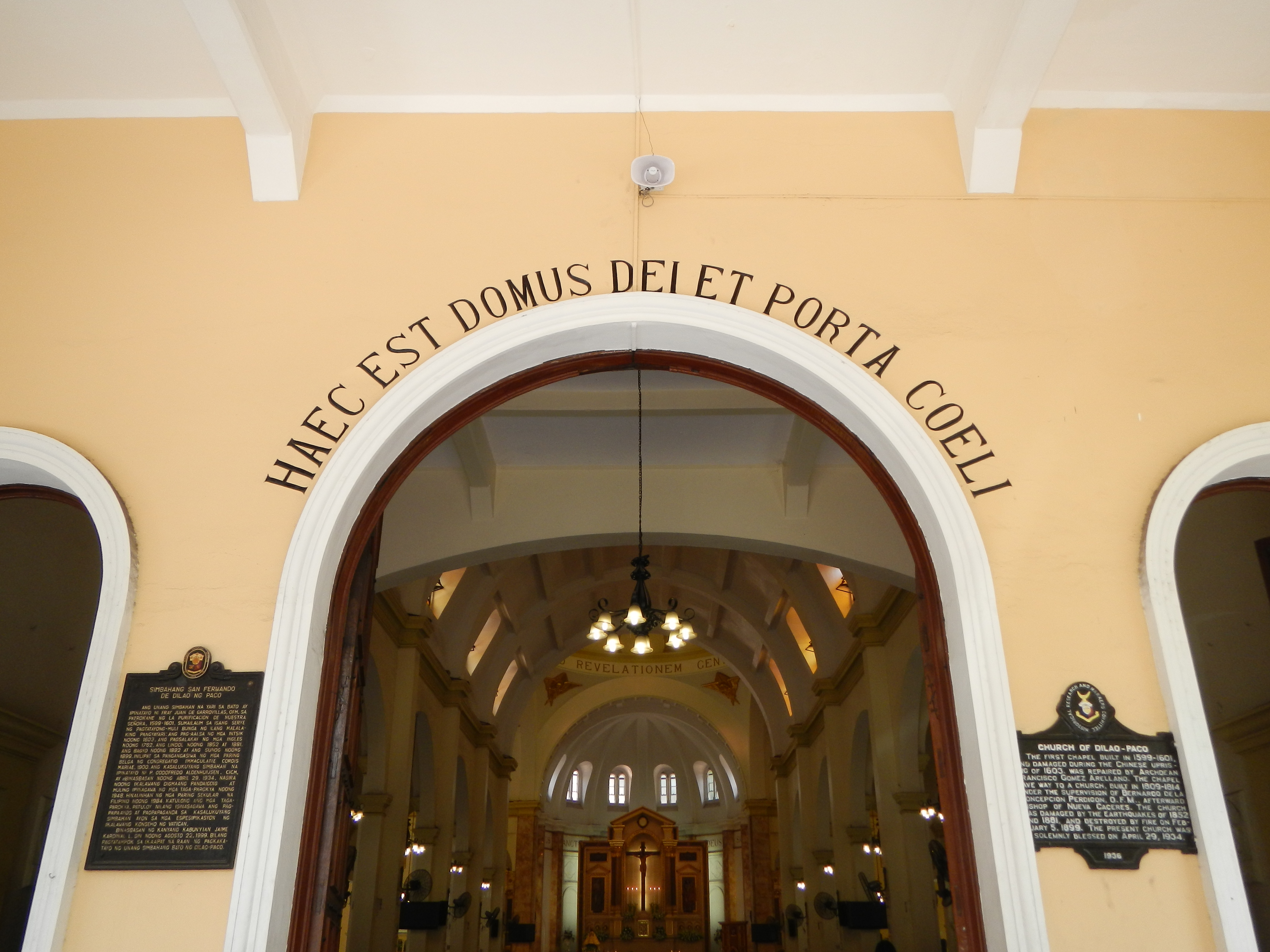
Church main door showing the nave. The inscription above it reads Hæc est Domus Dei et Porta Cœli ("Here is the House of God and the Door to Heaven").

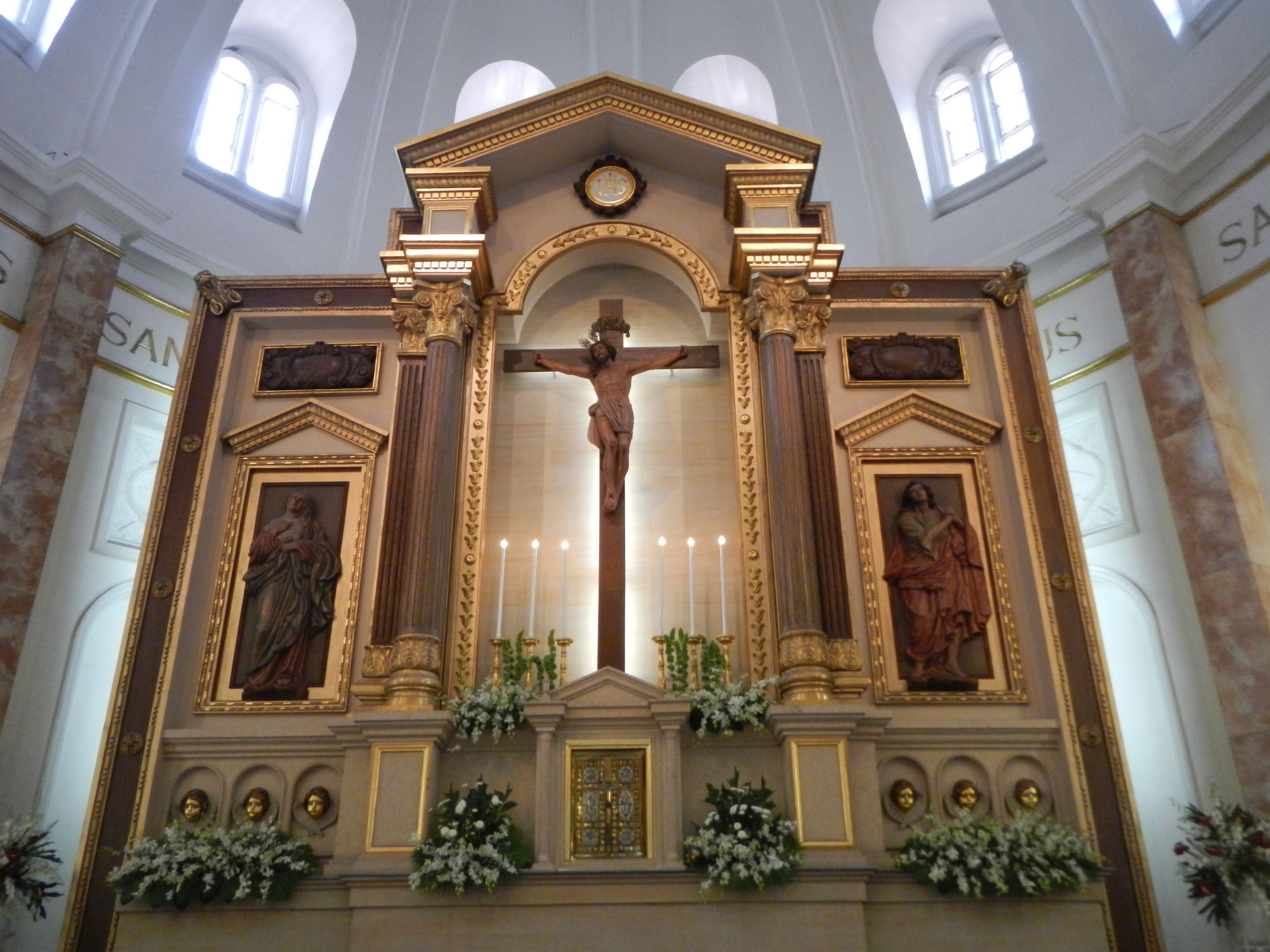
Retablo of the main altar

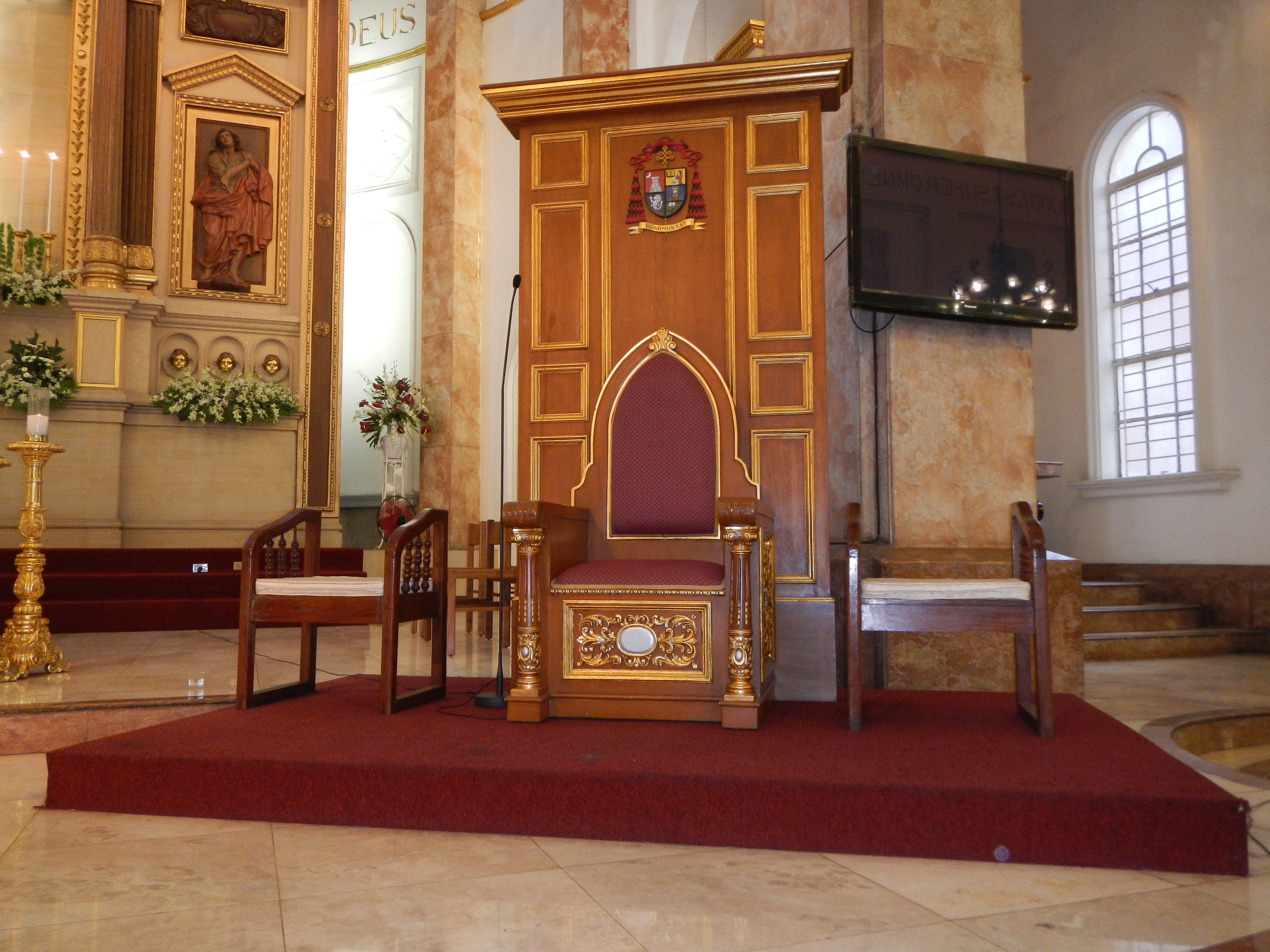
Cathedra of the Archbishop of Manila, when the church was used as a pro-cathedral

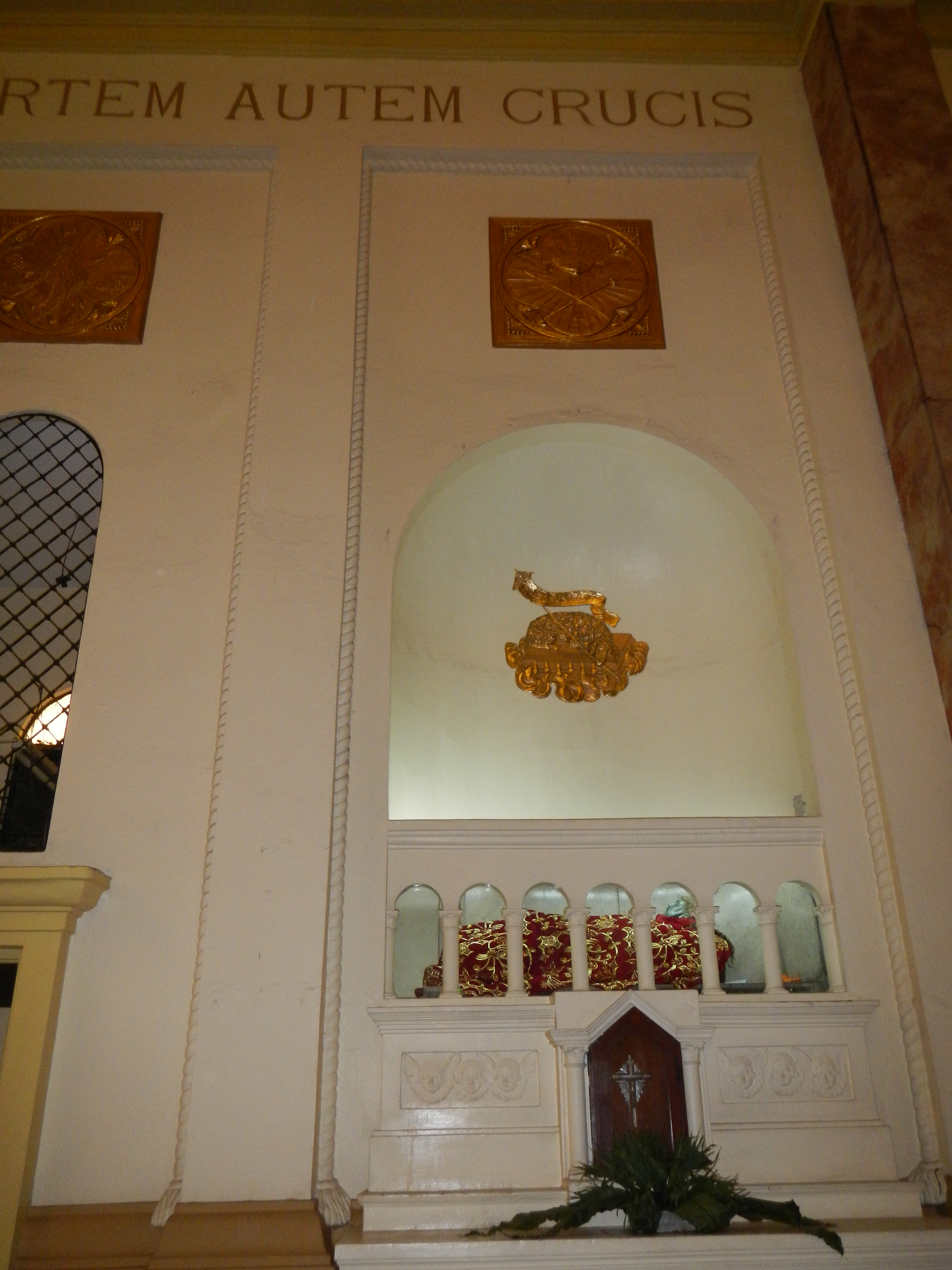
Santo Entierro image enshrined inside the church. The Principal Patron of the Parish and Town.

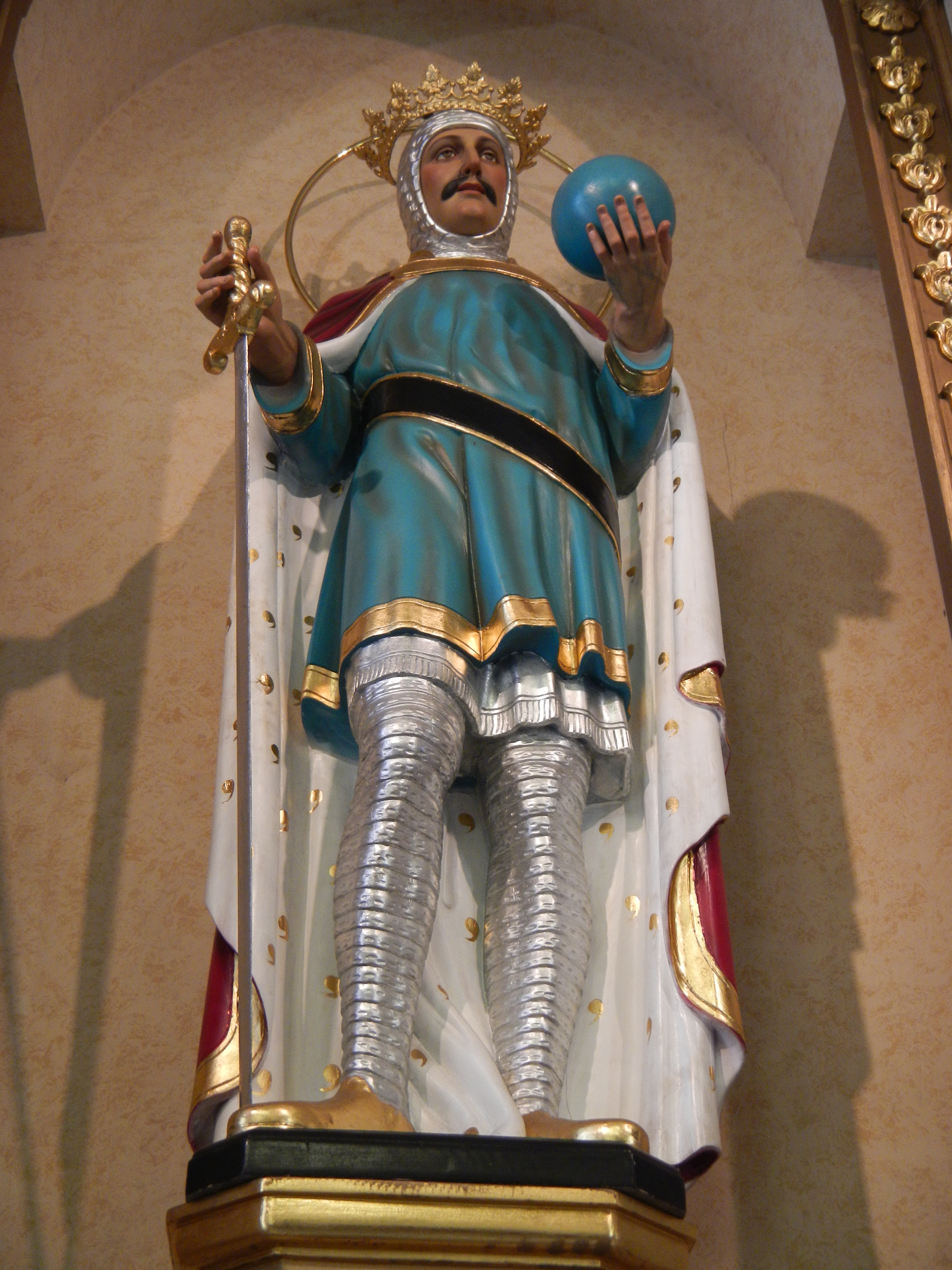
Image of the church's titular, Saint Ferdinand III of Castile

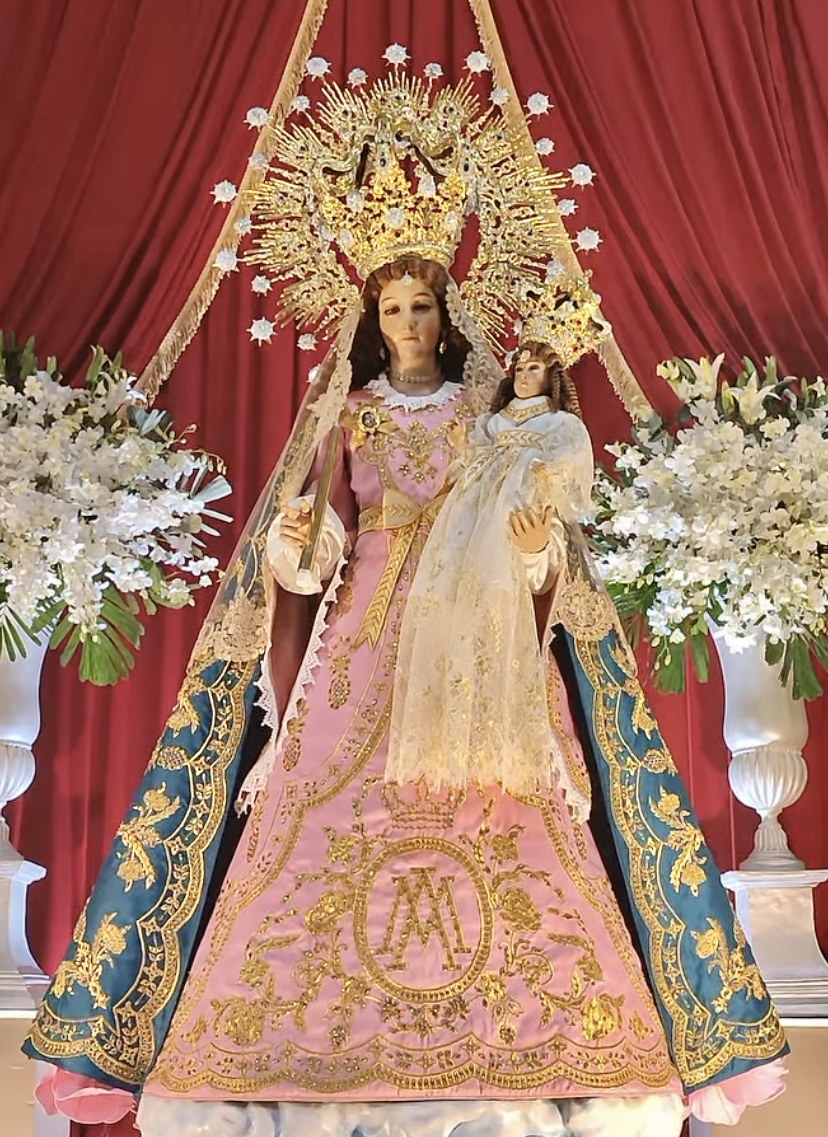
The image Our Lady of Candelaria venerated inside the church which was episcopally crowned on February 2, 2025

== See also ==
- ► National Consecration to the Immaculate Heart of Mary
