= Sampaloc Church =

Roman Catholic church in Manila, Philippines

- National Shrine and Parish of Our Lady of Loreto
- Loreto Church
- Pambansang Dambana at Parokya ng Mahal na Birhen ng Loreto (Filipino)
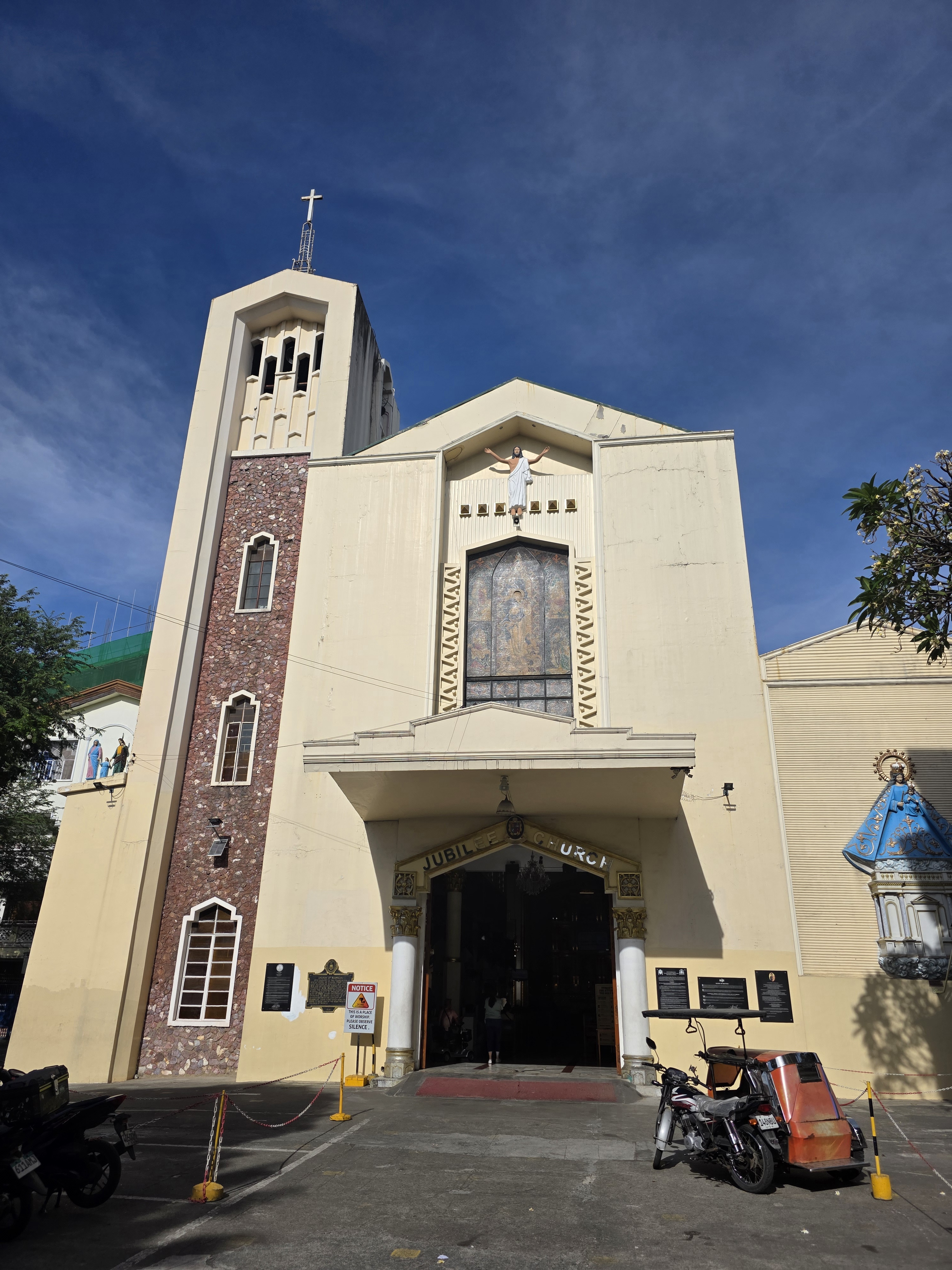
- Church facade in 2026
- Sampaloc Church
- 14°36′12″N 120°59′37″E
- Location: Sampaloc, Manila
- Country: Philippines
- Denomination: Roman Catholic

History
- Status: National Shrine
- Founded: 1613
- Dedication: Our Lady of Loreto

Architecture
- Functional status: Active
- Architectural type: Church building
- Style: Romanesque
- Completed: 1958

Administration
- Archdiocese: Manila
- Deanery: Our Lady of Loreto
- Parish: Our Lady of Loreto

Clergy
- Rector: Rev. Fr. Enrico Martin F. Adoviso (Team Ministry Moderator and vicar forane)
- Vicar: Rev. Fr. Norman M. Gandia
- Priest: Rev. Fr. Primitivo T. Lopez (Team Ministry Member)

The National Shrine and Parish of Our Lady of Loreto, commonly known as Sampaloc Church or Loreto Church, is a Roman Catholic church located along Figueras Street (formerly Bustillos) in the district of Sampaloc in the City of Manila. It is under the jurisdiction of the Archdiocese of Manila. The church is named after and dedicated to the Virgin Mary and her pilgrimage site in Loreto, Italy where tradition states as the site where the Mary's house was relocated.

== History ==
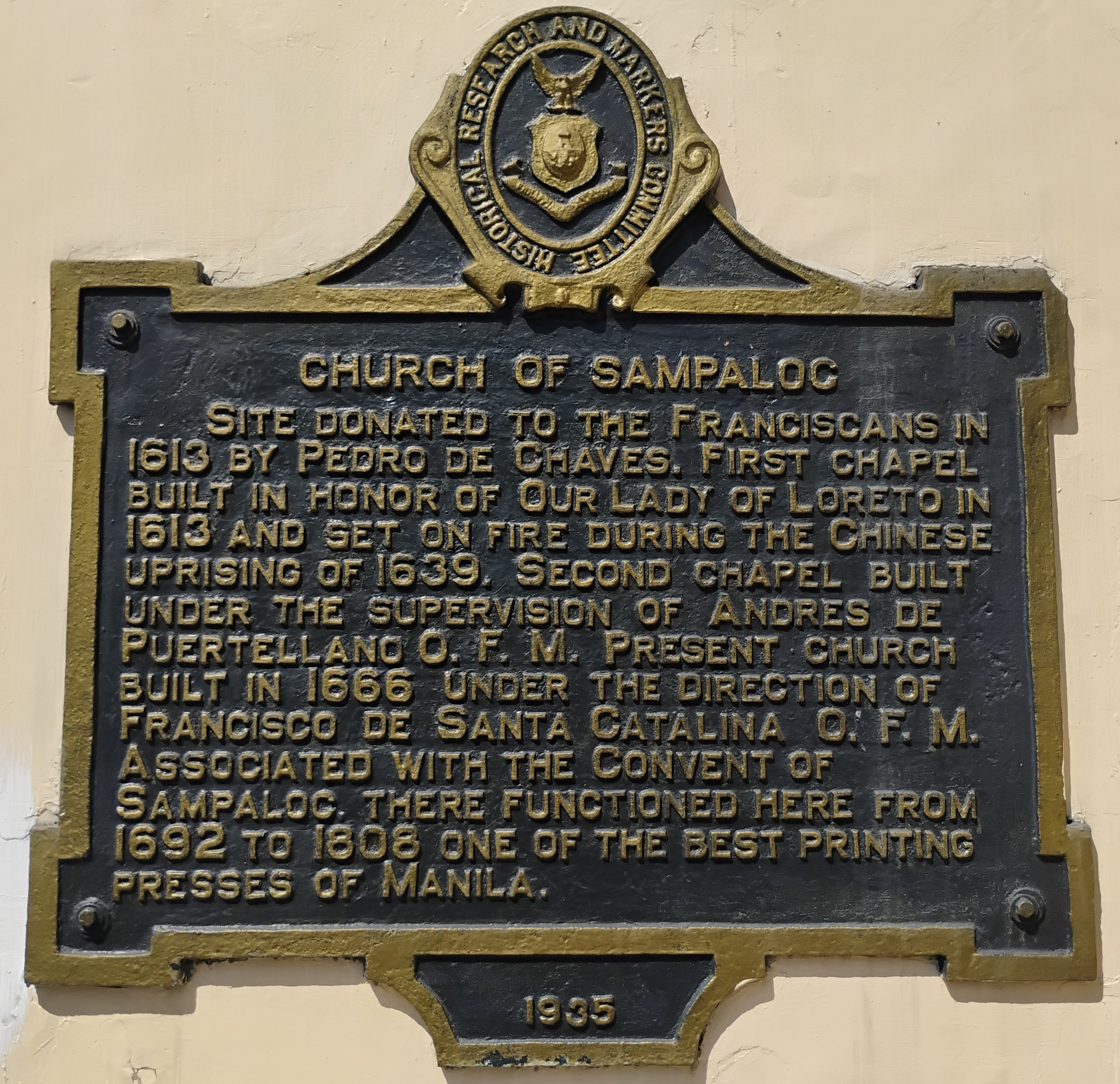
Church HRMC historical marker originally installed in 1935

The Franciscans under Father Blas de la Madre de Dios, the Provincial Father of the Philippine Franciscan mission, built the first church on the Sampaloc site in 1613. It was made into a parish that same year, along with the enshrinement of the Marian image of Our Lady of Loreto. A convent was built near the church which in 1621 which served as the first home of the congregation of Poor Clares in the country led by Mother Jeronima de la Asuncion before they moved to Intramuros later that year.

The first church was reconstructed twice, first in 1640 as a result of a 1639 Chinese revolt that burned down the church, and again in 1666 after damage from a 1645 earthquake and because of the needs of a growing community in Sampaloc. The church was also affected by the 1880 earthquake, after which its toppled steeple was reconstructed.

The original jurisdiction of the parish of Sampaloc comprised not only the present Sampaloc district but it also extended into present-day Pandacan and Santa Mesa. Pandacan was separated to have its own parish in 1712 while a separate parish for Santa Mesa was established in 1911. In 1932, another split was made in the parish's territory when a parish was established to serve the community in the eastern part of Sampaloc that is known as Balic-Balic. The administration of the Sampaloc parish by then was given to the Archdiocese of Manila, which was effected in 1899.

The Battle of Manila in 1945 completely destroyed the original church, including its records. The church was temporarily rebuilt as a wood and bamboo structure while plans were made for the construction of a more permanent structure. On November 22, 1958, the present church was completed and was rededicated to the Our Lady of Loreto. The church was further adorned with the addition of a bronze sculpture in 1975 by Filipino sculptor Ed Castrillo.

The church was elevated to the status of archdiocesan shrine by the Archdiocese of Manila on December 5, 2002. On March 23, 2023, the Manila City Council passed an ordinance recognizing Our Lady of Loreto as the patroness of Sampaloc, Manila.

On December 1, 2023, the Marian image was first episcopally crowned by Cardinal Jose Advincula. On May 6, 2024, the Dicastery for Divine Worship and the Discipline of the Sacraments decreed the pontifical coronation of the Marian statue, for the Archdiocese of Manila. The coronation rites was presided by the Apostolic Nuncio to the Philippines, Charles John Brown, on December 10, 2024.

On January 25, 2025, the Catholic Bishops' Conference of the Philippines formally elevated the church to the status of a National Shrine. The solemn declaration took place on May 31, 2025, coinciding with the Feast of the Visitation of Mary.

On March 25, 2025, on the feast of the Annunciation, the shrine was declared as an Aggregate Shrine of the Pontifical Shrine of the Holy House in Loreto, Italy.

== Priests ==
Name	Present Assignment
Rev. Fr. Enrico Martin F. Adoviso	Rector & Team Ministry Moderator
Rev. Fr. Norman M. Gandia	Parochial Vicar
Rev. Fr. Primitivo T. Lopez	Team Ministry Member
Rev. Msgr. Emmanuel V. Suñga, PC	Attached Priest
Rev. Fr. Pericles F. Fajardo	Attached Priest
Rev. Fr. Chate Lier Javier	Resident Guest Priest

== Gallery ==
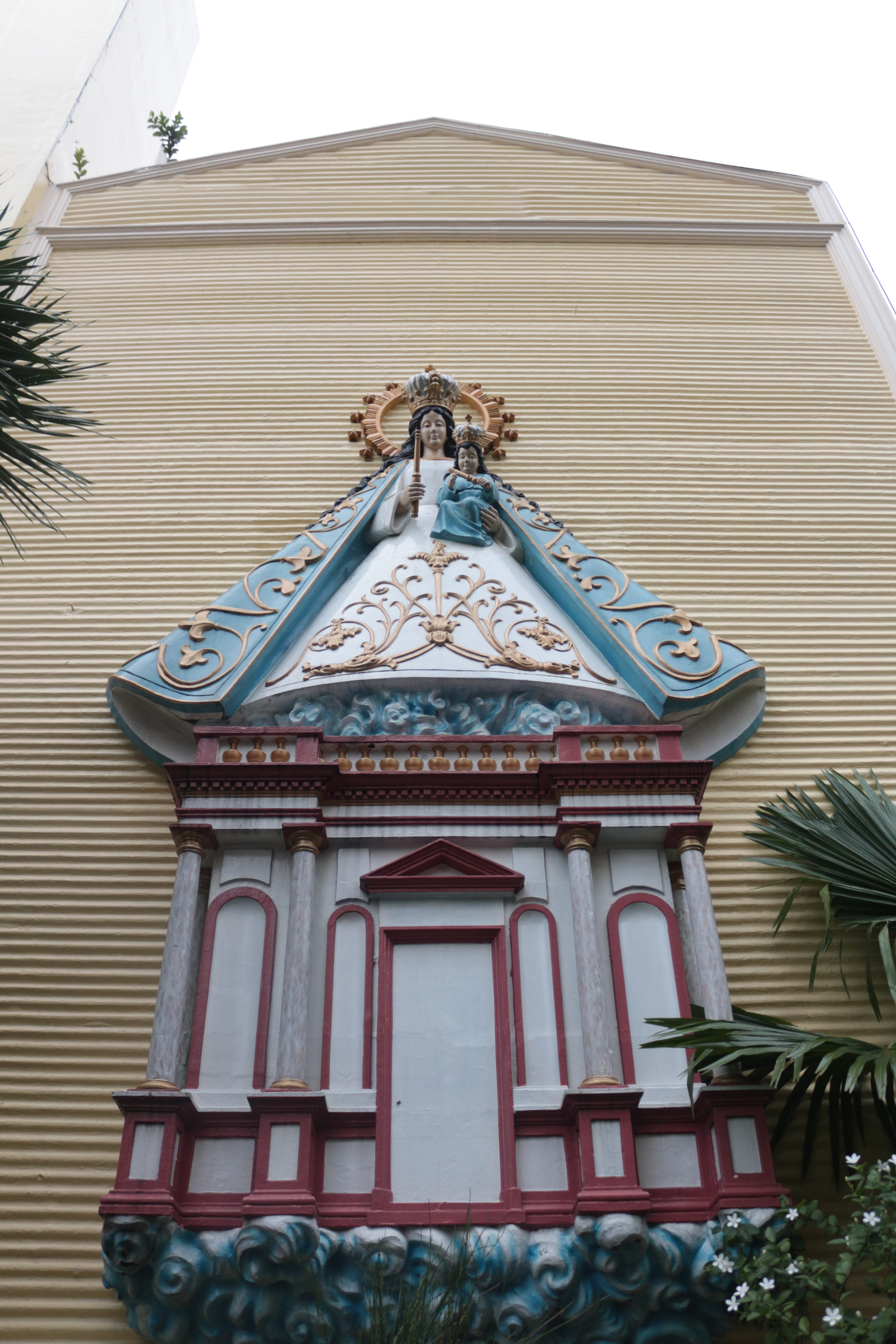
Sculpture of Our Lady of Loreto donated by First Lady Leonila Garcia

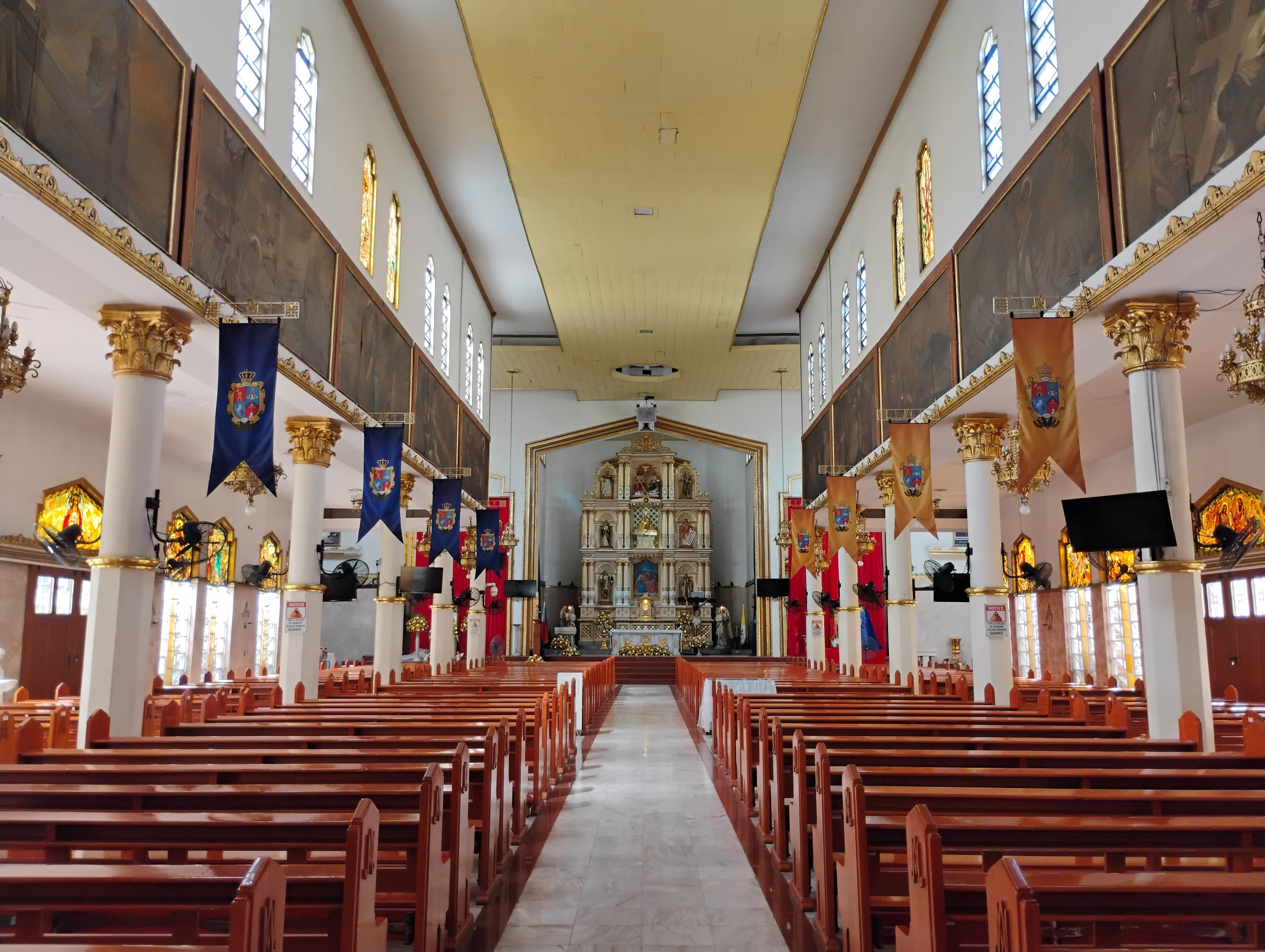
Church interior in 2026

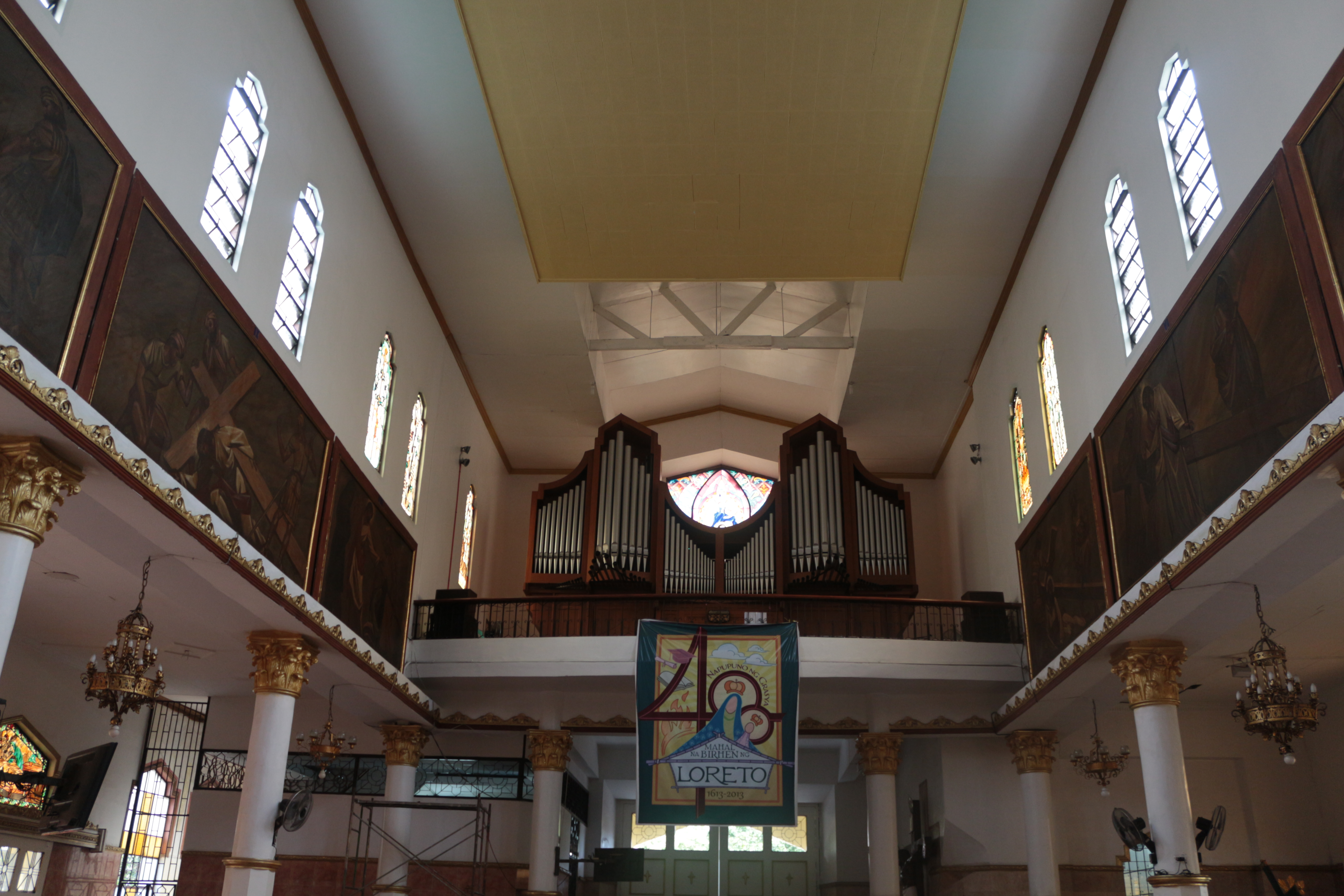
Choir loft and pipe organ

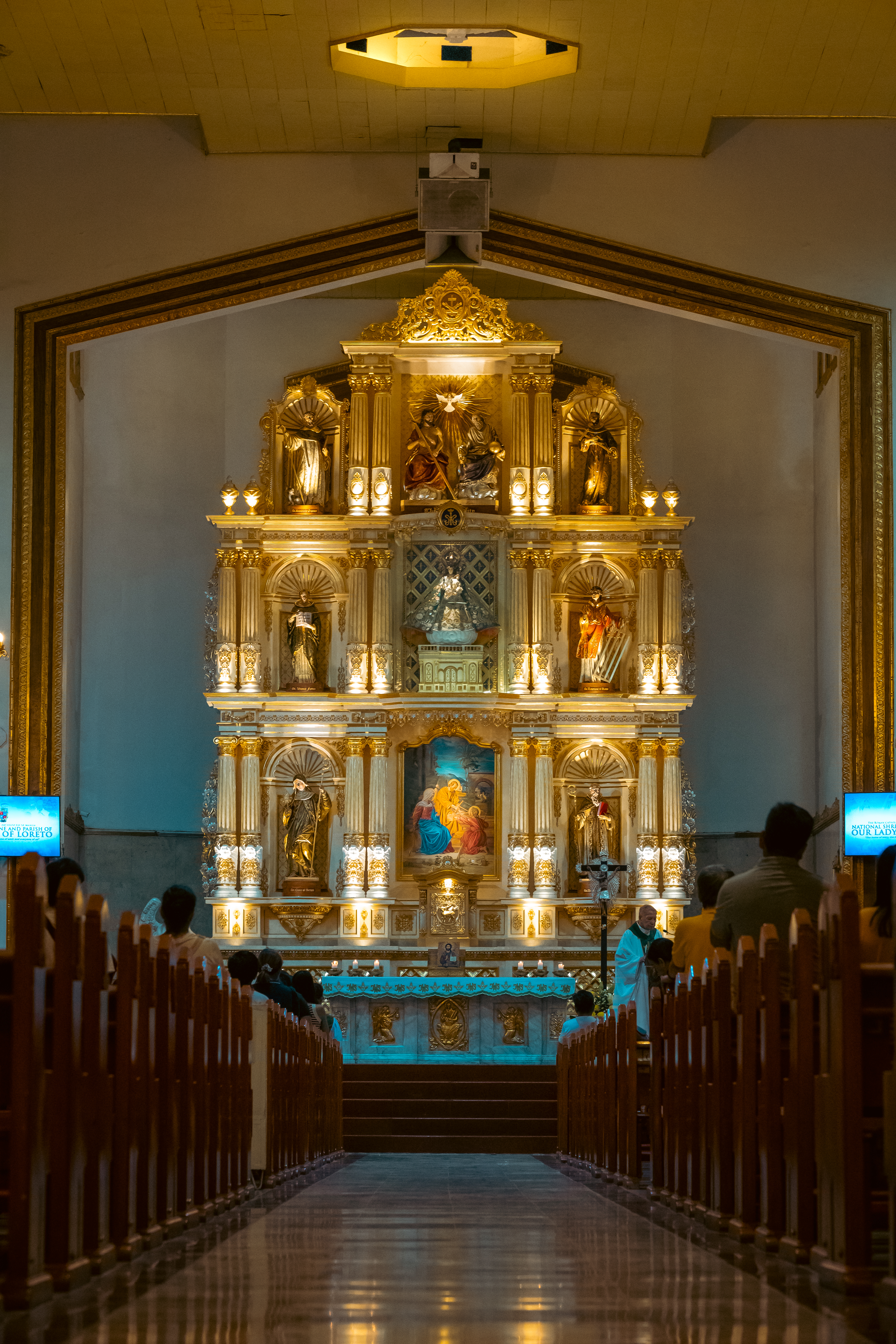
Church main altar in 2025, patterned after the pre-war retablo

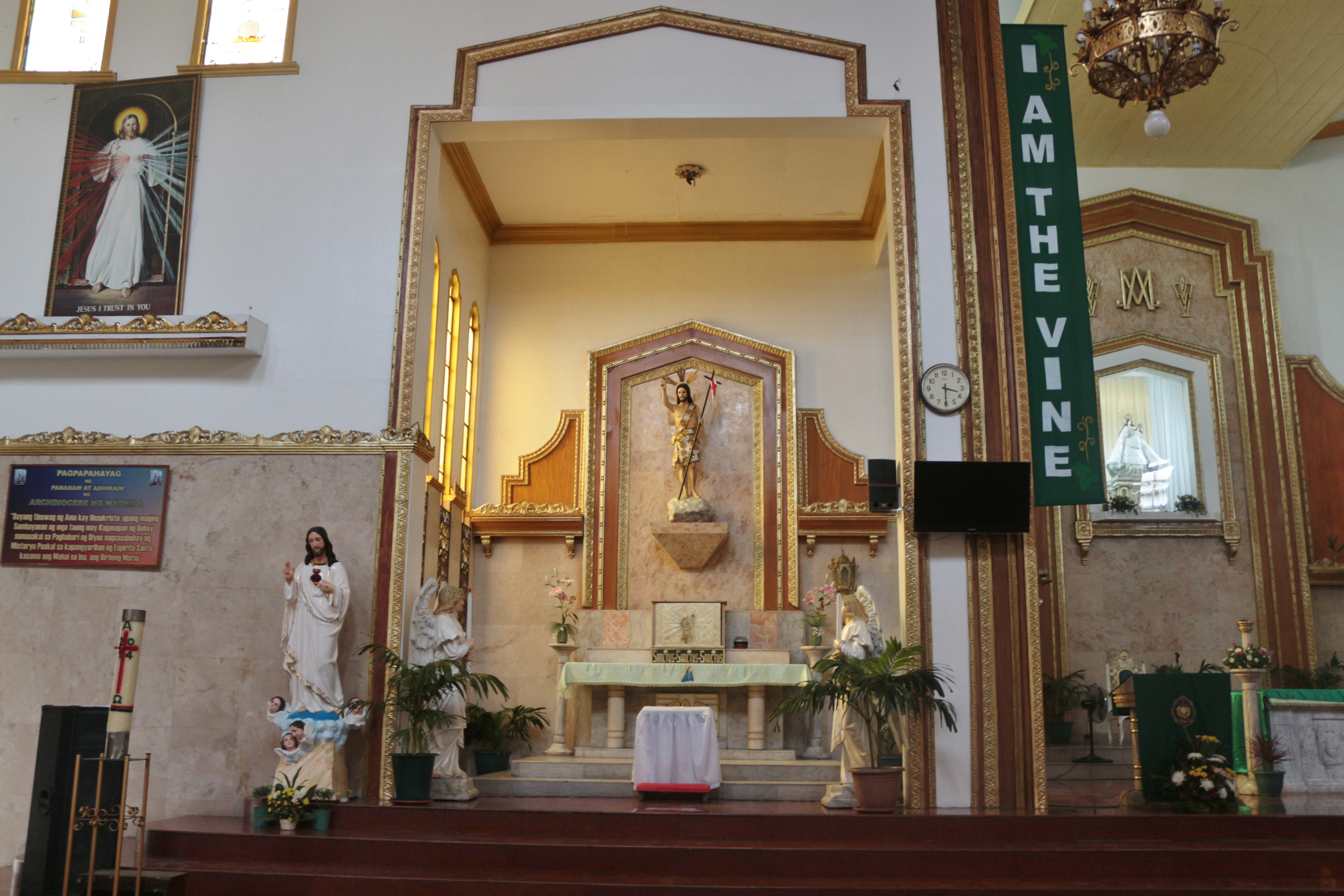
Church side altar

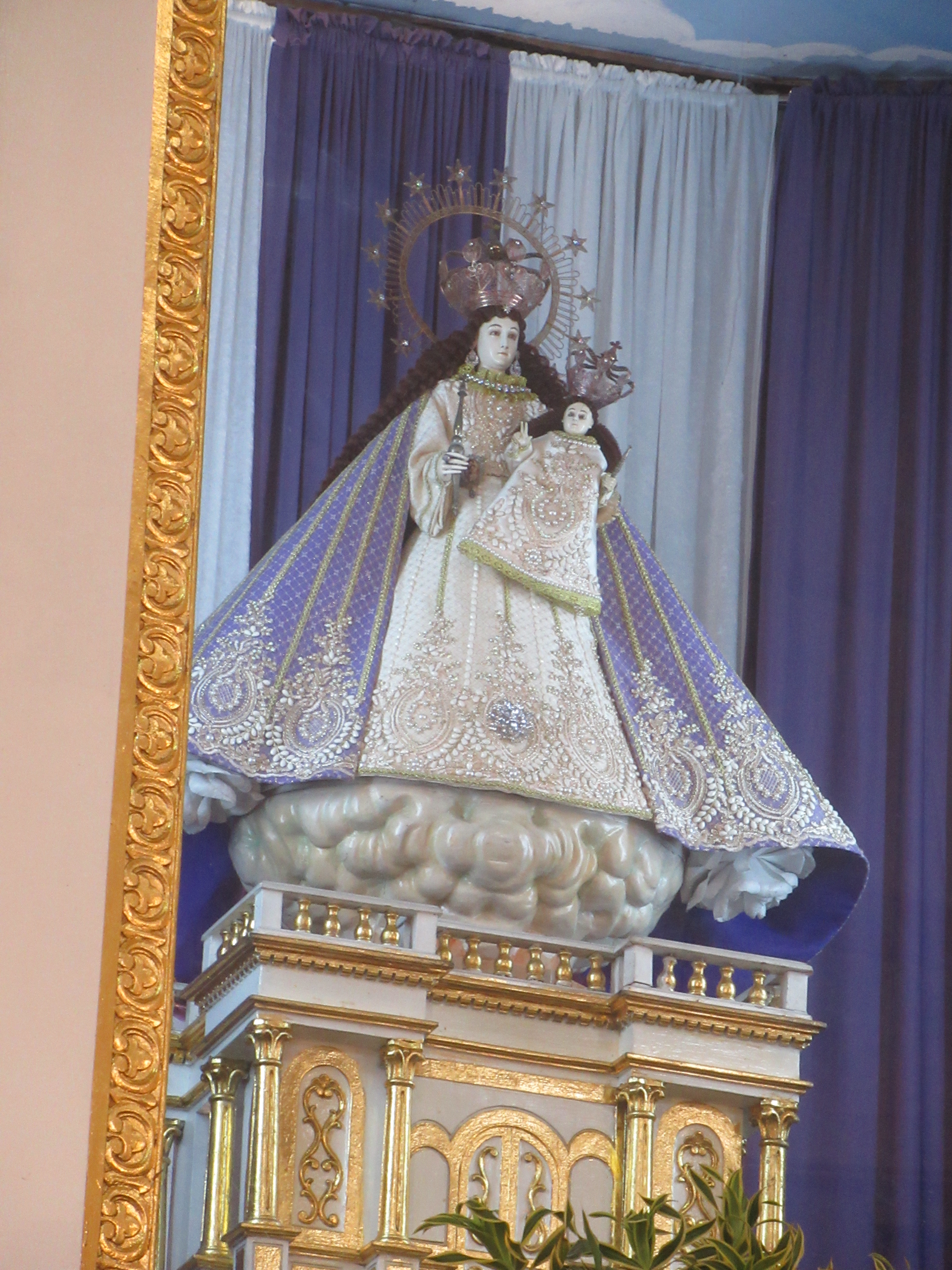
The venerated image of Our Lady of Loreto at the main altar of the church

== St. Anthony Shrine ==
Saint Anthony Shrine
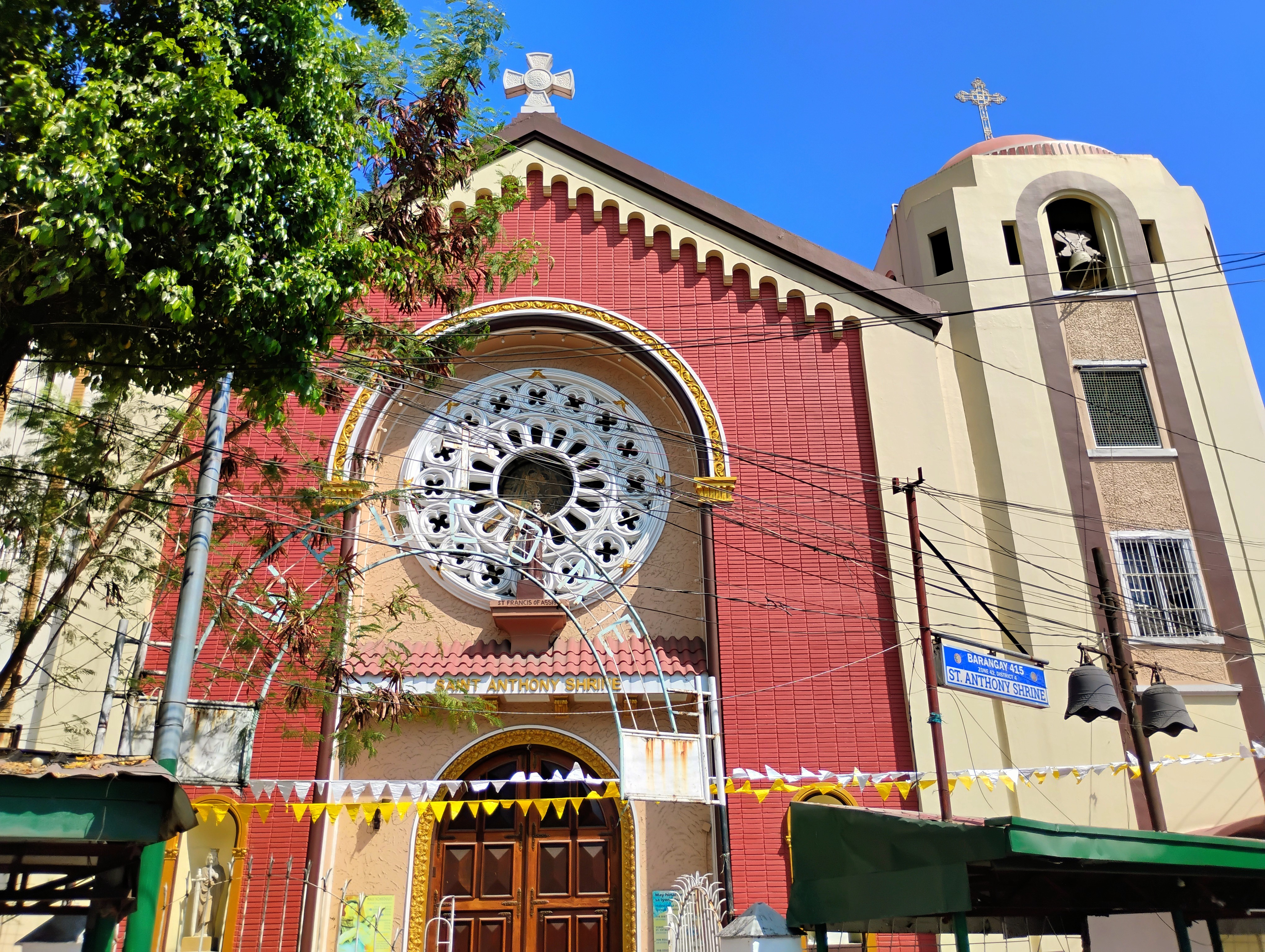
- The church in 2026
- Saint Anthony Shrine
- 14°36′10″N 120°59′36″E
- Location: Sampaloc, Manila
- Country: Philippines
- Denomination: Roman Catholic
- Religious order: Venerable Third Order of the Franciscans

History
- Status: Shrine
- Founded: 1794
- Dedication: Our Lady of the Pilgrims; St. Anthony of Padua

Architecture
- Functional status: Active
- Architectural type: Church building
- Completed: 1947

Administration
- Archdiocese: Manila
- Deanery: Our Lady of Loreto

Clergy
- Rector: Fr. Baltazar Obico, OFM

Adjacent to the Our Lady of Loreto National Shrine is the St. Anthony of Padua Shrine, a church administered by the Venerable Third Order of the Franciscans (Spanish: Venerable Orden Tercera). The church traces its origins in 1794, when the Third Order proceeded to build its own church near the premises of the Loreto Church upon the invitation of their Franciscan brethren who were administering Loreto at that time. The church was originally dedicated to the Our Lady of the Pilgrims (Spanish: Nuestra Señora de la Peregrina), but it was destroyed along with the original Loreto Church in the Battle of Manila of 1945.

Work proceeded shortly for the construction of the new church, which was completed in 1947. This time the church was dedicated as a shrine to St. Anthony of Padua after Franciscans decided to transfer the devotional activities to St. Anthony from the now destroyed San Francisco Church in Intramuros to Sampaloc Church.

Due to their proximity and shared history, the Loreto and St. Anthony churches have been known alternately as "the twin churches of Sampaloc" and "the twin churches of Bustillos".

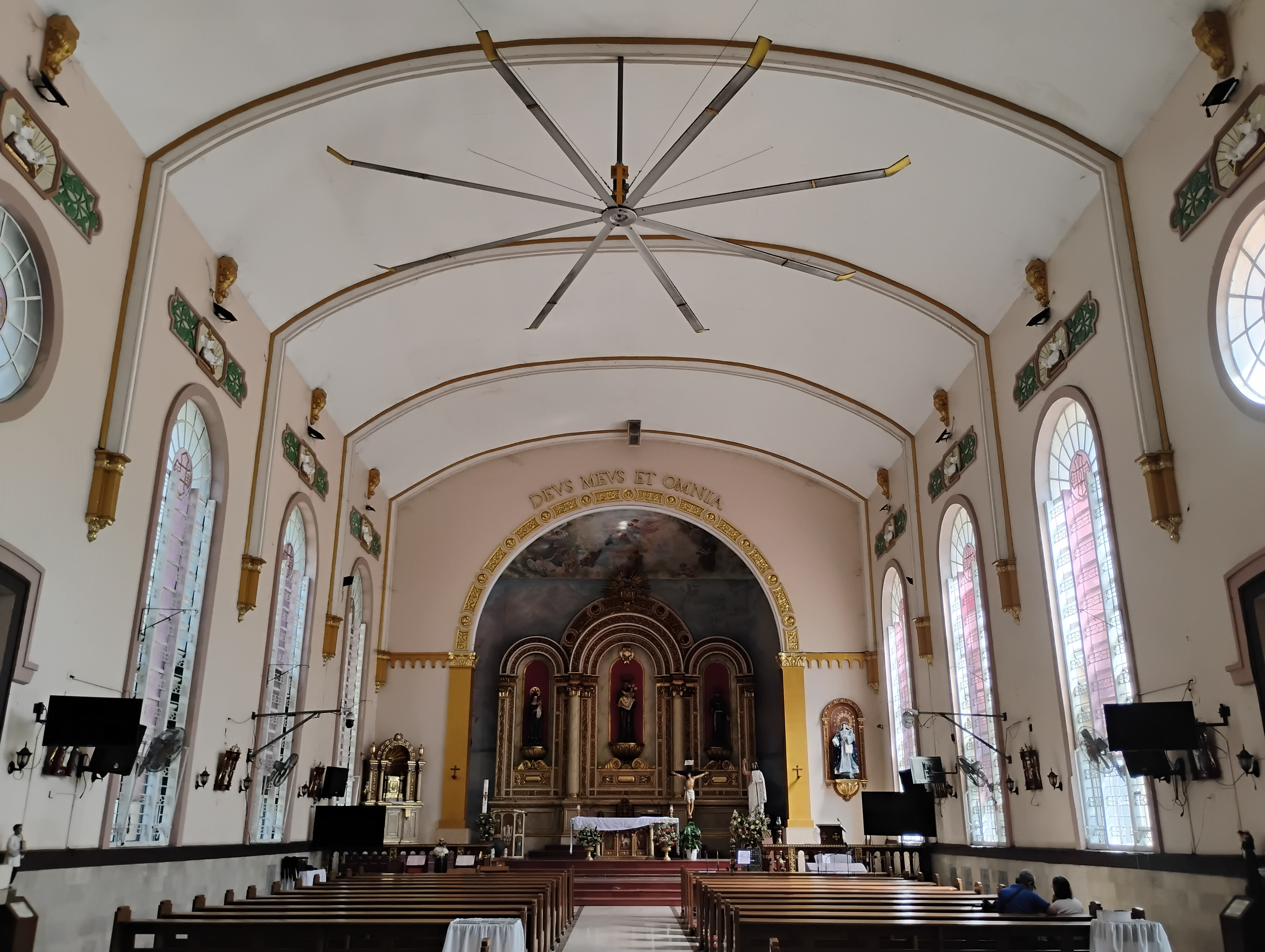
Church interior in 2026

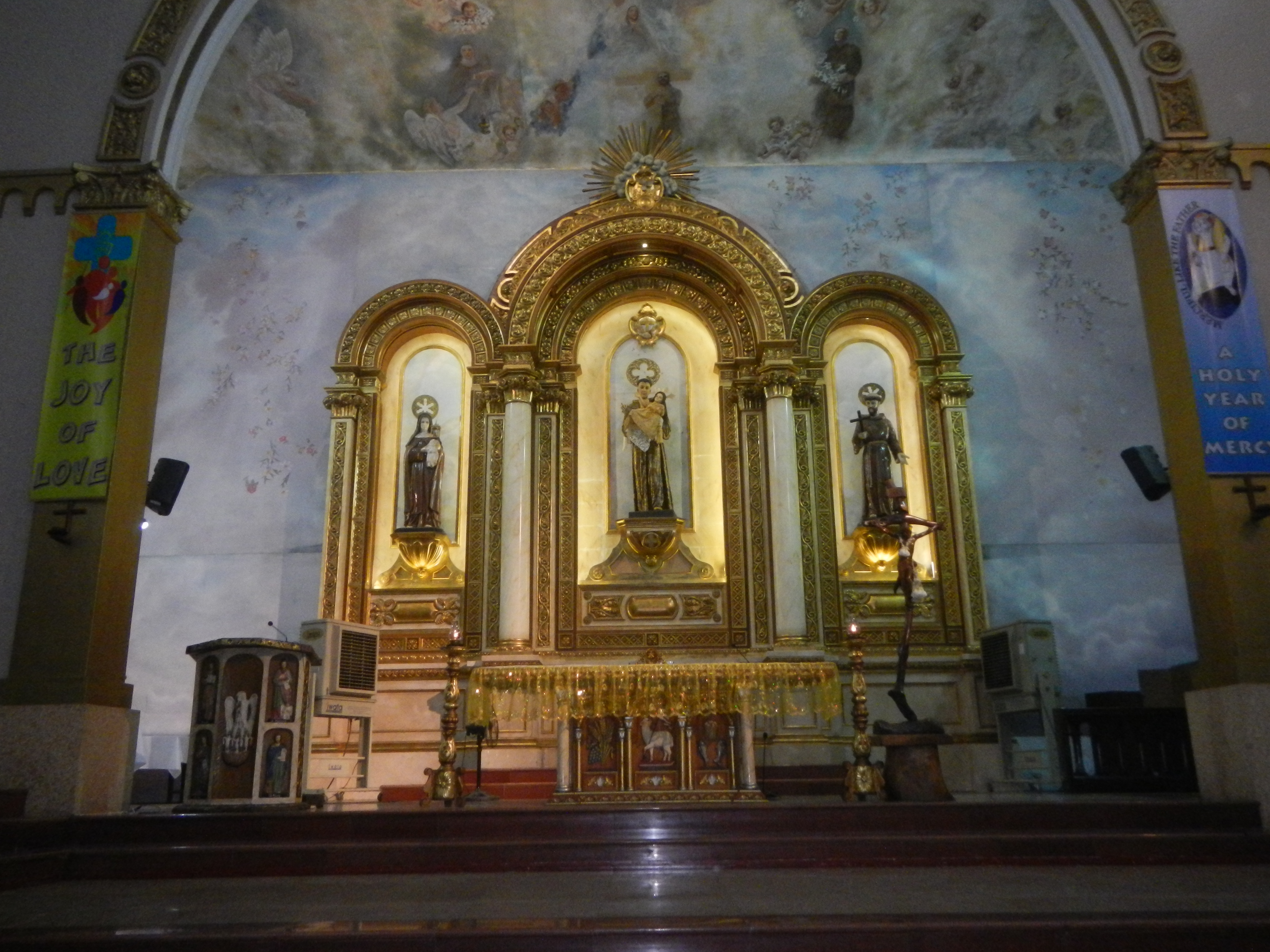
Church altar and reredos

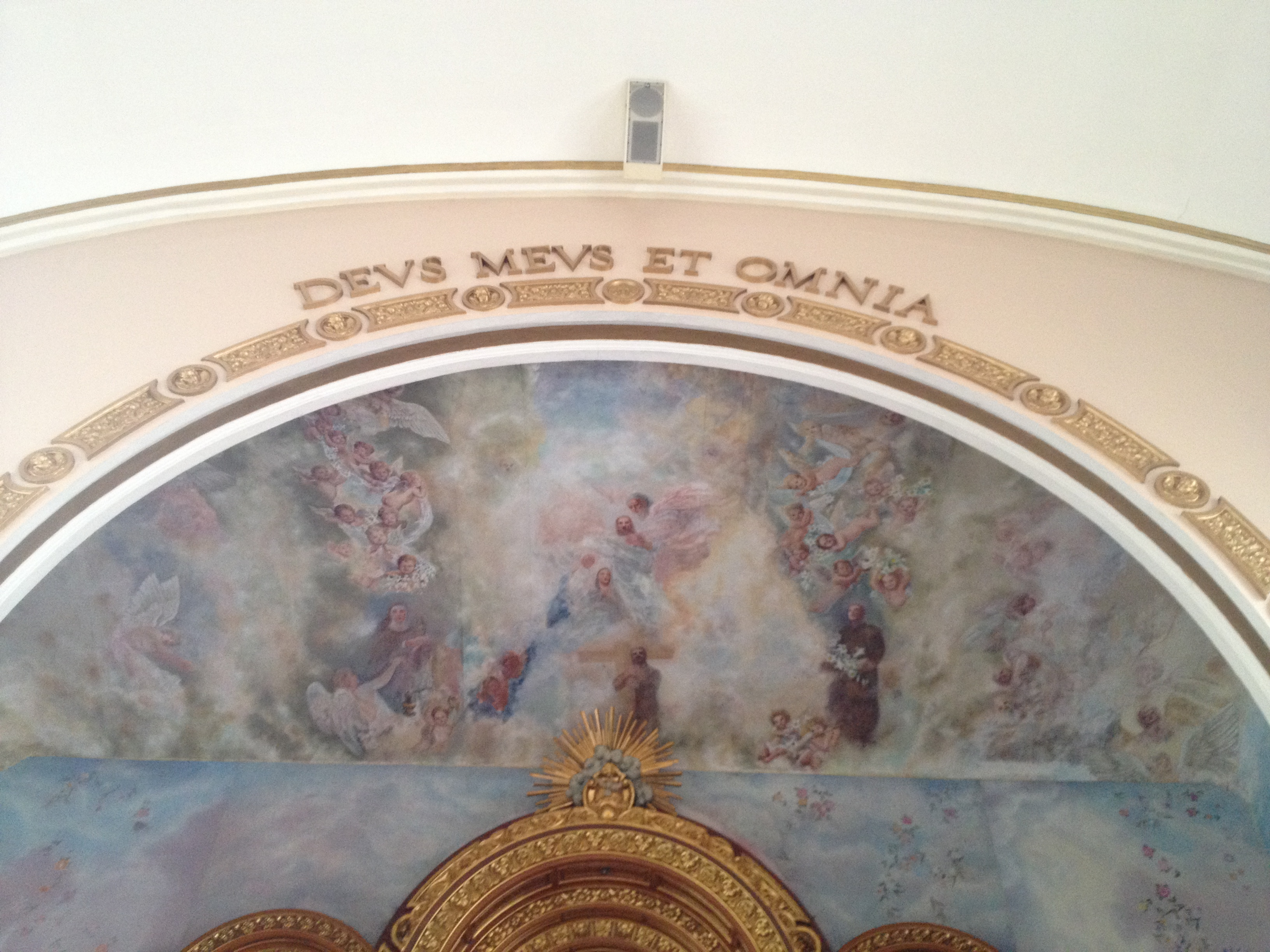
Ceiling art above the altar

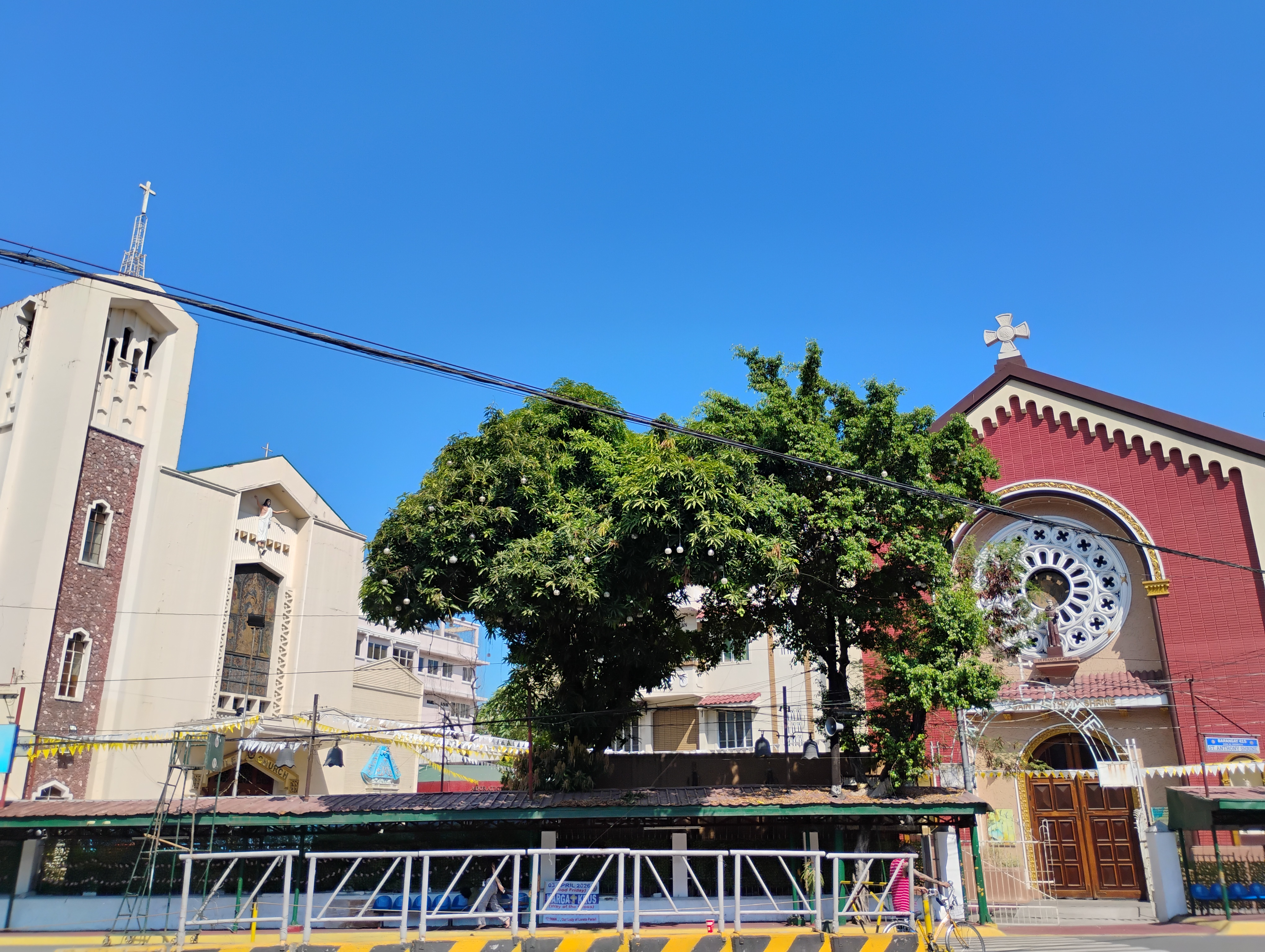
The twin churches of Sampaloc (Our Lady of Loreto National Shrine, left, and St. Anthony Shrine, right)
