= Pandacan Church =

Roman Catholic church in Manila, Philippines

- Santo Niño de Pandacan Parish
- Parokya ng Santo Niño de Pandacan (Filipino); Parroquia del Santo Niño de Pandacan (Spanish); Ecclesia Parœcialis de S. Pueri in loci v.d. Pandacan (Latin)
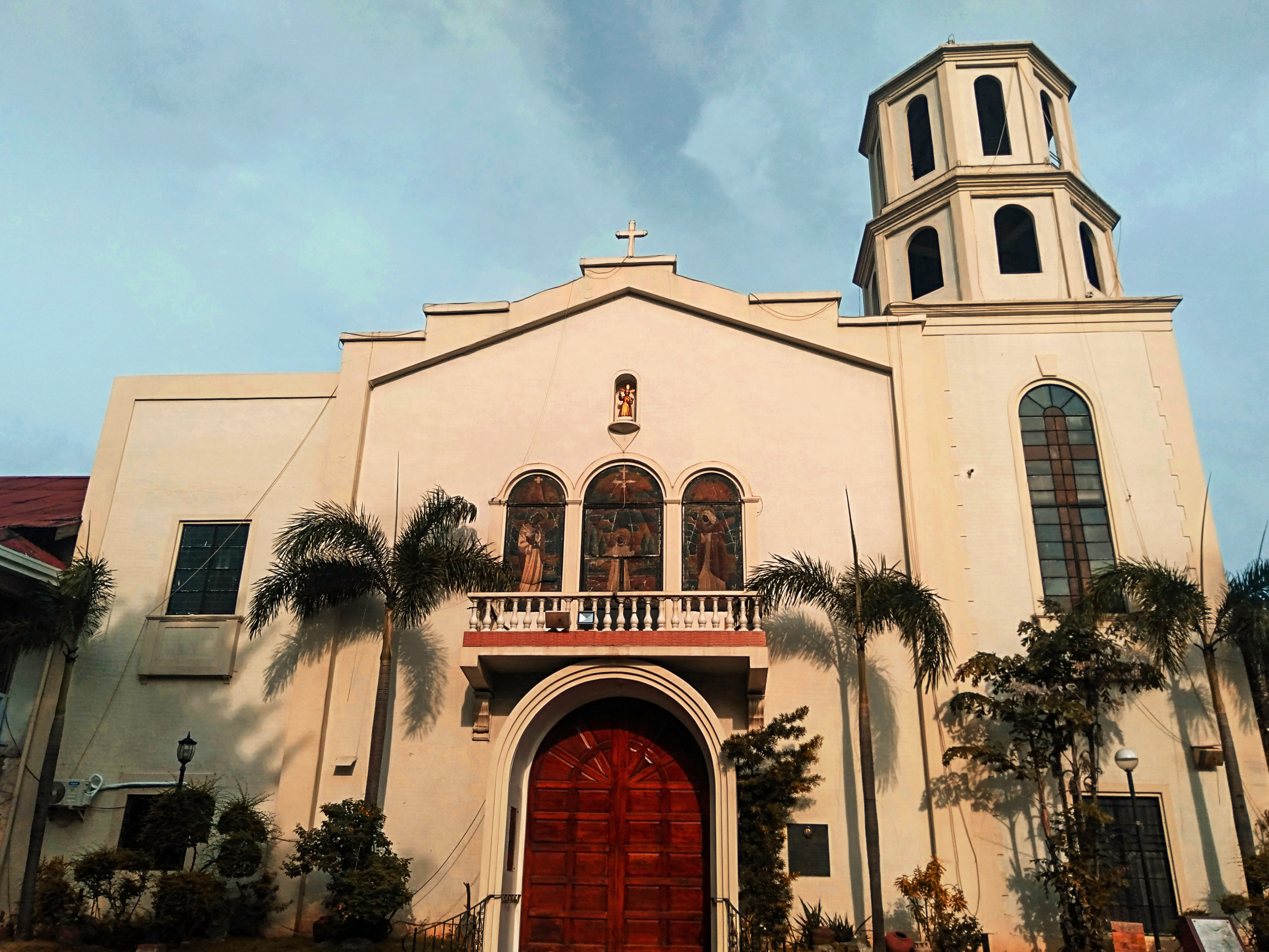
- Church facade in 2019, prior to the 2020 fire
- Pandacan Church
- 14°35′35″N 121°00′14″E
- Location: Pandacan, Manila
- Country: Philippines
- Denomination: Roman Catholic
- Website: Pandacan Church

History
- Status: Parish church
- Founded: 1712
- Dedication: Santo Niño
- Events: Buling-Buling Festival

Architecture
- Functional status: Destroyed; under re-construction
- Architectural type: Church building
- Years built: 1732–1760 (original)
- Groundbreaking: July 10, 2021; 5 years ago (reconstruction)
- Demolished: 2020; 6 years ago (original)

Administration
- Archdiocese: Manila
- Deanery: San Fernando de Dilao
- Parish: Santo Niño de Pandacan

Clergy
- Vicar: Joseph Mary Sigfred S. Arellano
- Priest: Andy O. Lim

Santo Niño de Pandacan Parish, commonly known as Pandacan Church, (Note: Filipino: Simbahan ng Pandacan; Spanish: Iglesia Parroquial de Pandacan) is a Roman Catholic parish church in the district of Pandacan in Manila, Philippines. The church was established as an independent parish church in 1712 from the parish of Sampaloc. Completed in 1760, it housed the original image of the Santo Niño de Pandacan until it was destroyed by a fire in 2020. The church is currently undergoing reconstruction.

The church celebrates its liturgical feast on the third Sunday of January. It is under the jurisdiction of the Archdiocese of Manila under the Vicariate of San Fernando de Dilao.

== History ==
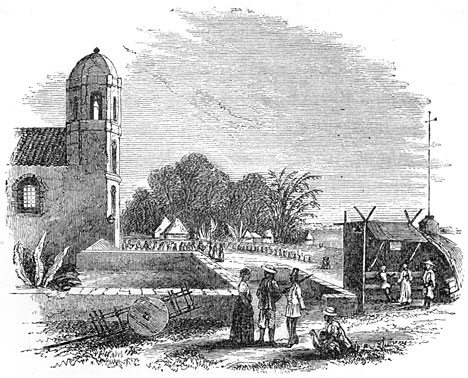
Pandacan Church in the early 1800s, by Paul de la Gironière

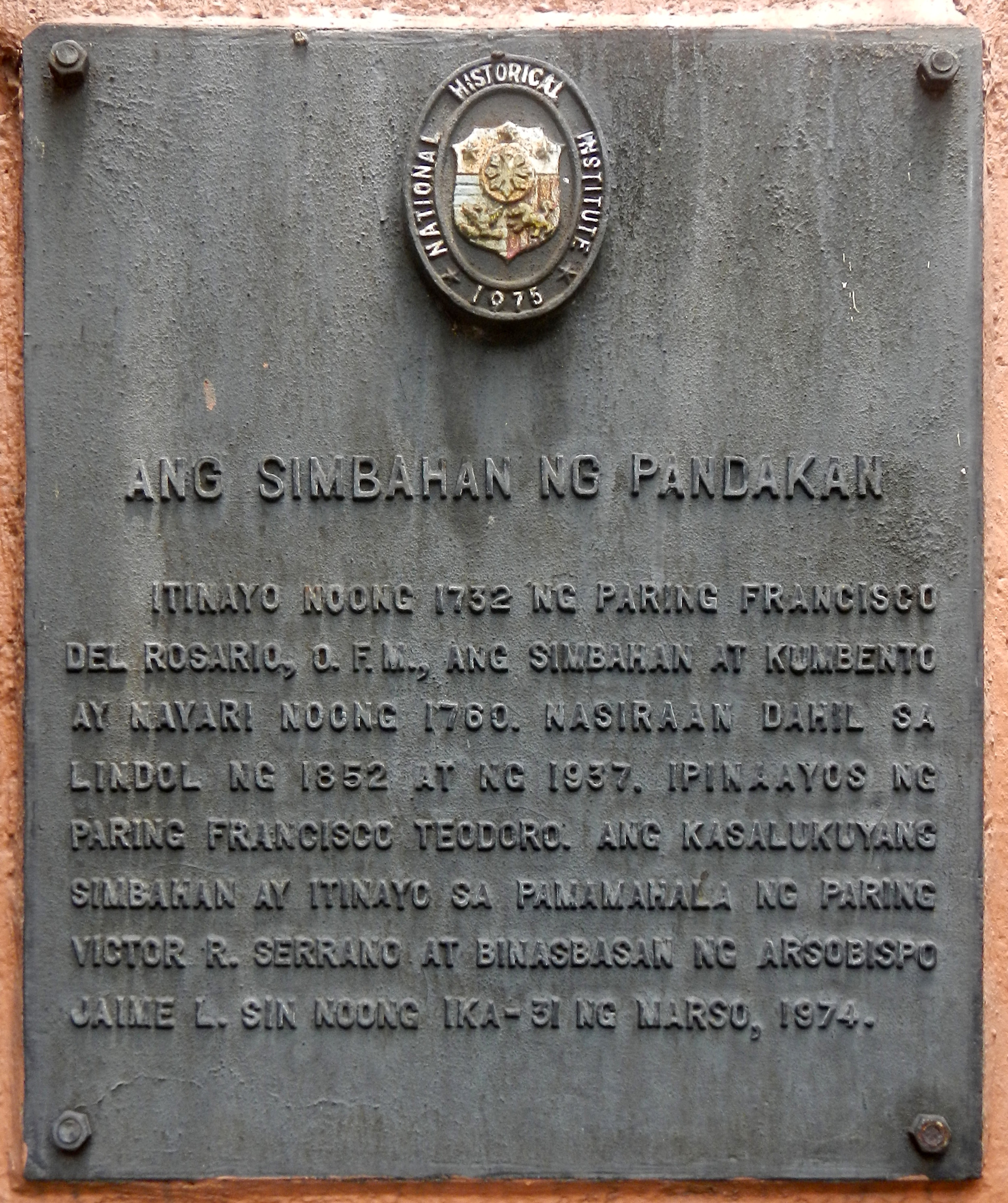
Church NHI historical marker installed in 1975

The image of the Holy Child of Jesus, also popularly known as Santo Niño, was enshrined at the church and its feast is traditionally celebrated on the third Sunday of January. In the early 1600s, this image was found by little children playing and was recovered from a well near the church. As Pandacan was at the time, under the parish of Sampaloc, the image was enshrined at the Sampaloc Church. It suddenly disappeared in Sampaloc, only to be found at the exact same site the image was originally found. When it was brought back to Sampaloc, it disappeared again and was found again in Pandacan.

Believing that the miraculous image wanted a home in Pandacan, a visita (chapel-of-ease) was built, constructed at the very same site the image was built. A spring of water was unearthed and a well, called "The Well of the Holy Child", was made. Many miracles and healing of the sick were attributed to the water from the well, and devotion to the Santo Niño de Pandacan grew and became popular. The well has long been sealed due to pollutants but a shrine stands on what was once the well.

Pandacan Church became an independent parish from Sampaloc in 1712.

The first stone church in Pandacan was built in 1732 by Francisco del Rosario. The church would take 30 years to complete. The original church, completed in 1760, was twice destroyed by earthquakes. A modern church stood on the ruins including a parish school that stands on what was the Catholic cemetery of the district.

=== 2020 fire and 2021 reconstruction ===
On July 10, 2020, a fire, caused by an electrical fault, destroyed the church. The fire caused damage to the altar and interior. Since the fire, Masses have been held outside of the church, at a patio nearby.

The fire destroyed the 400-year-old Santo Niño de Pandacan image and other religious icons, as well as records, but the tres potencia or the Holy Crown of the image, as well as its burned "andador", scepter, and the image's vestment, were recovered. However, when the ciborium was opened, the host was found to be intact. The ciborium and the hosts were stored in Paco Church for safekeeping.

In January 2021, the church received a new Santo Niño image made of the yakal wooden beam that survived the 2020 fire. The new wooden image was made of Philippine endemic wood, unlike the original image which was said to be made of Mexican wood.

On July 10, 2021, exactly a year after the fire, the Archdiocese of Manila, led by Cardinal Jose Advincula, broke ground for the reconstruction of the church.

== Gallery ==
The church prior to the 2020 fire

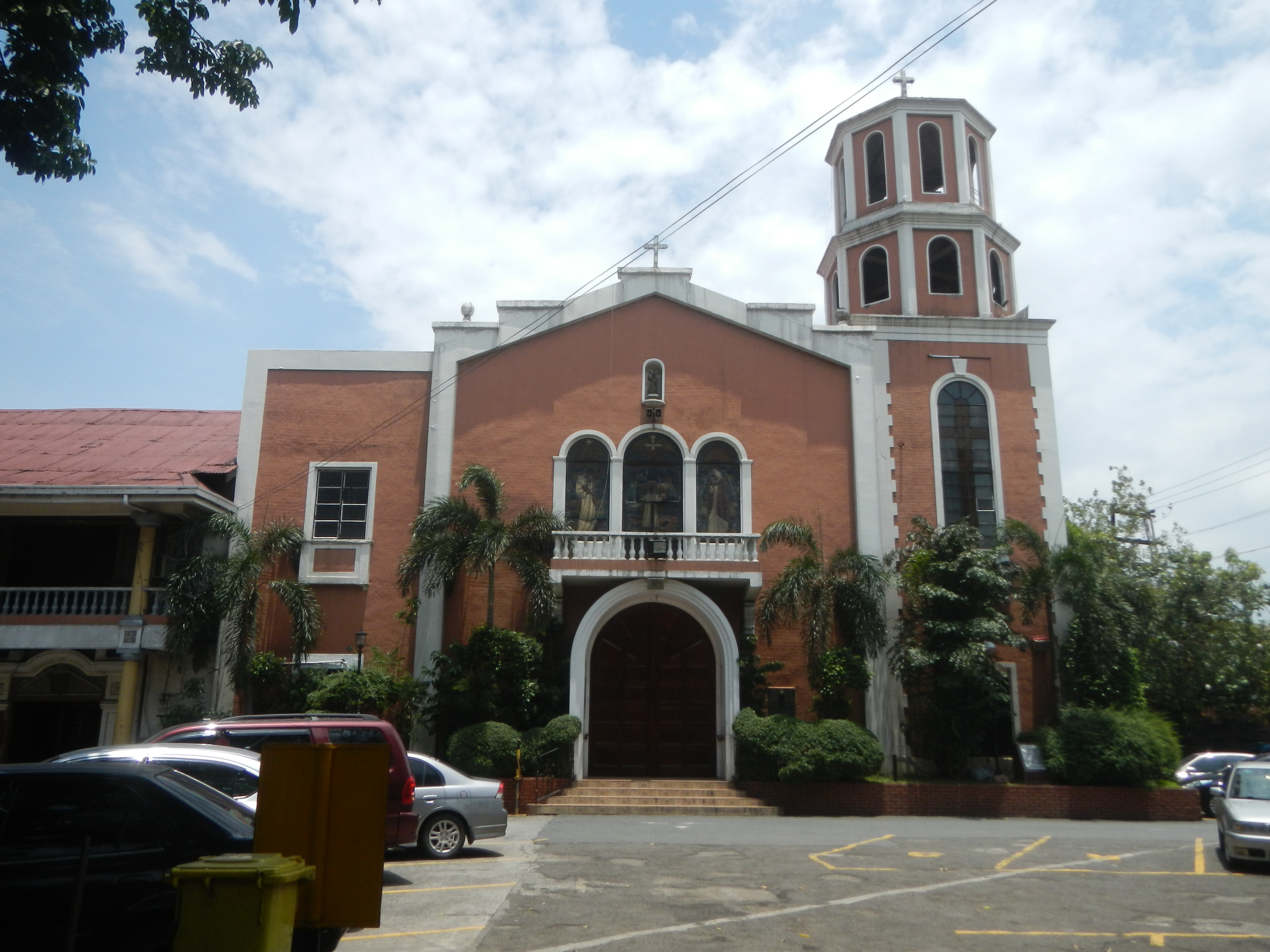
The church in 2016

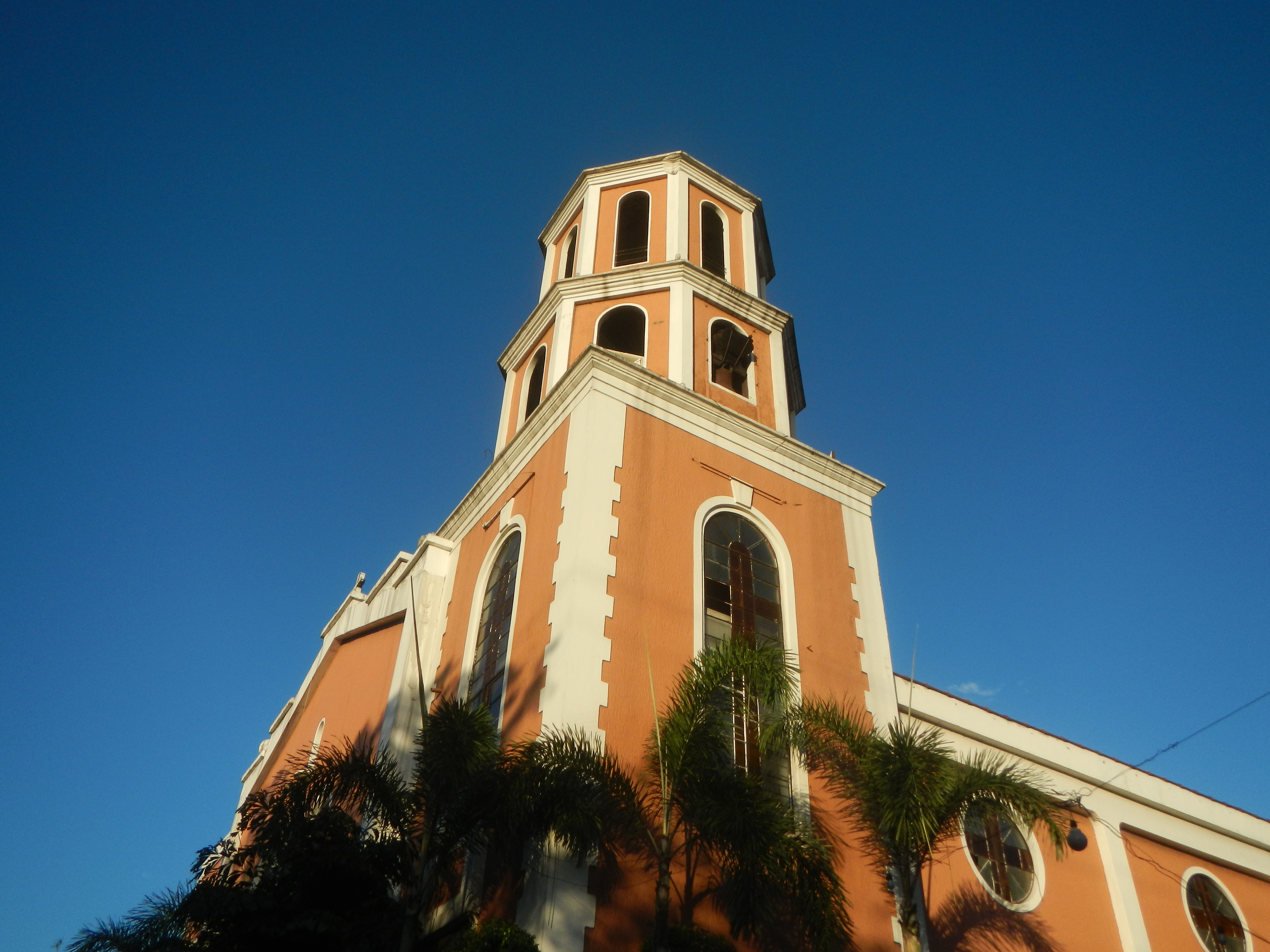
The bell tower

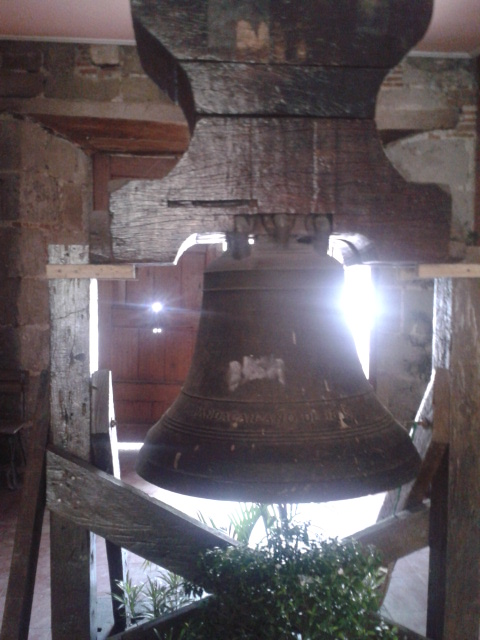
One of the church bells

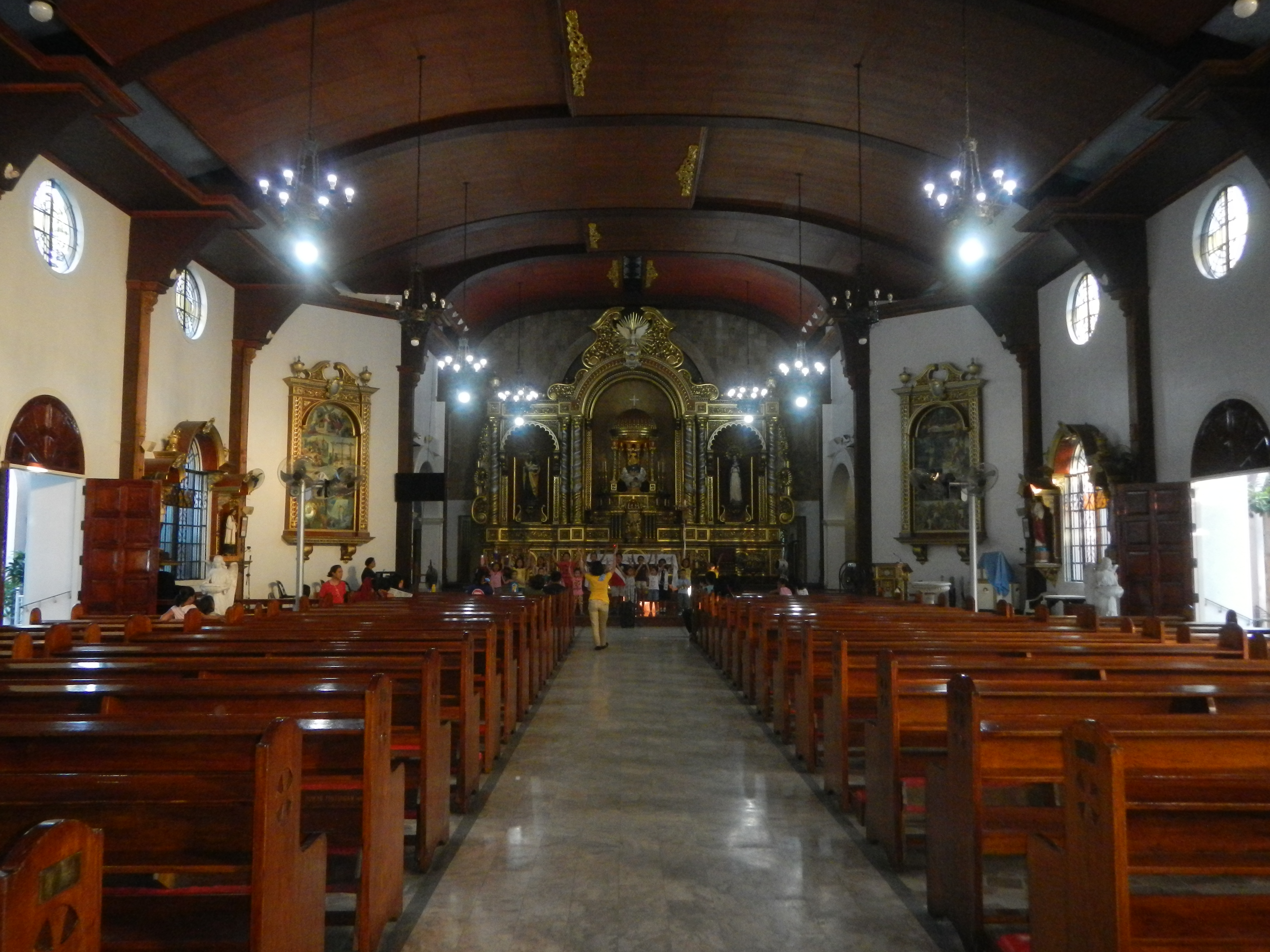
Interior facing the sanctuary

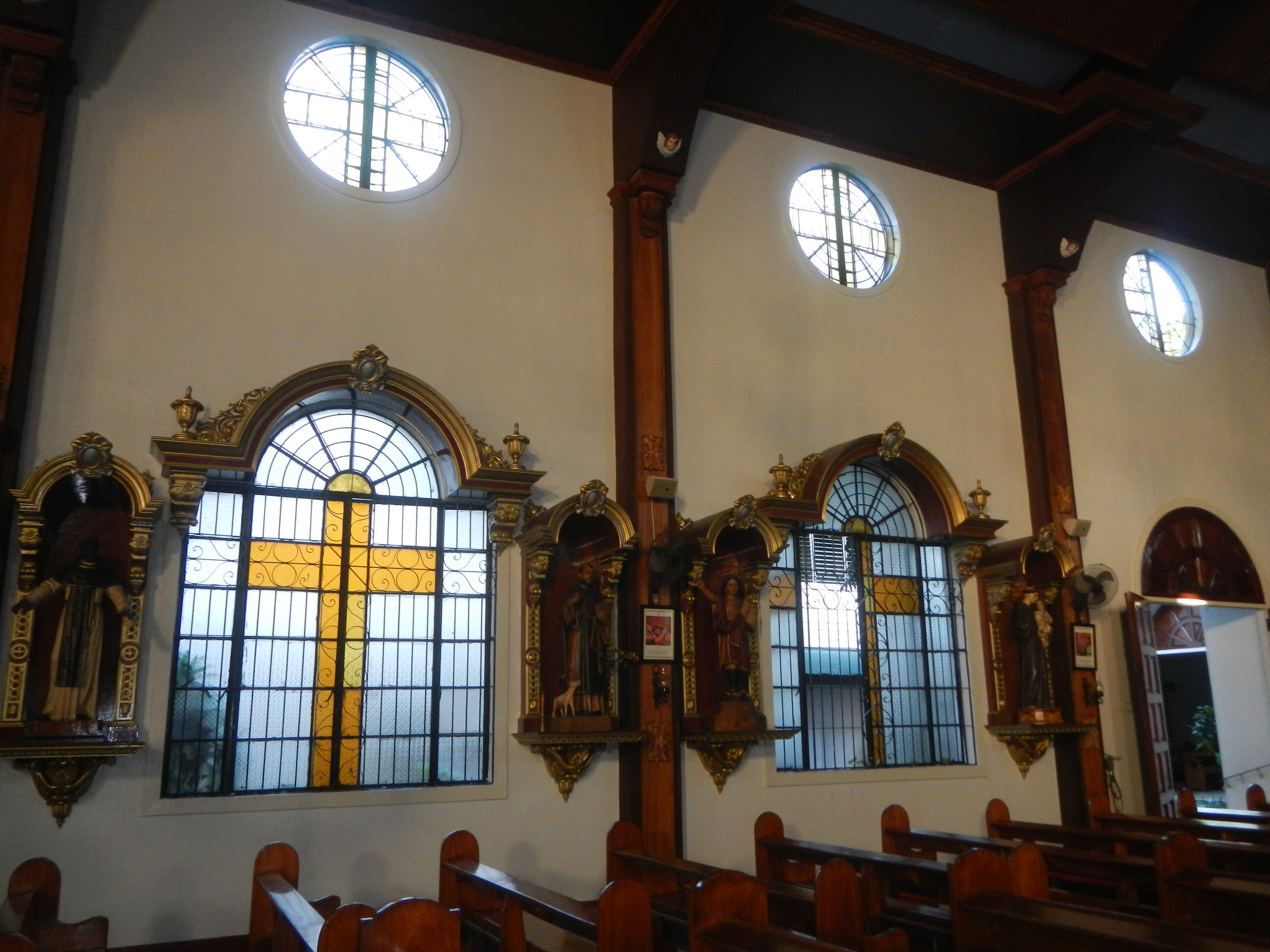
Side wall with the stained windows and religious images

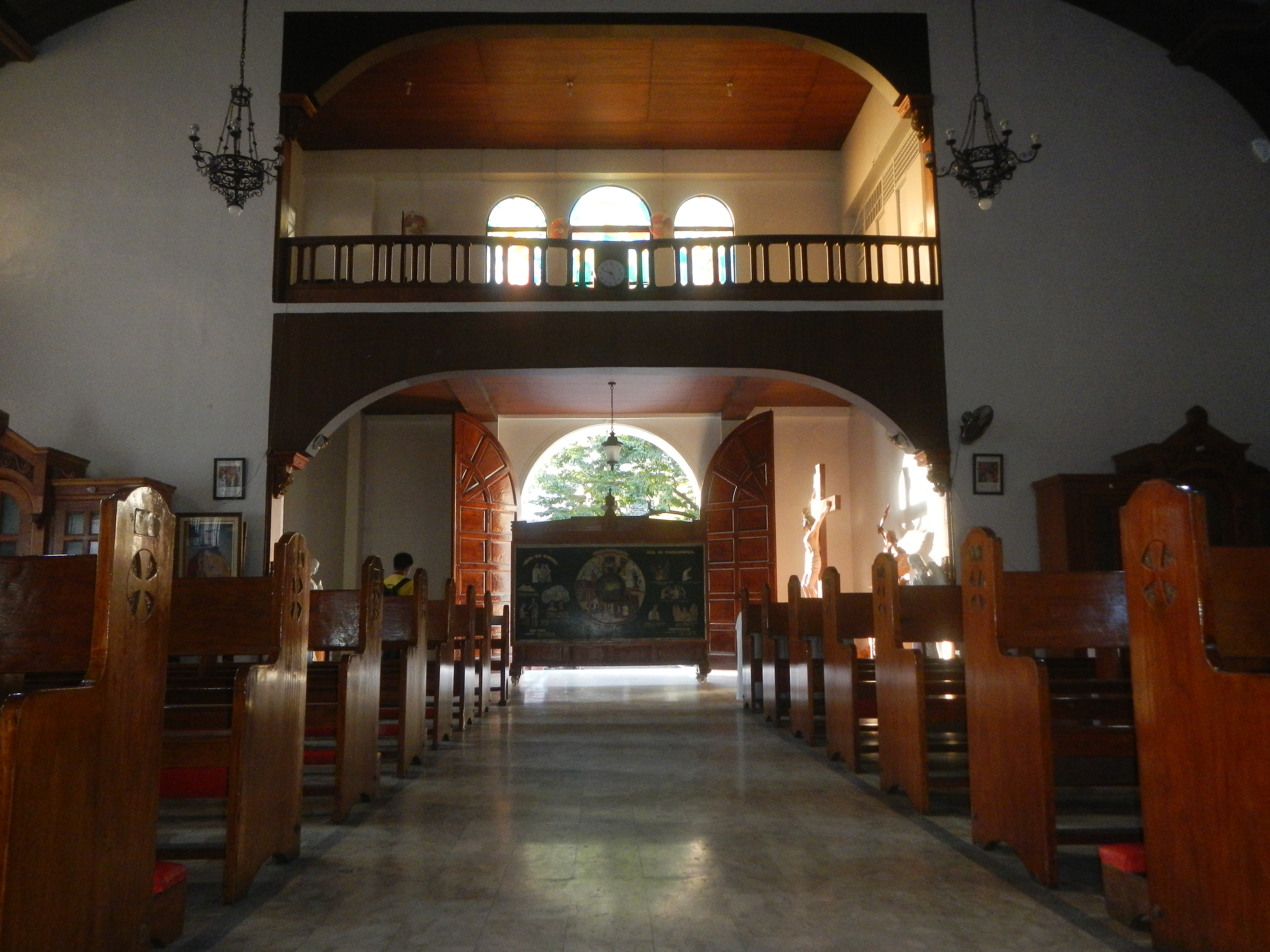
Rear view of the interior

== See also ==
- Basilica del Santo Niño — a minor basilica in Cebu City dedicated to another Holy Child image — the Santo Niño de Cebú
- Tondo Church — a church in Tondo, Manila dedicated to Santo Niño de Tondo
- List of Roman Catholic churches in Metro Manila
- Catholic Church in the Philippines
