= Gallery of city flags in South America =

This page lists the city flags in South America. It is a part of the Lists of city flags, which is split into continents due to its size.

== Argentina ==
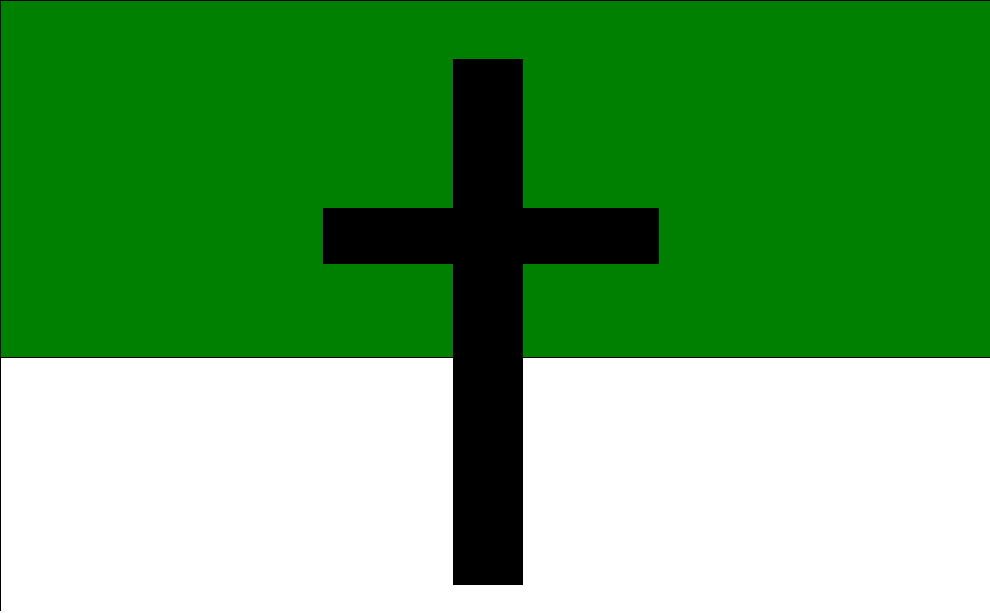
Alderetes

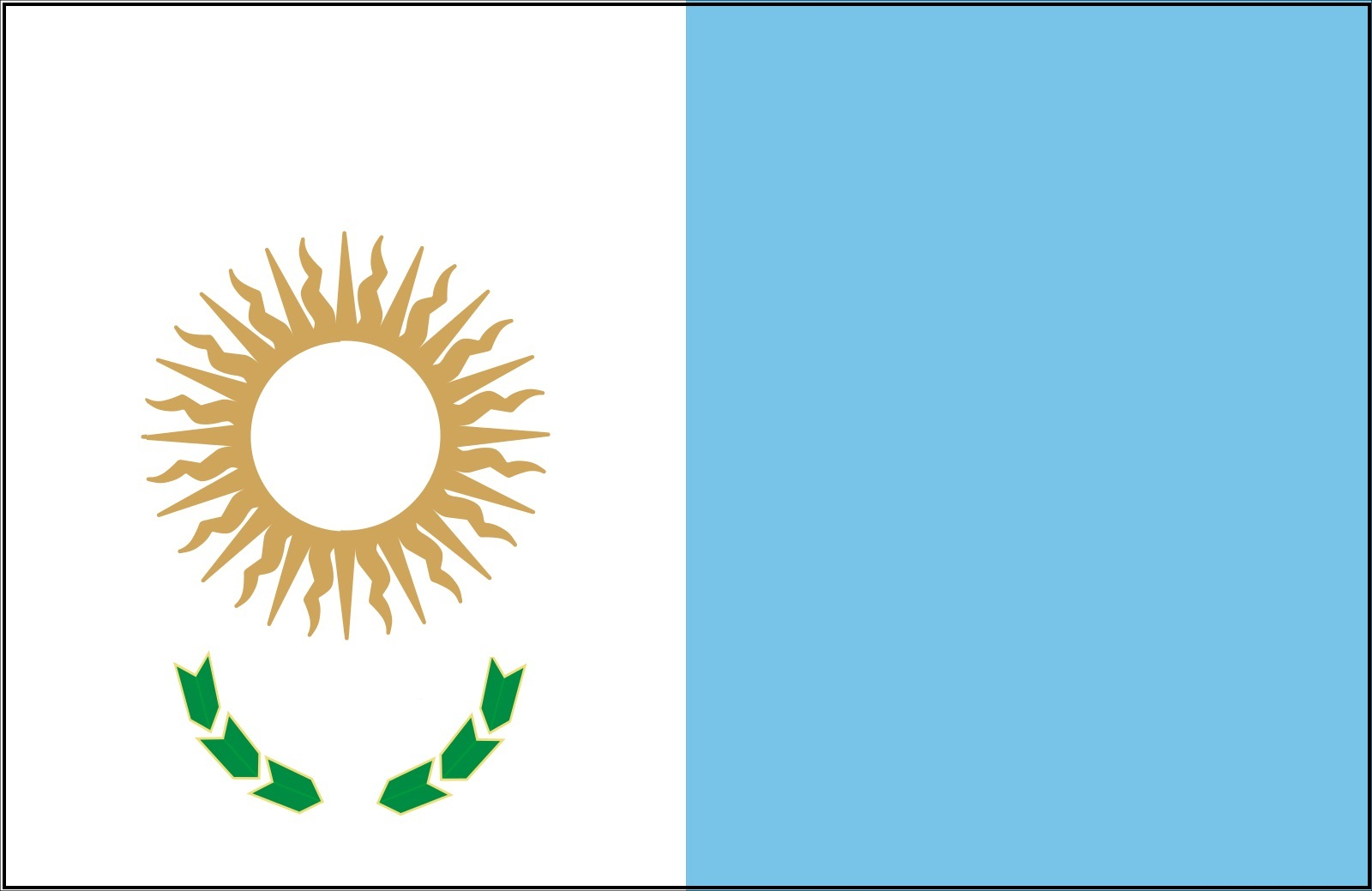
Alta Gracia

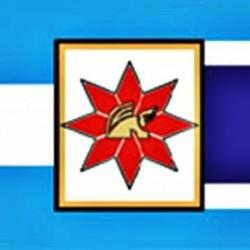
Añatuya

Apóstoles

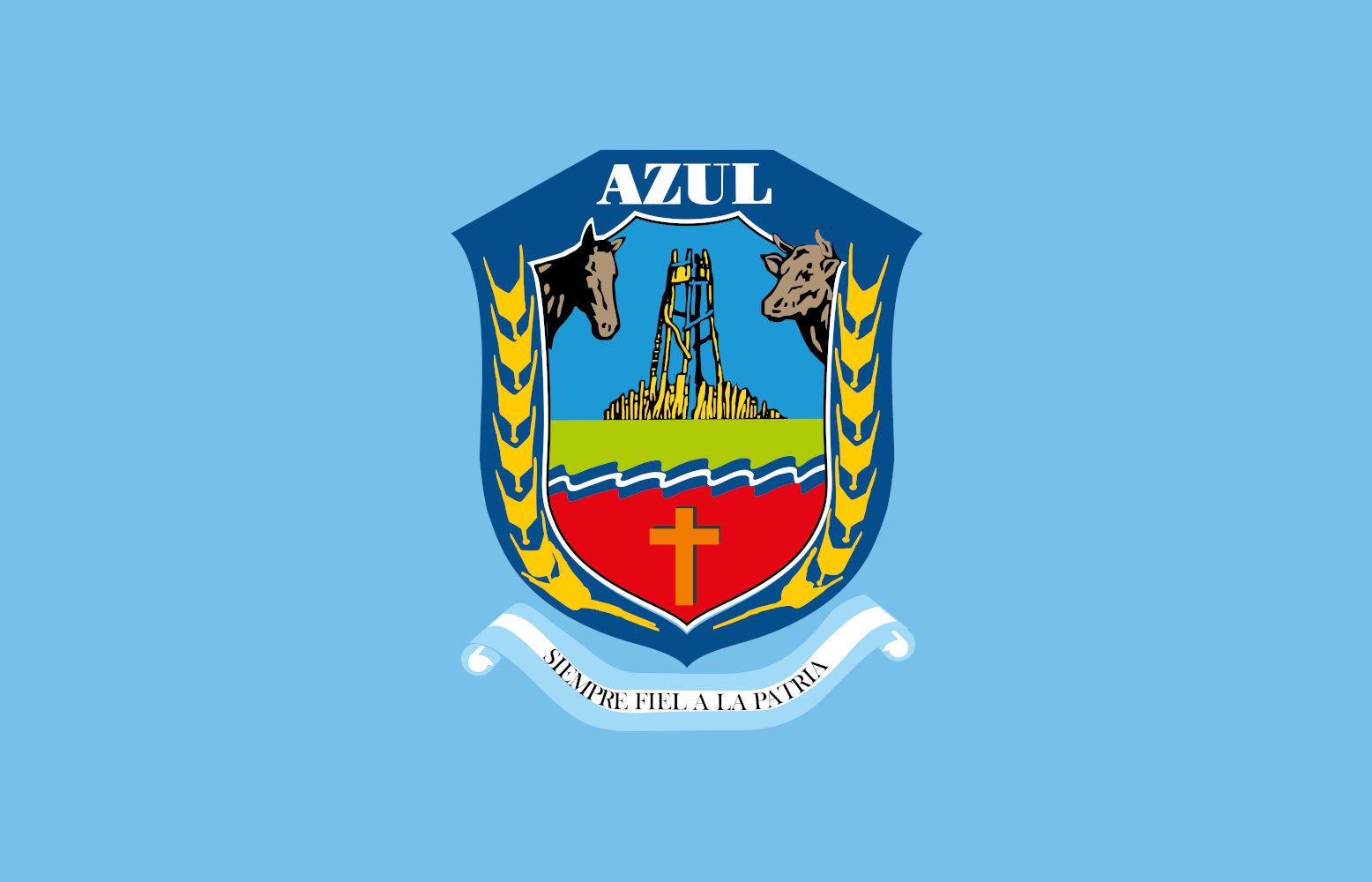
Azul

Bahía Blanca

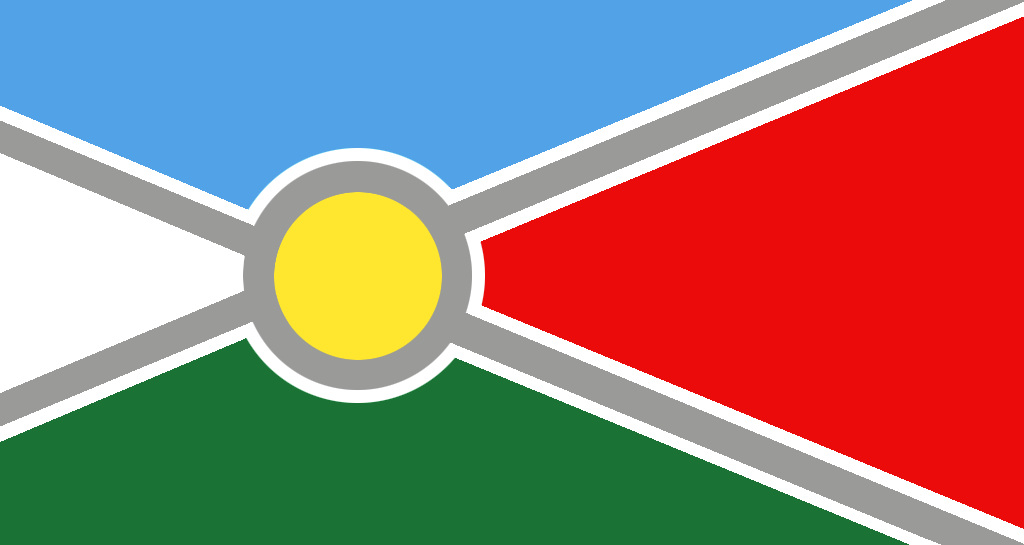
Basavilbaso

Buenos Aires (details)

Carlos Casares

Casilda

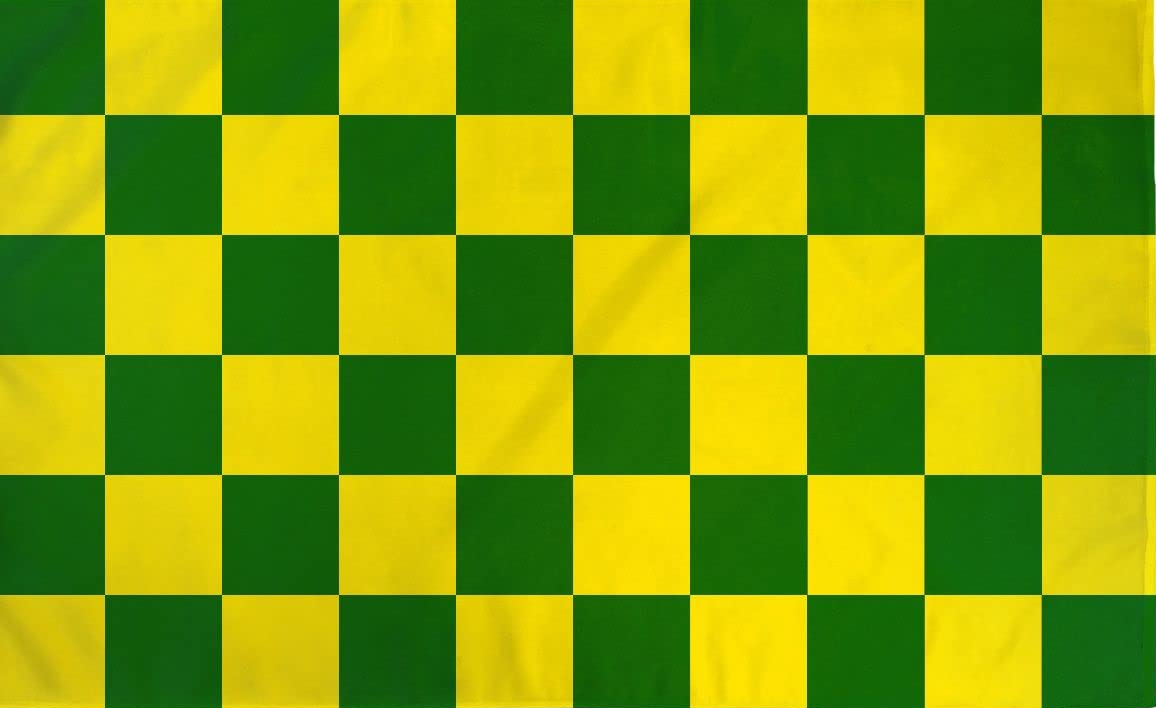
Chilecito

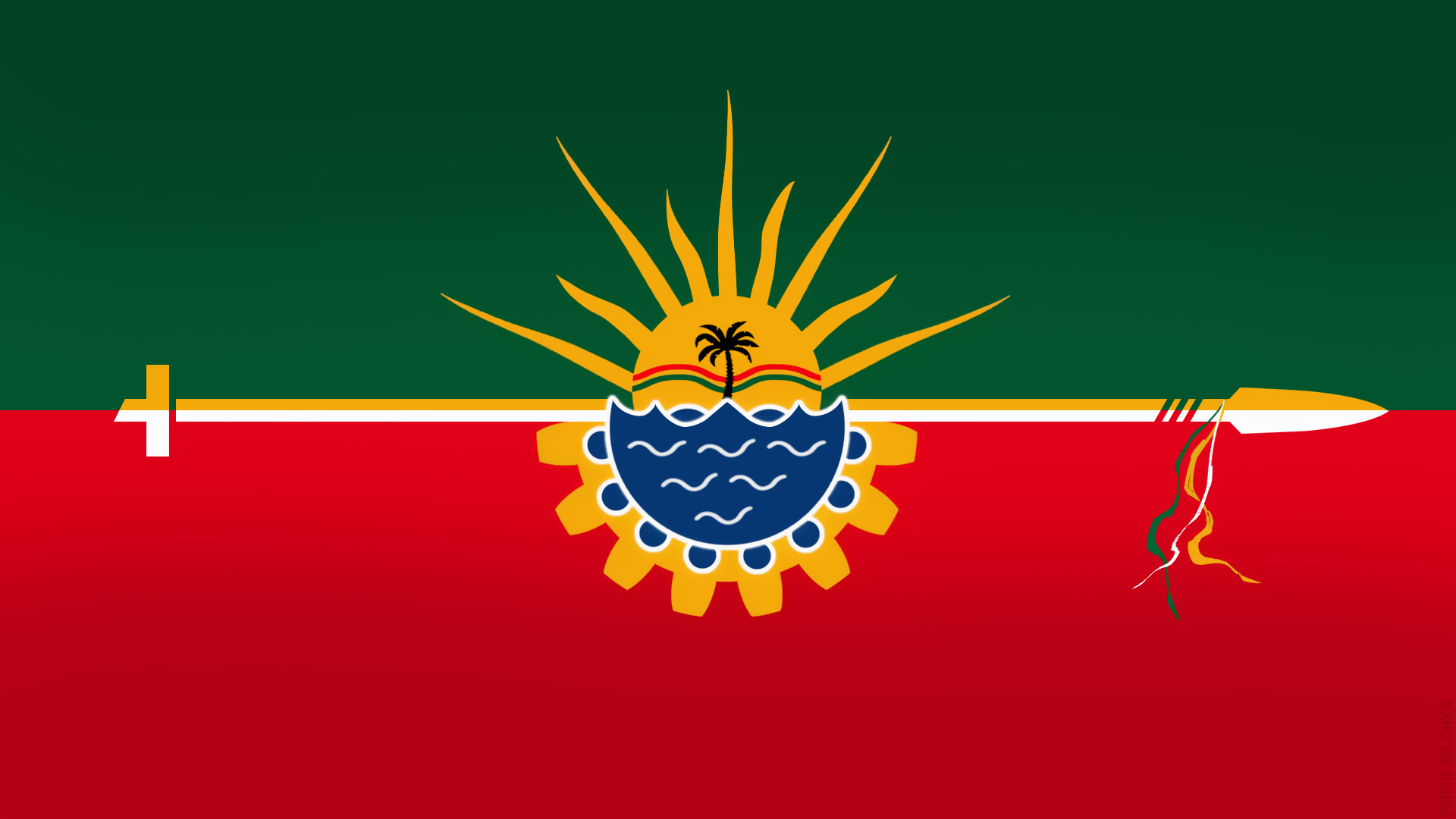
Concordia

Córdoba (details)

Coronda

Corrientes (details)

Curuzú Cuatiá

Deán Funes

Dolavon

El Chaltén

Esperanza

Formosa

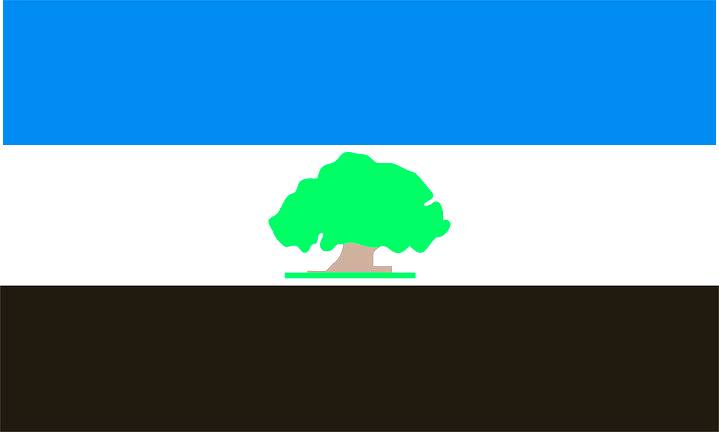
Gerli

Jardín América

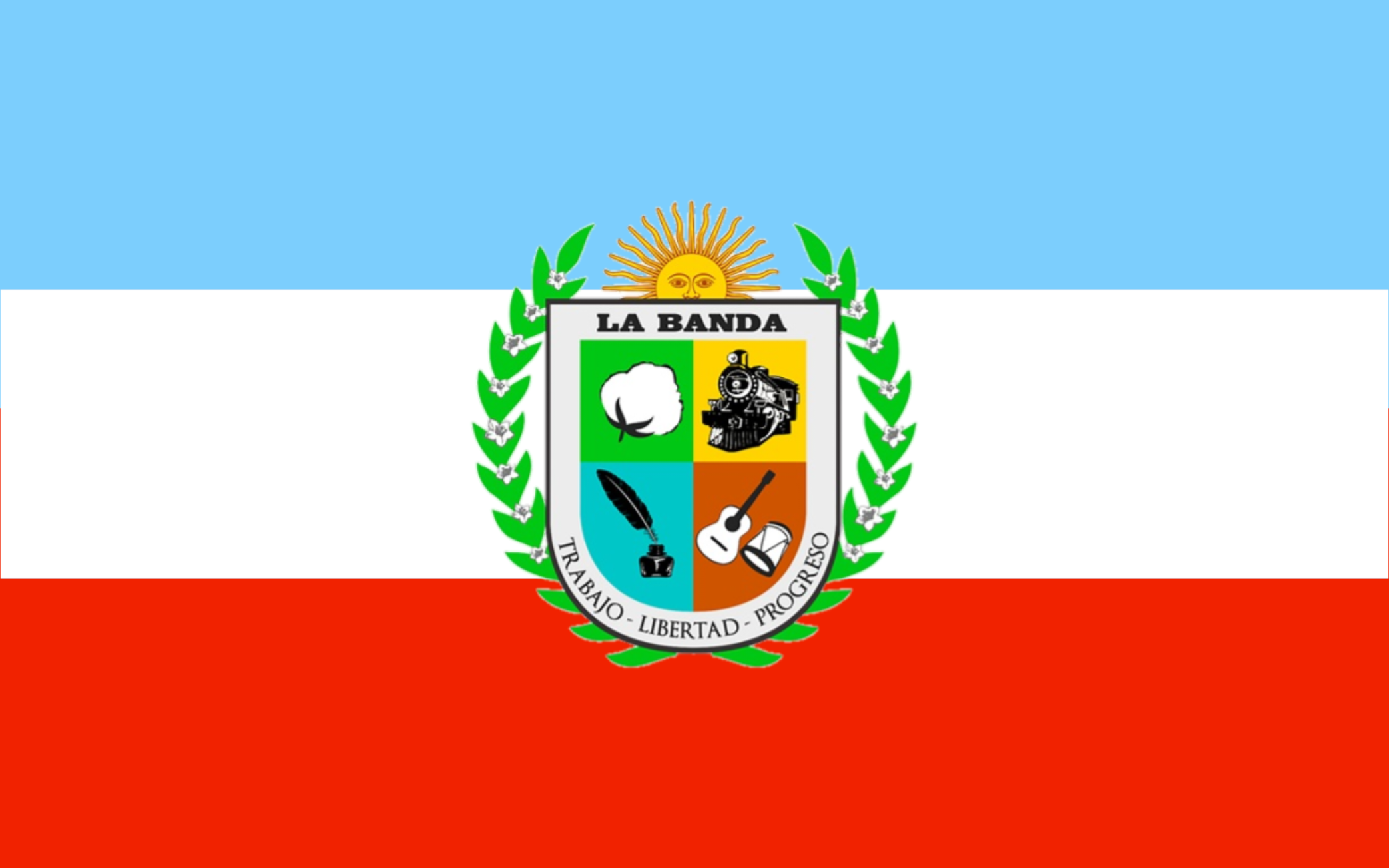
La Banda

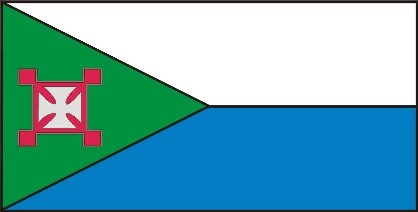
La Carlota

La Falda

Laguna Larga

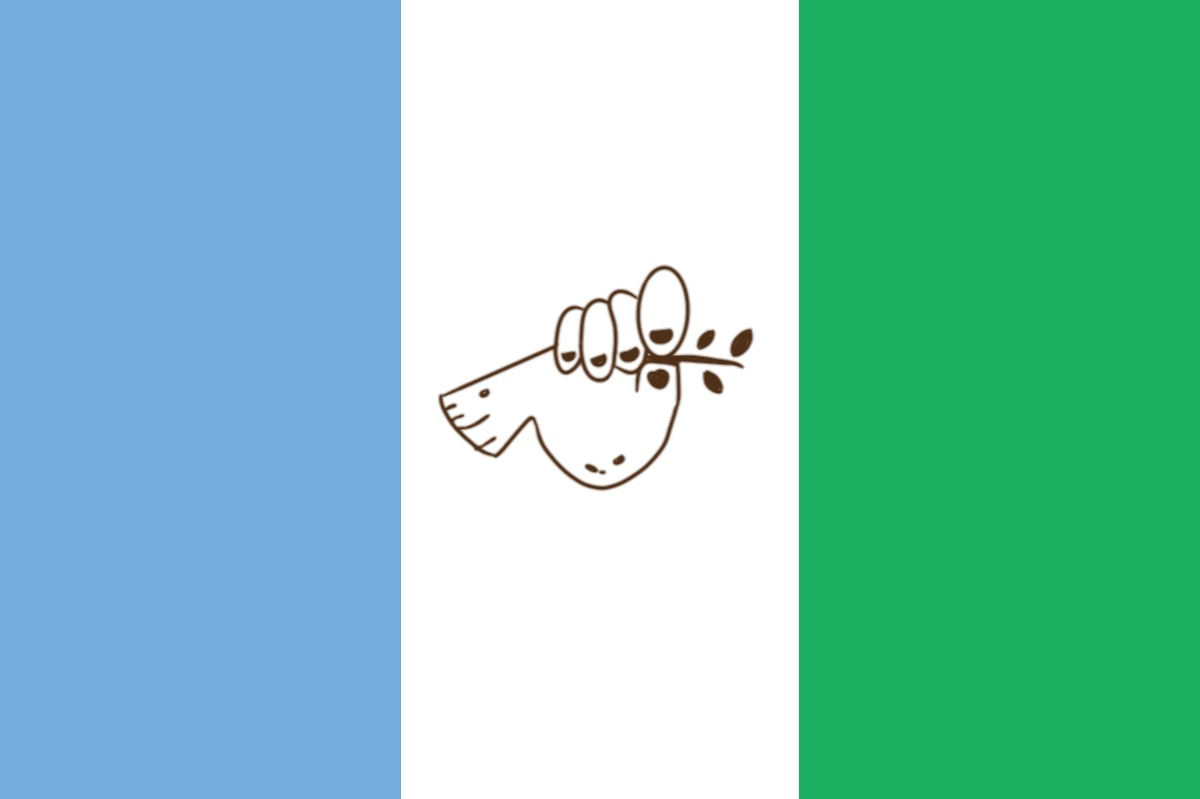
La Paz

La Plata

Las Flores

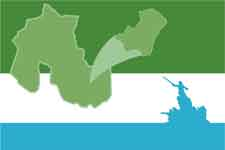
Libertador General San Martín

Loreto

Mar del Plata

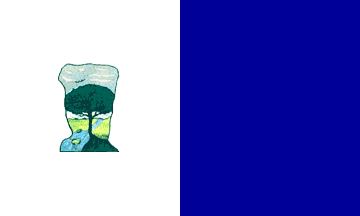
Mercedes

Mina Clavero

Neuquén

Oberá

Paraná

Pilar

Posadas

Puerto Madryn

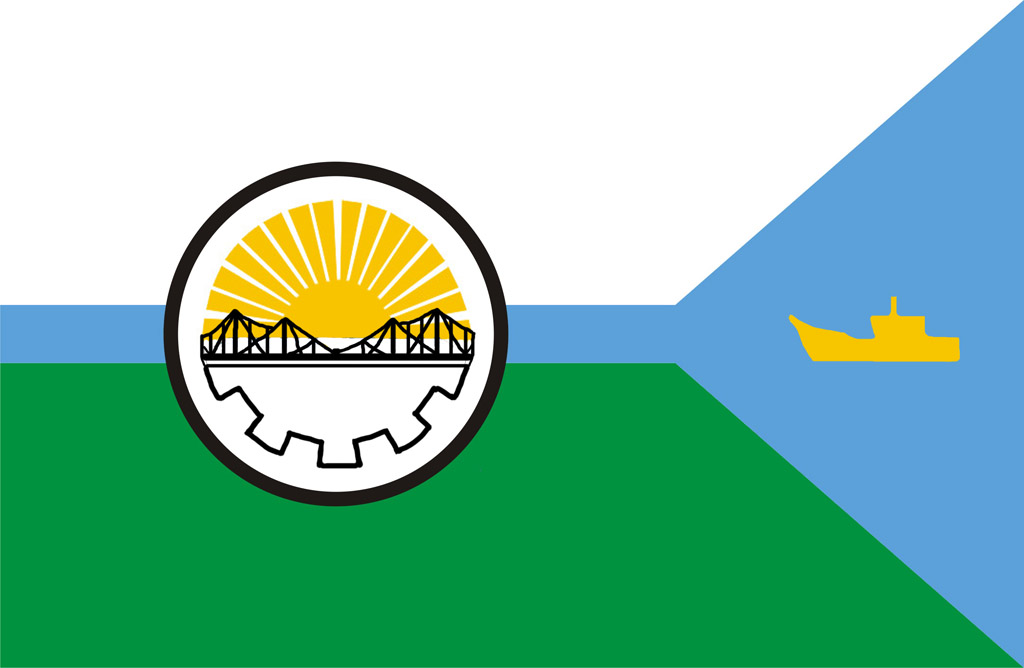
Rawson

Reconquista

Resistencia (details)

Río Cuarto

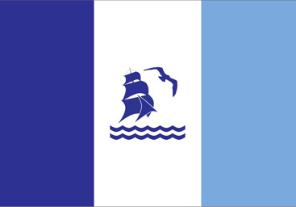
Río Gallegos

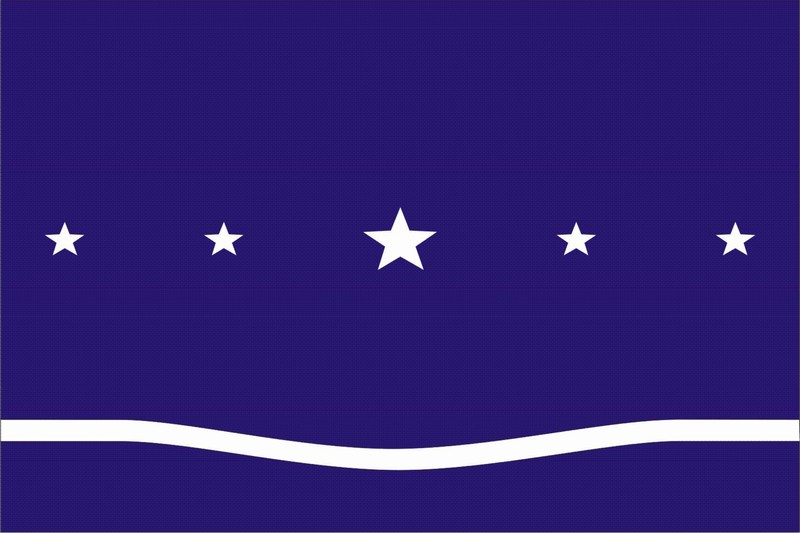
Río Tercero

Rojas

Rosario

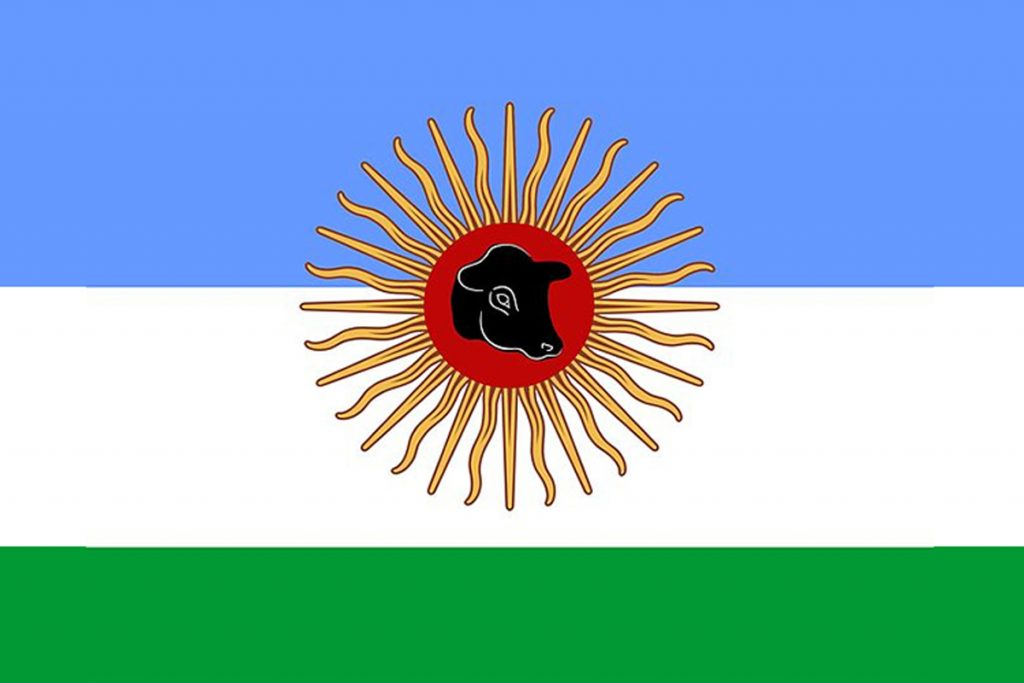
Salliqueló

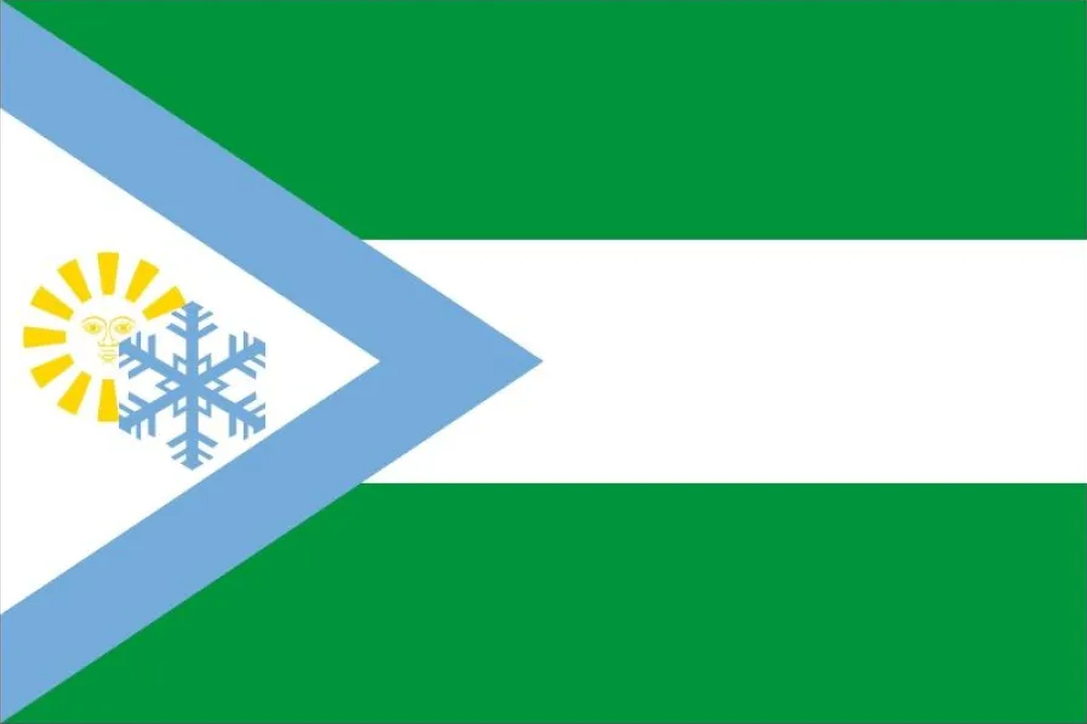
San Carlos de Bariloche

San Cristóbal

San Fernando del Valle de Catamarca

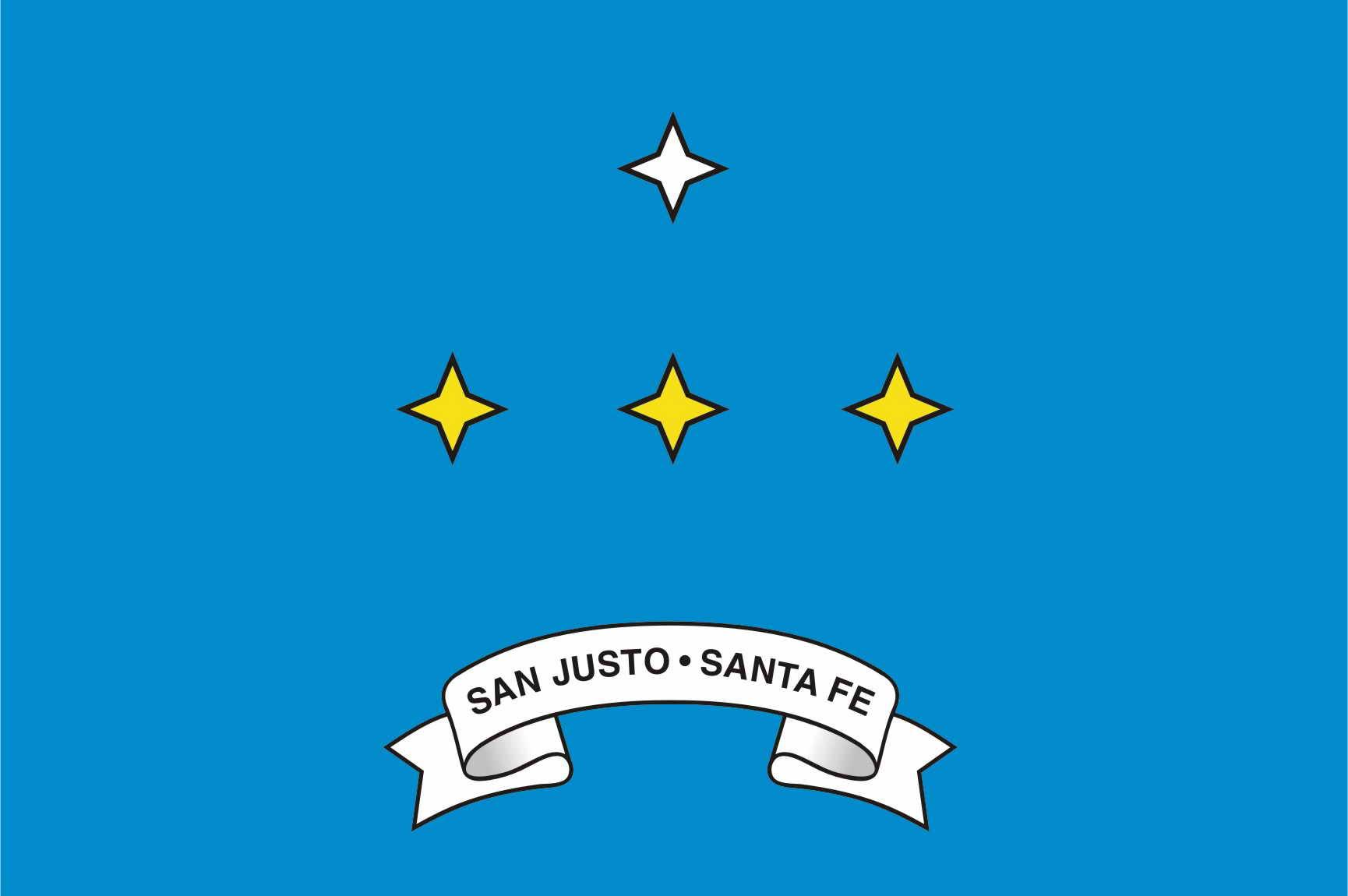
San Justo

San Luis

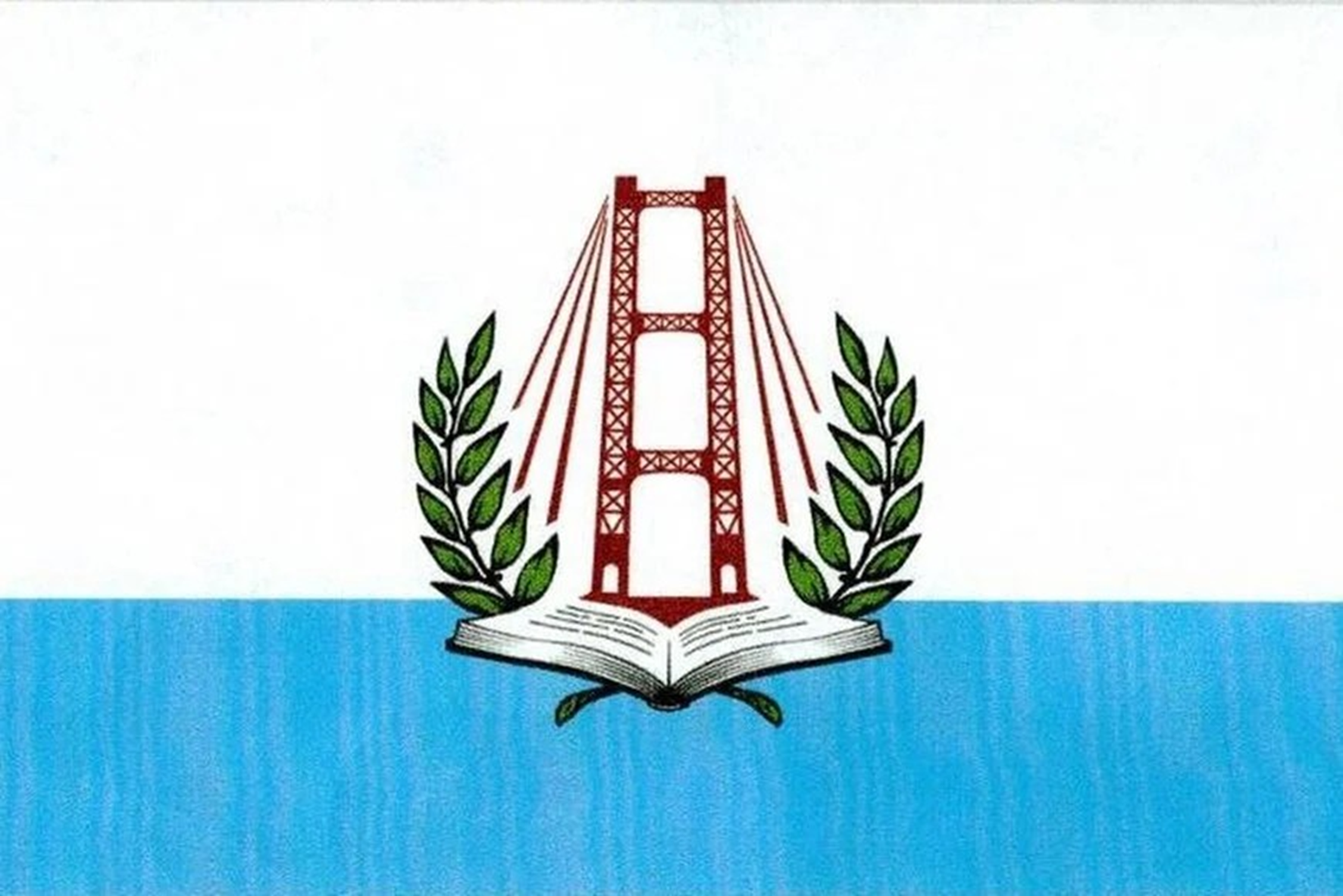
Santa Fe de la Vera Cruz

Santiago del Estero

Tolhuin

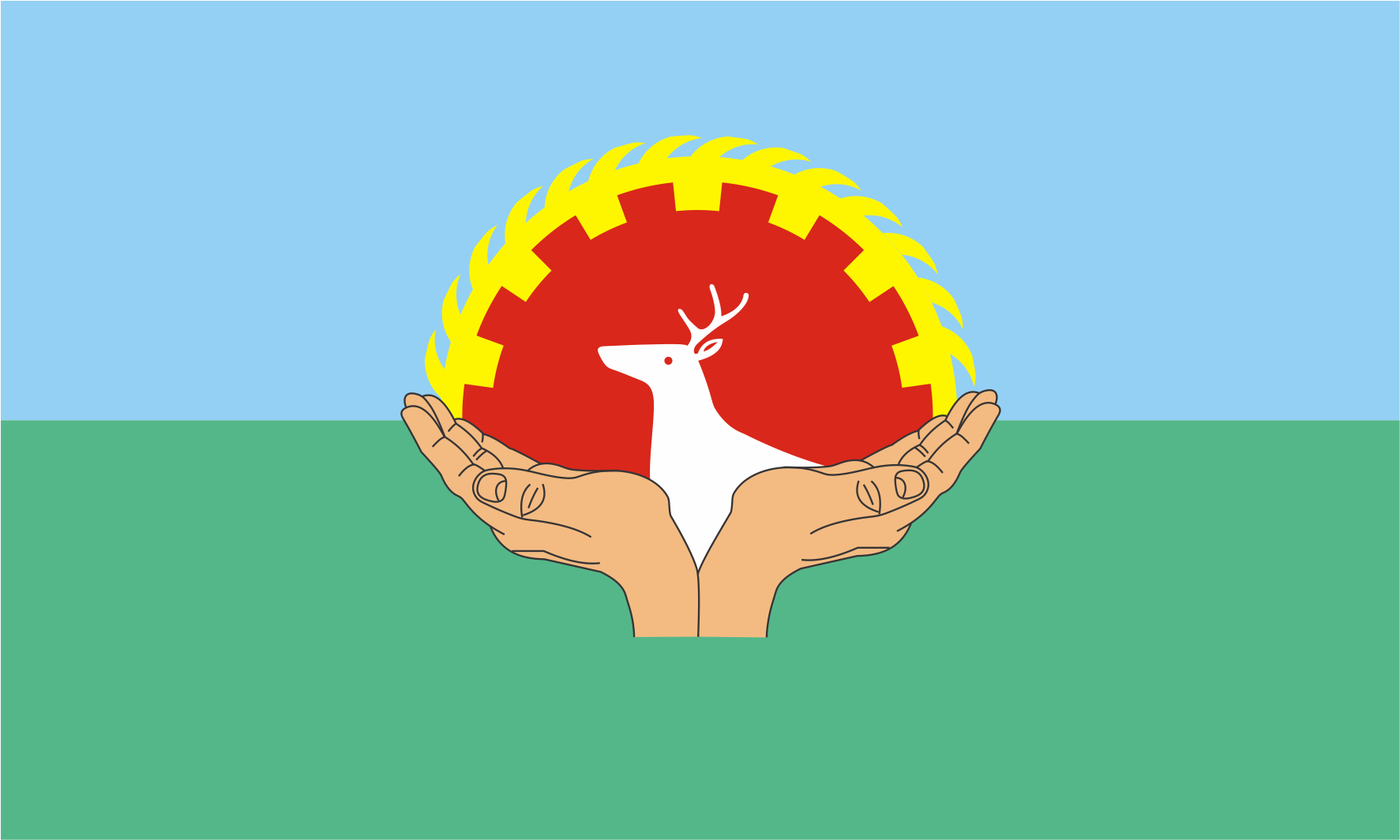
Venado Tuerto

Villa Carlos Paz

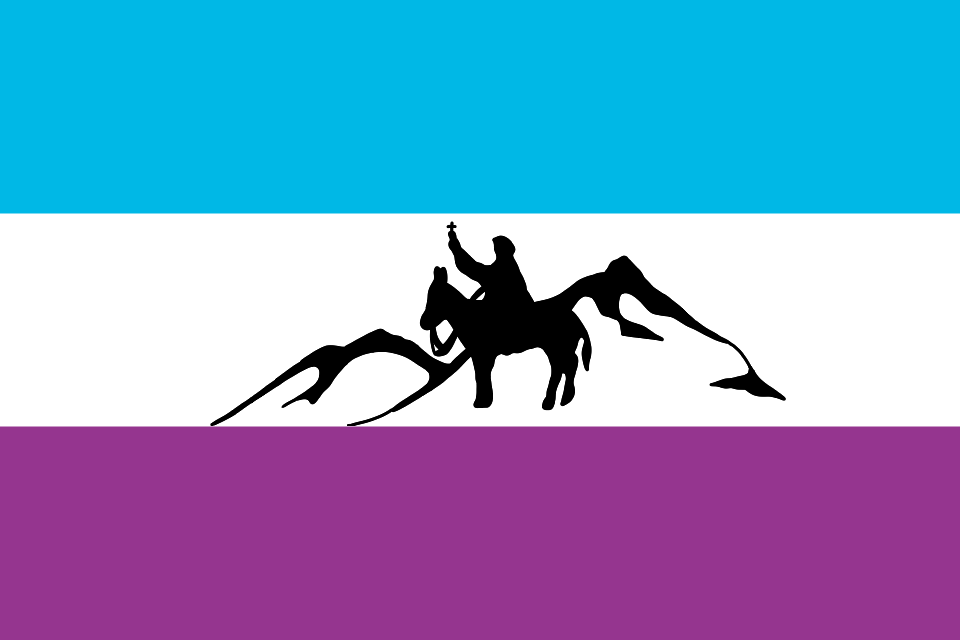
Villa Cura Brochero

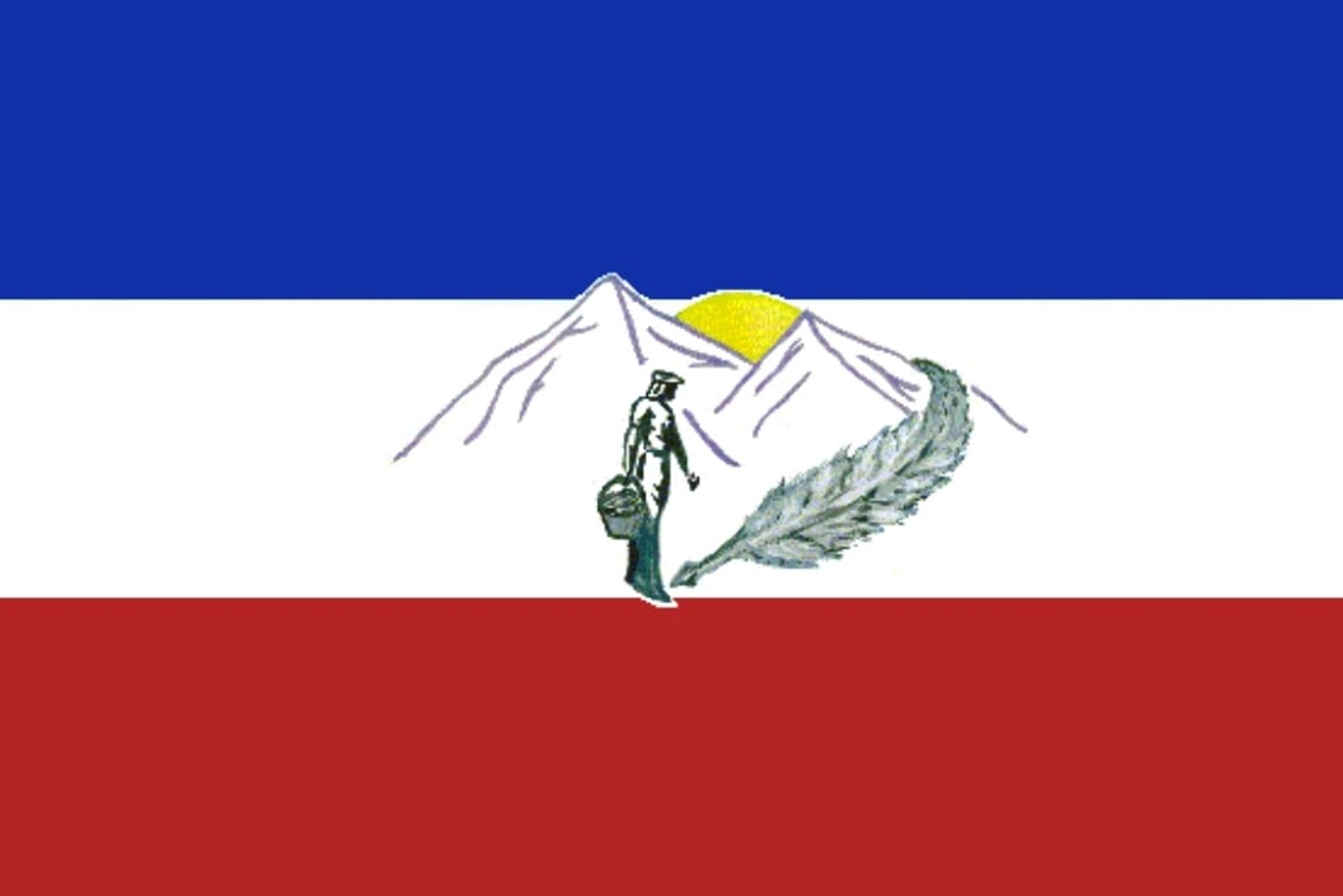
Villa Dolores

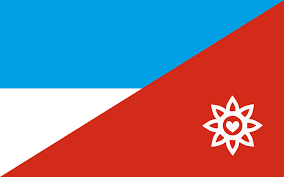
Villa General Belgrano

Villa Giardino

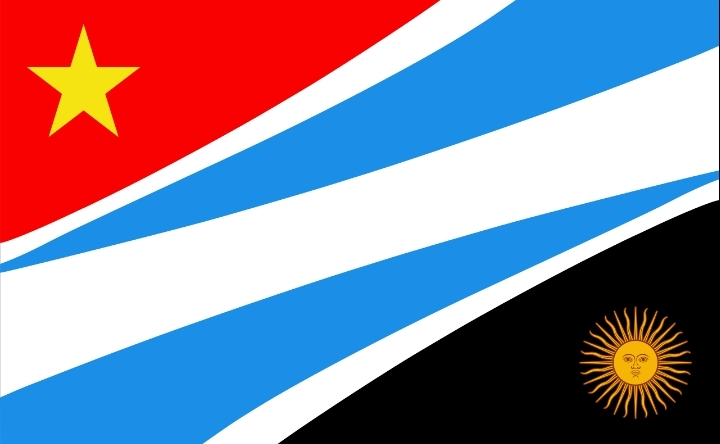
Villaguay

Villa María

== Bolivia ==
Anzaldo

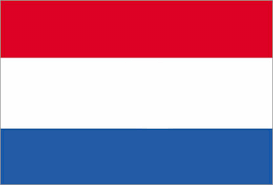
Apolo

Aranjuez

Atocha

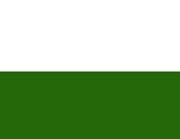
Caracollo

Cobija

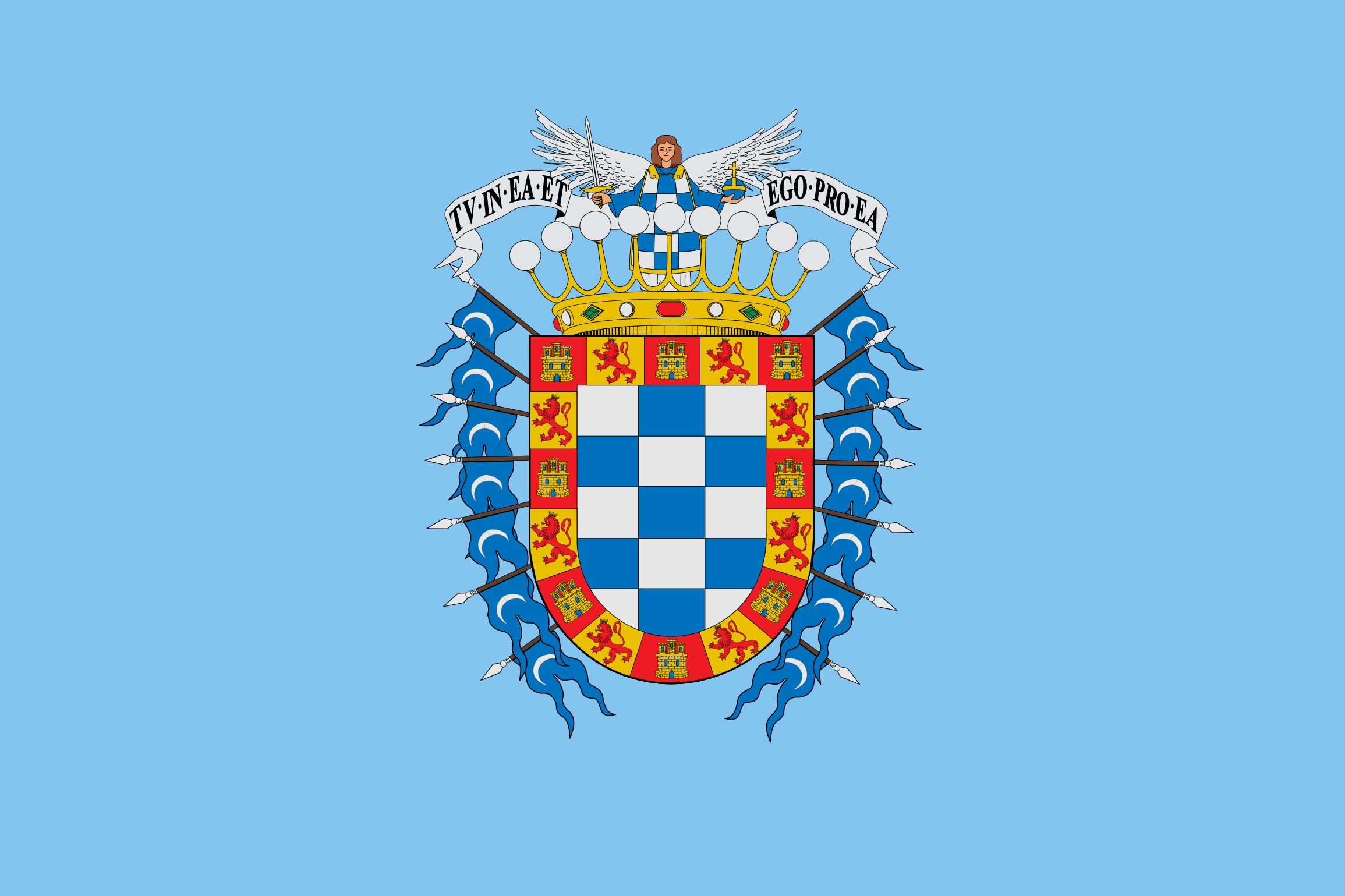
Cochabamba

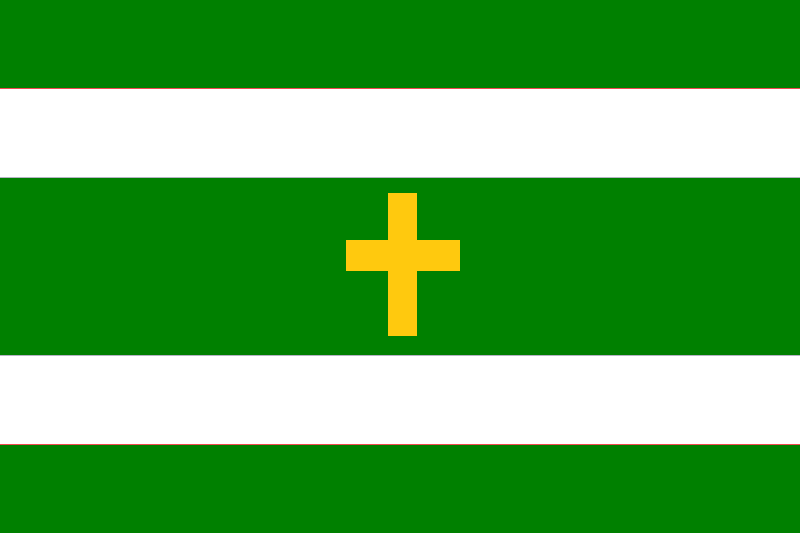
Cotoca

El Alto

El Torno

La Paz (details)

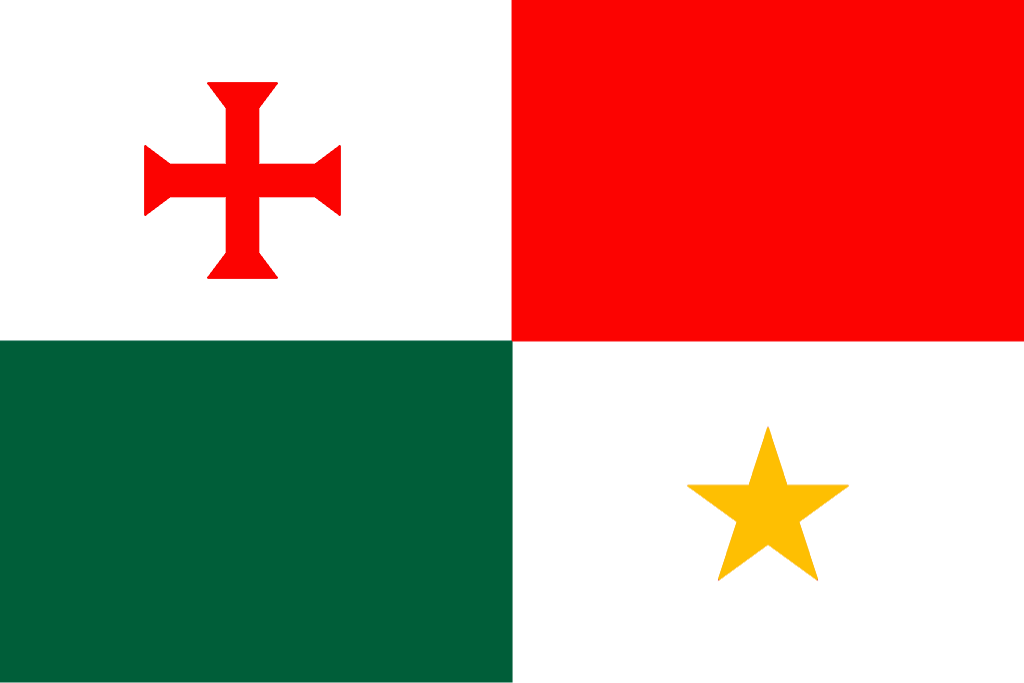
Montero

Oruro

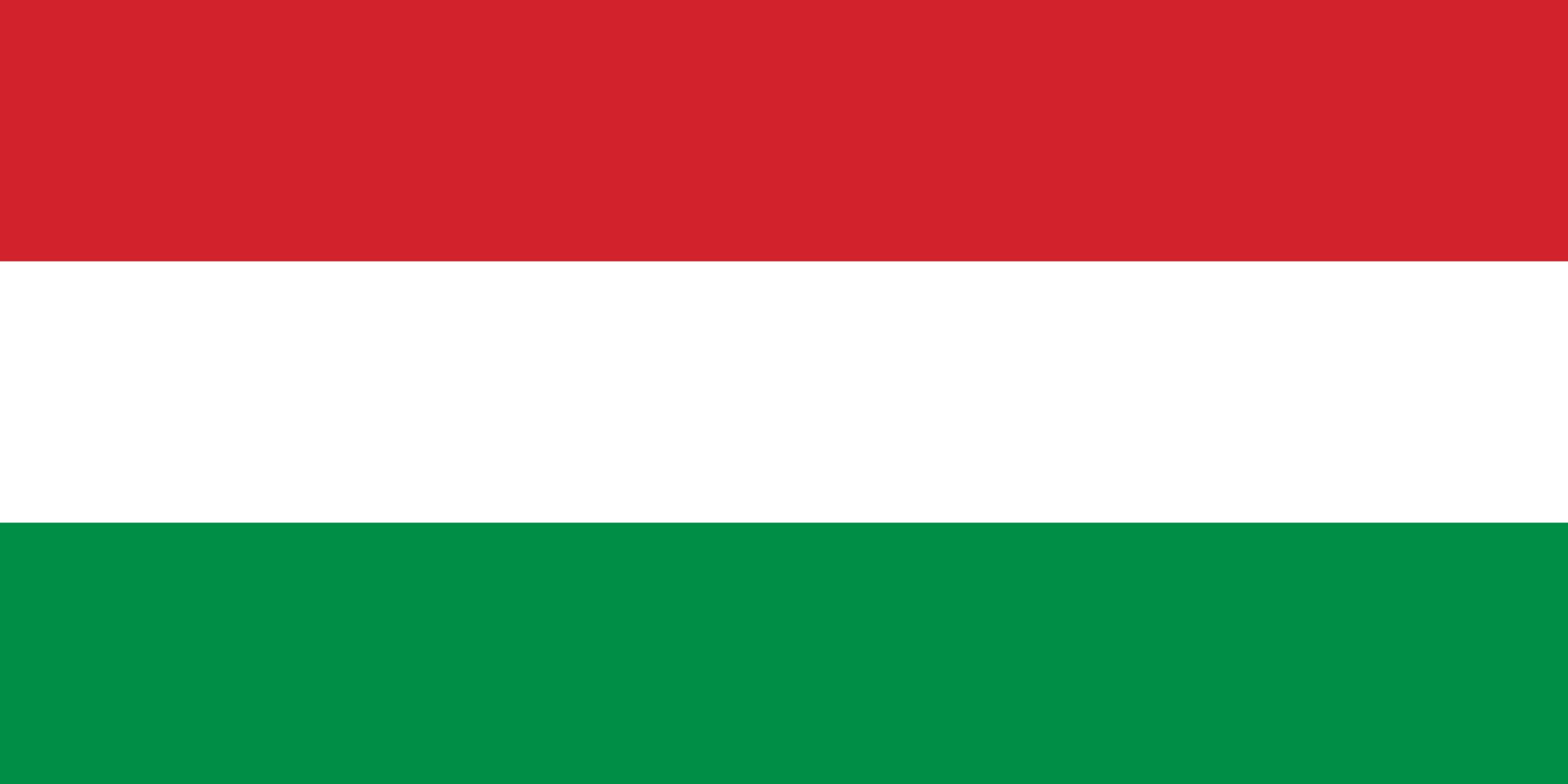
Pailón

Portachuelo

Potosí

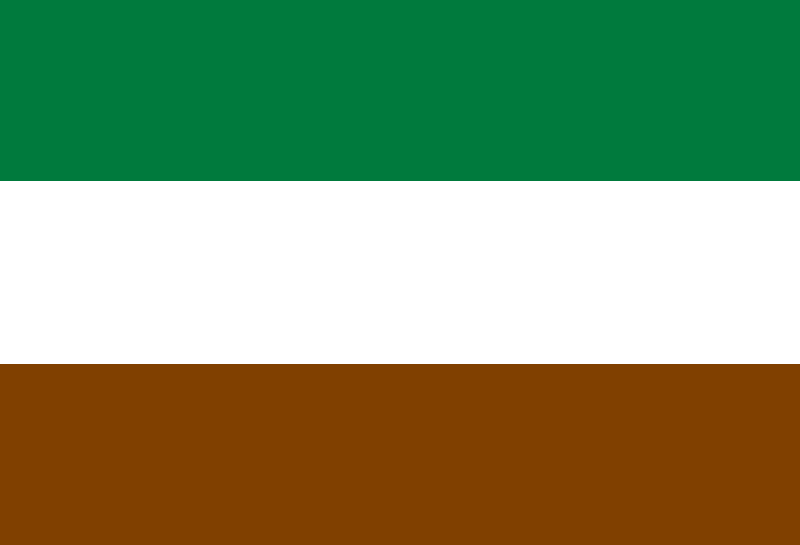
Puerto Suárez

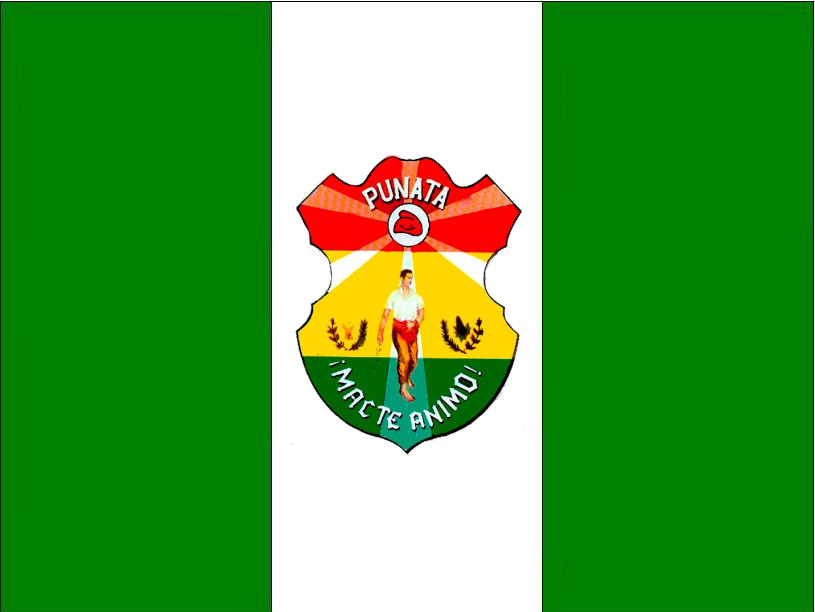
Punata

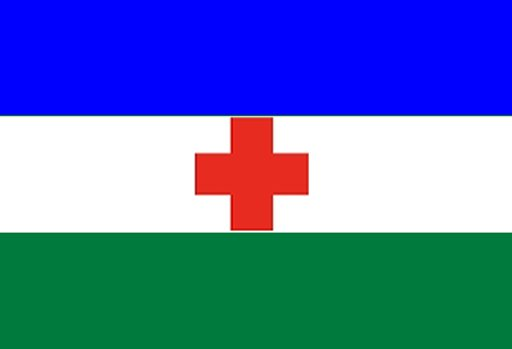
Roboré

Rurrenabaque

San Borja

San Ignacio de Velasco

San José de Chiquitos

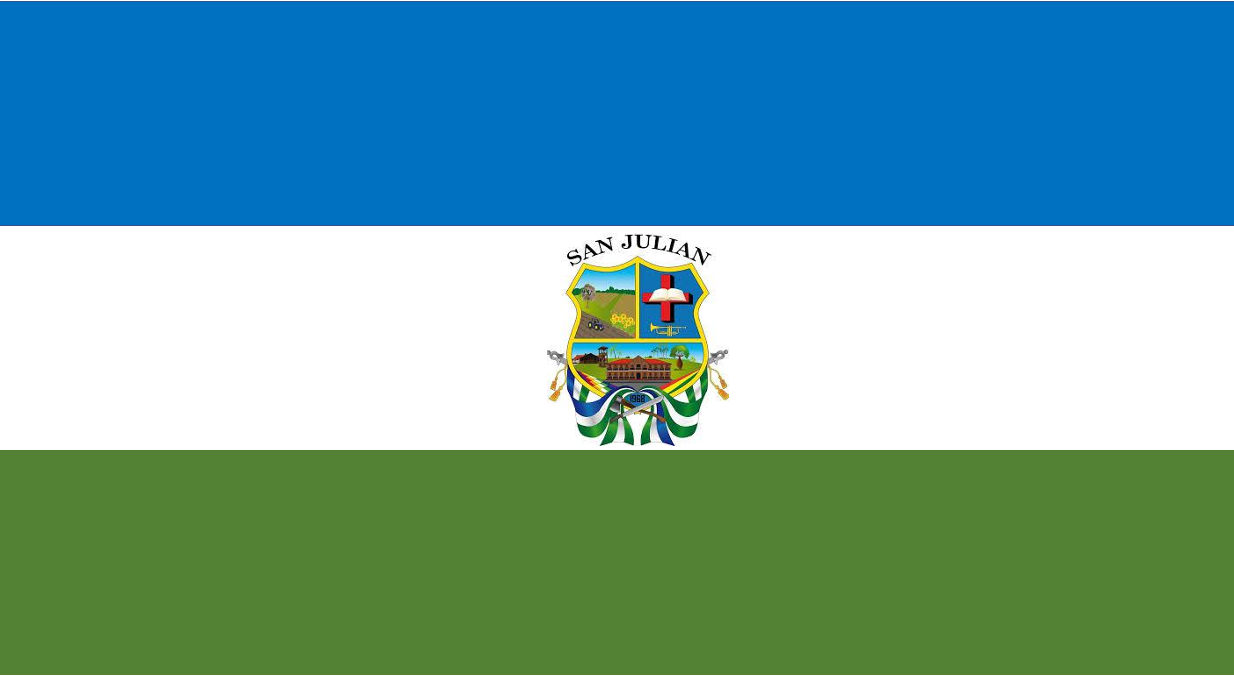
San Julián

San Lucas

Santa Cruz de la Sierra

Sucre (details)

Tarija

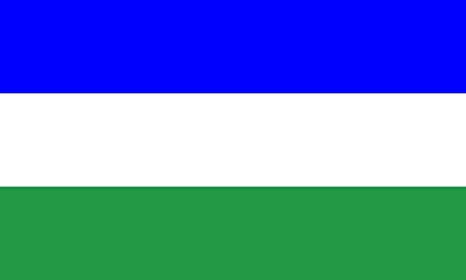
Tiquipaya

Tiwanaku

Trinidad

Tupiza

Uyuni

Vallegrande

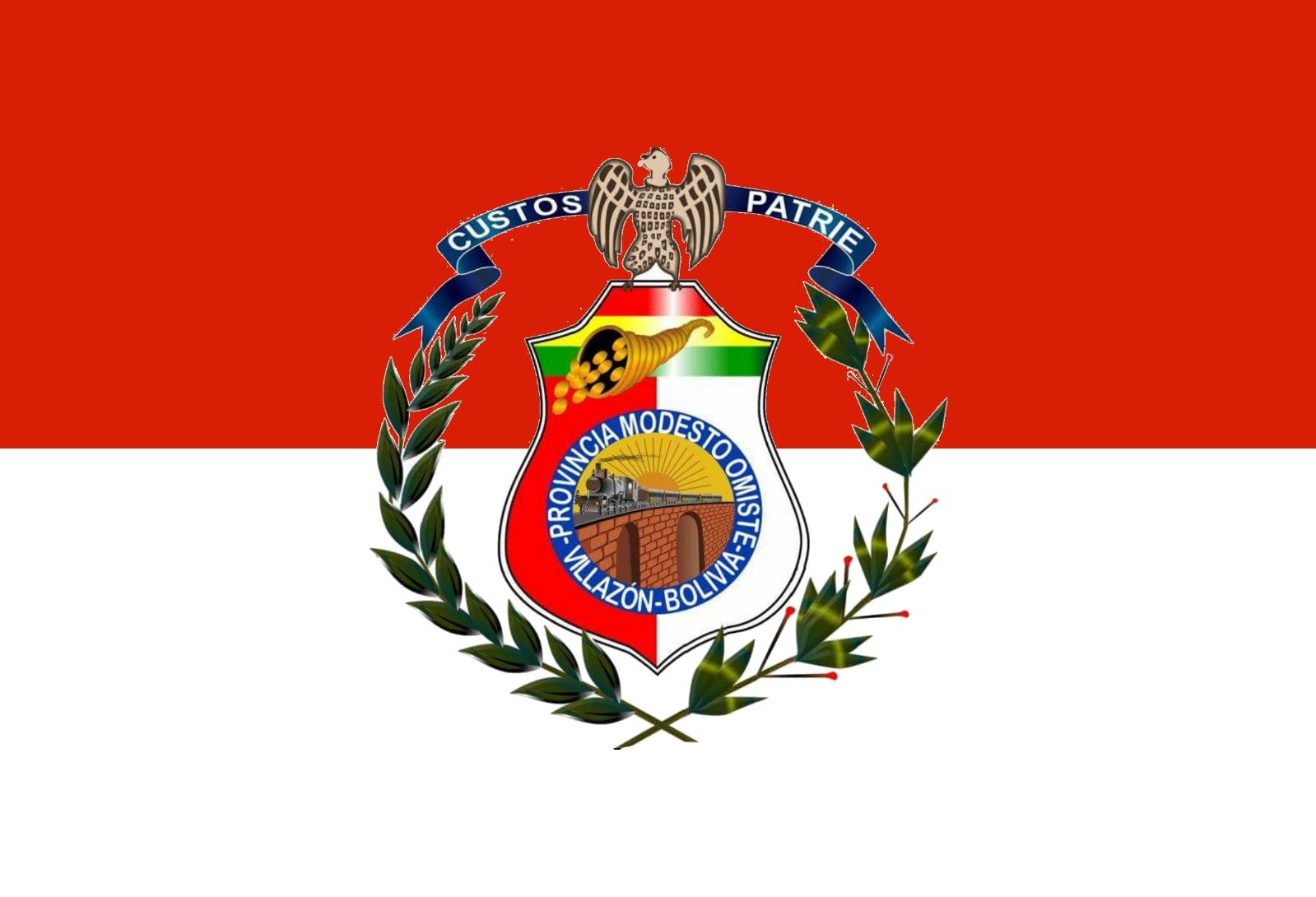
Villazón

Warnes

Yacuiba

=== Historical ===
La Plata de la Nueva Toledo

== Brazil ==
Abaetetuba

Abreu e Lima

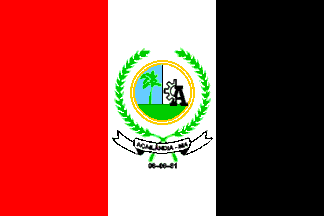
Açailândia

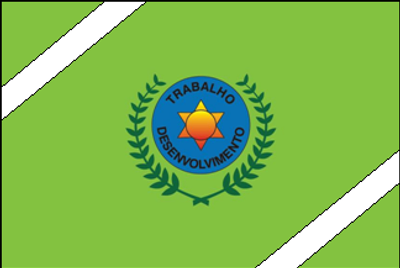
Acrelândia

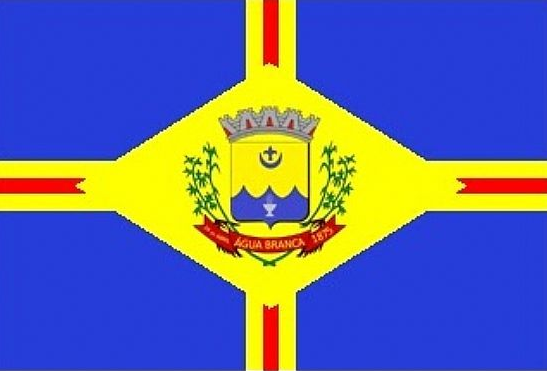
Água Branca

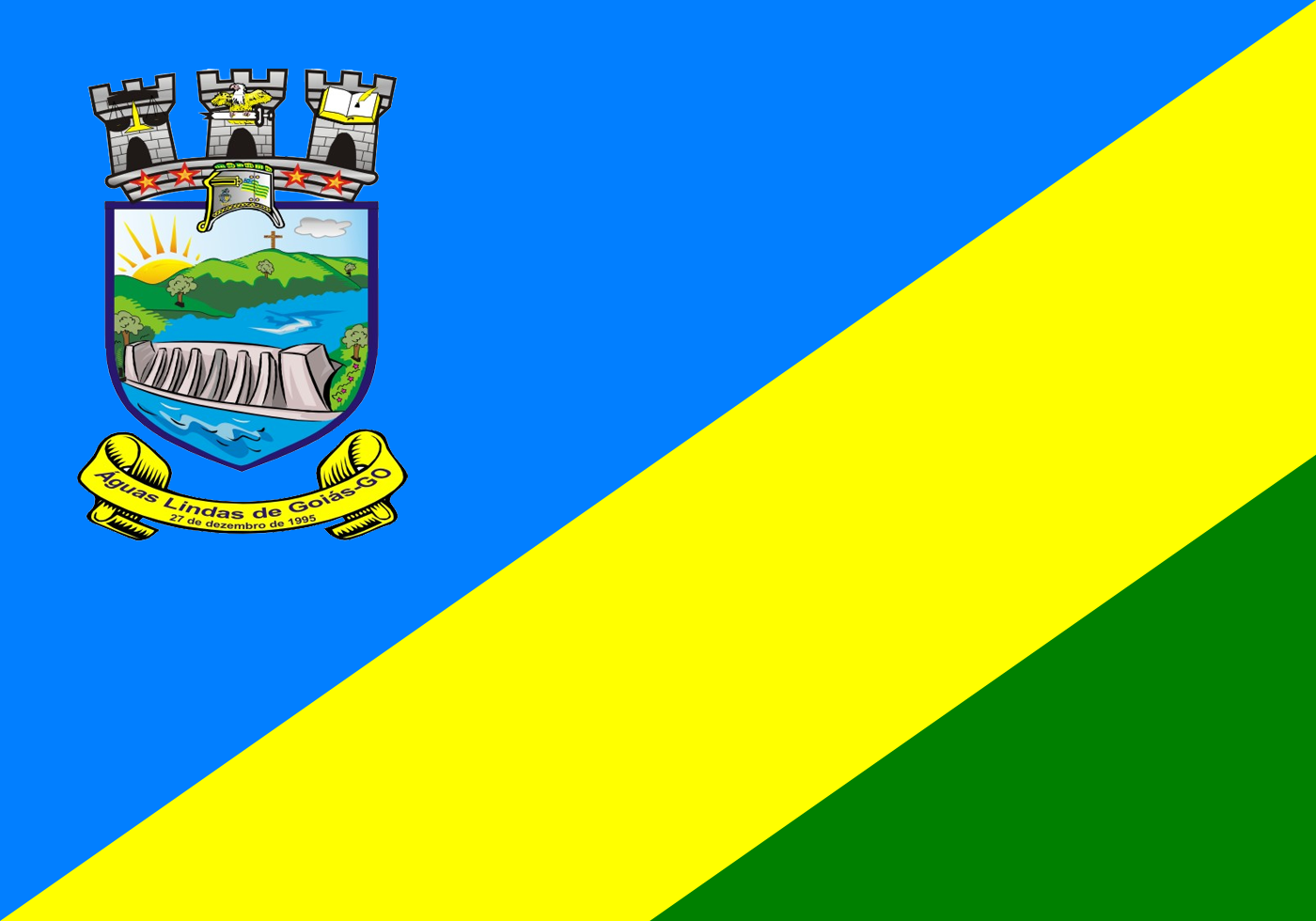
Águas Lindas de Goiás

Alagoinhas

Alegrete

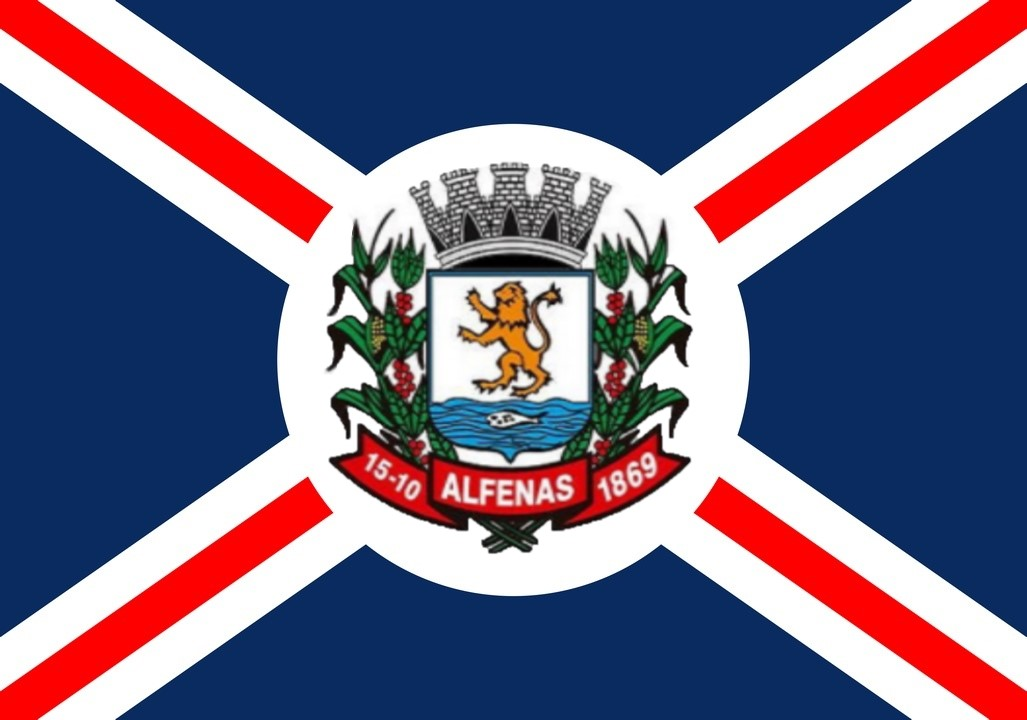
Alfenas

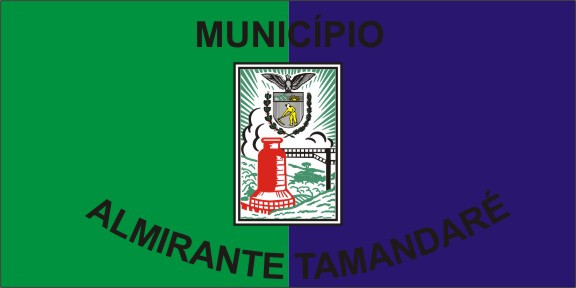
Almirante Tamandaré

Alta Floresta d'Oeste

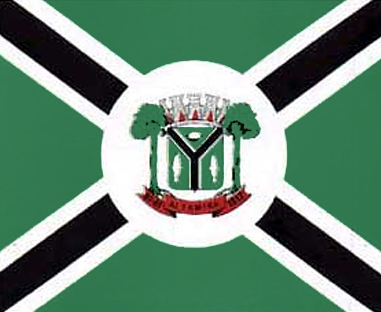
Altamira

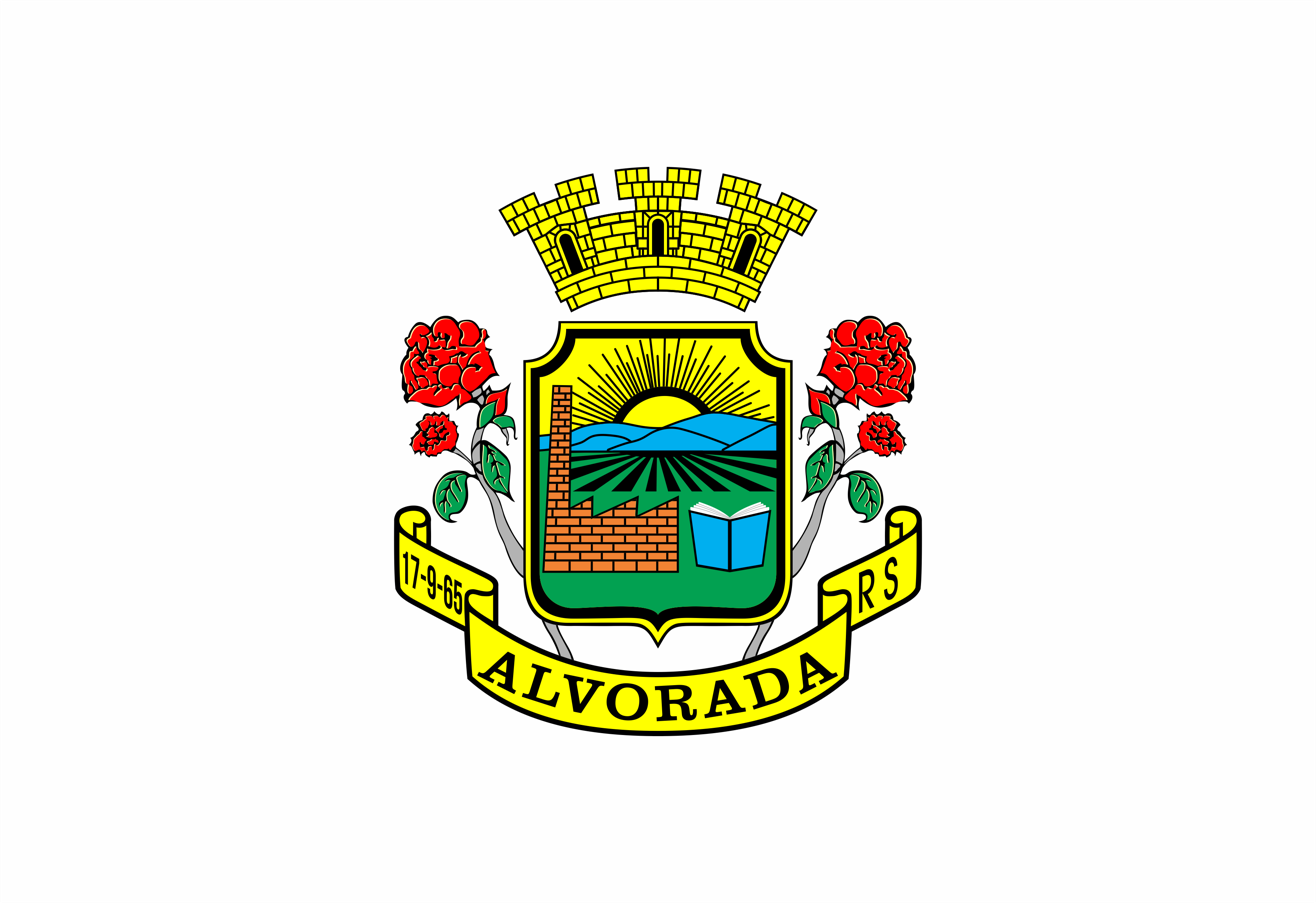
Alvorada

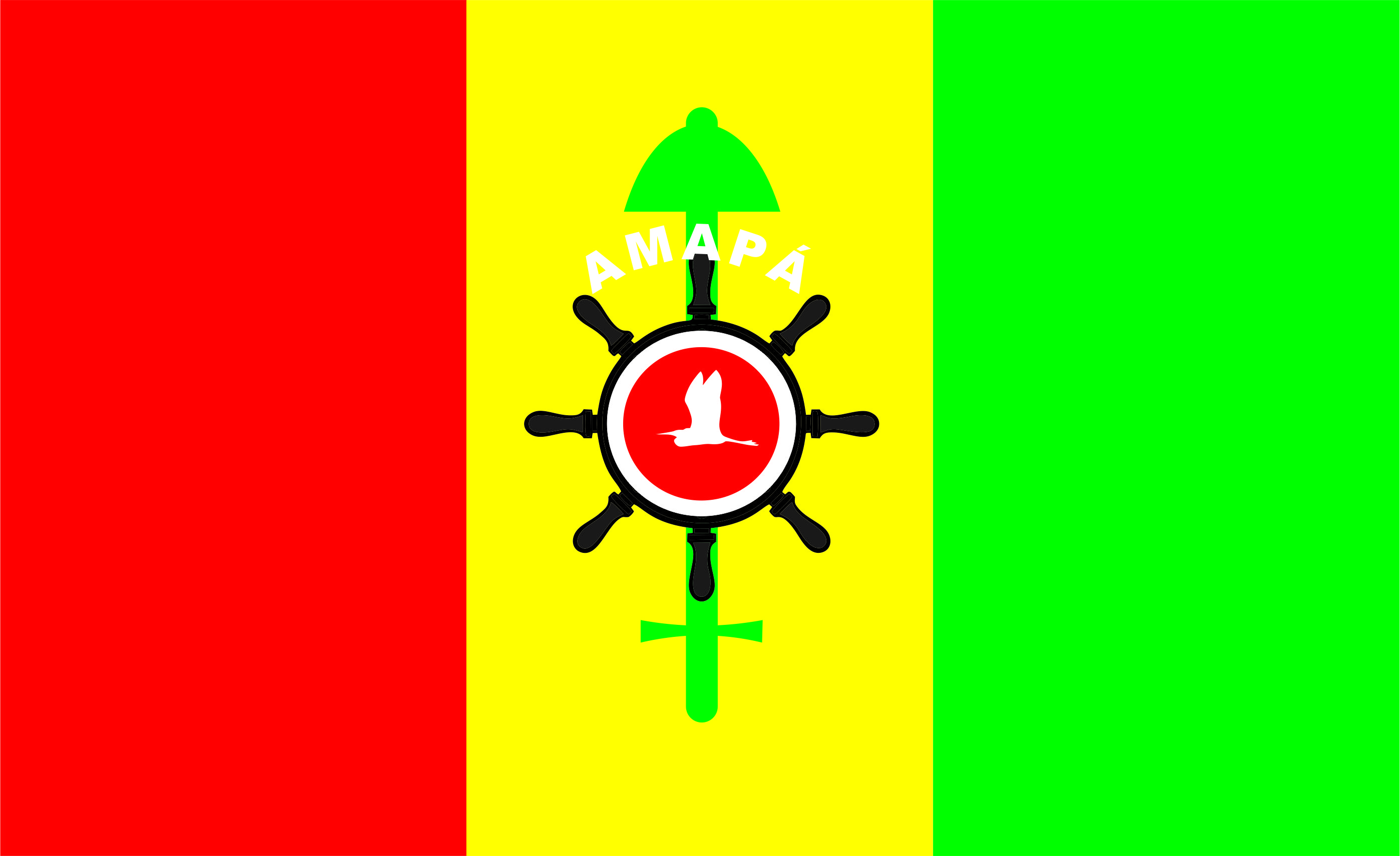
Amapá

Americana

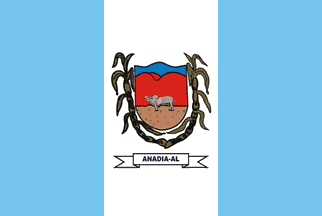
Anadia

Ananindeua

Anápolis

Andradina

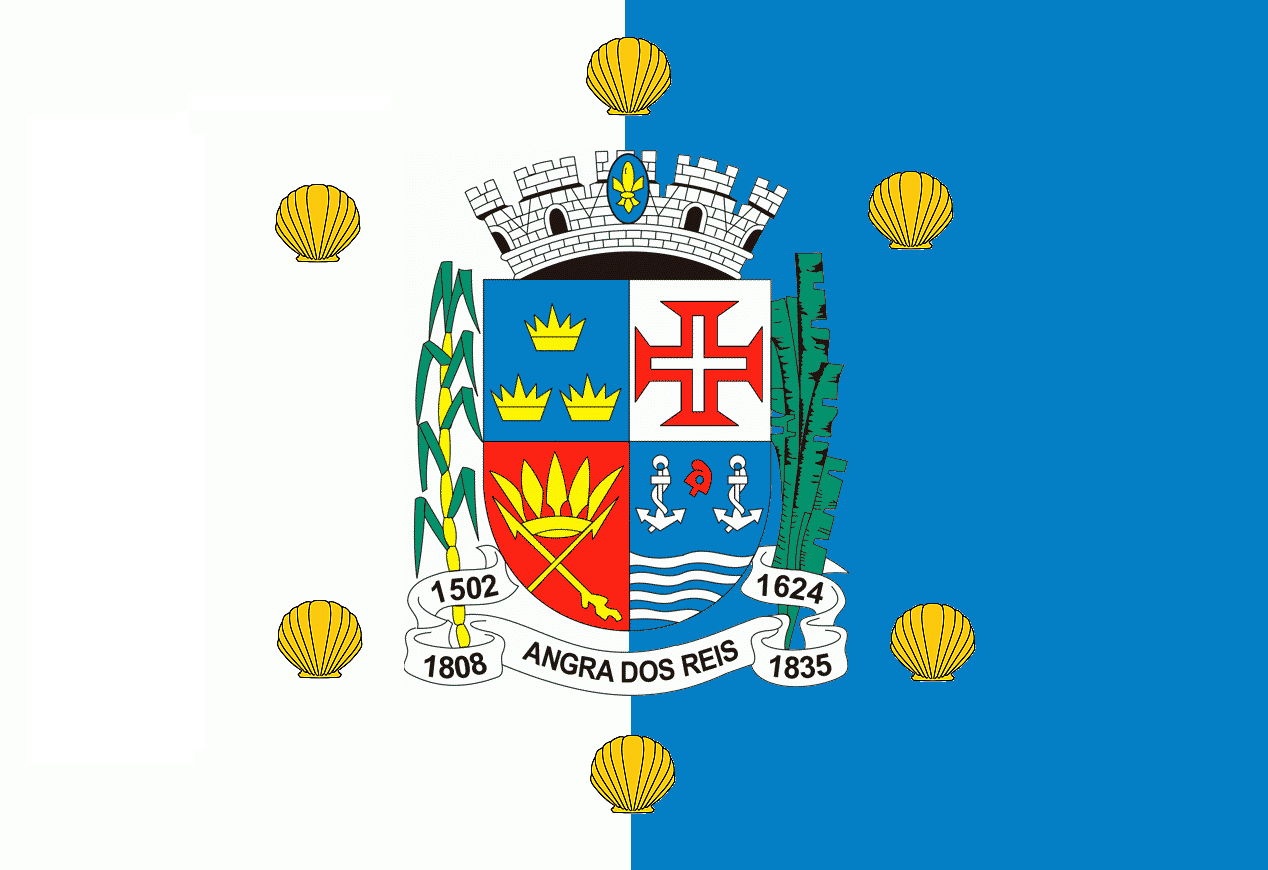
Angra dos Reis

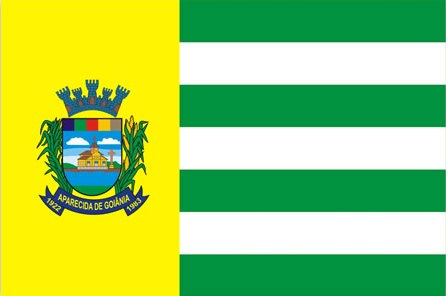
Aparecida de Goiânia

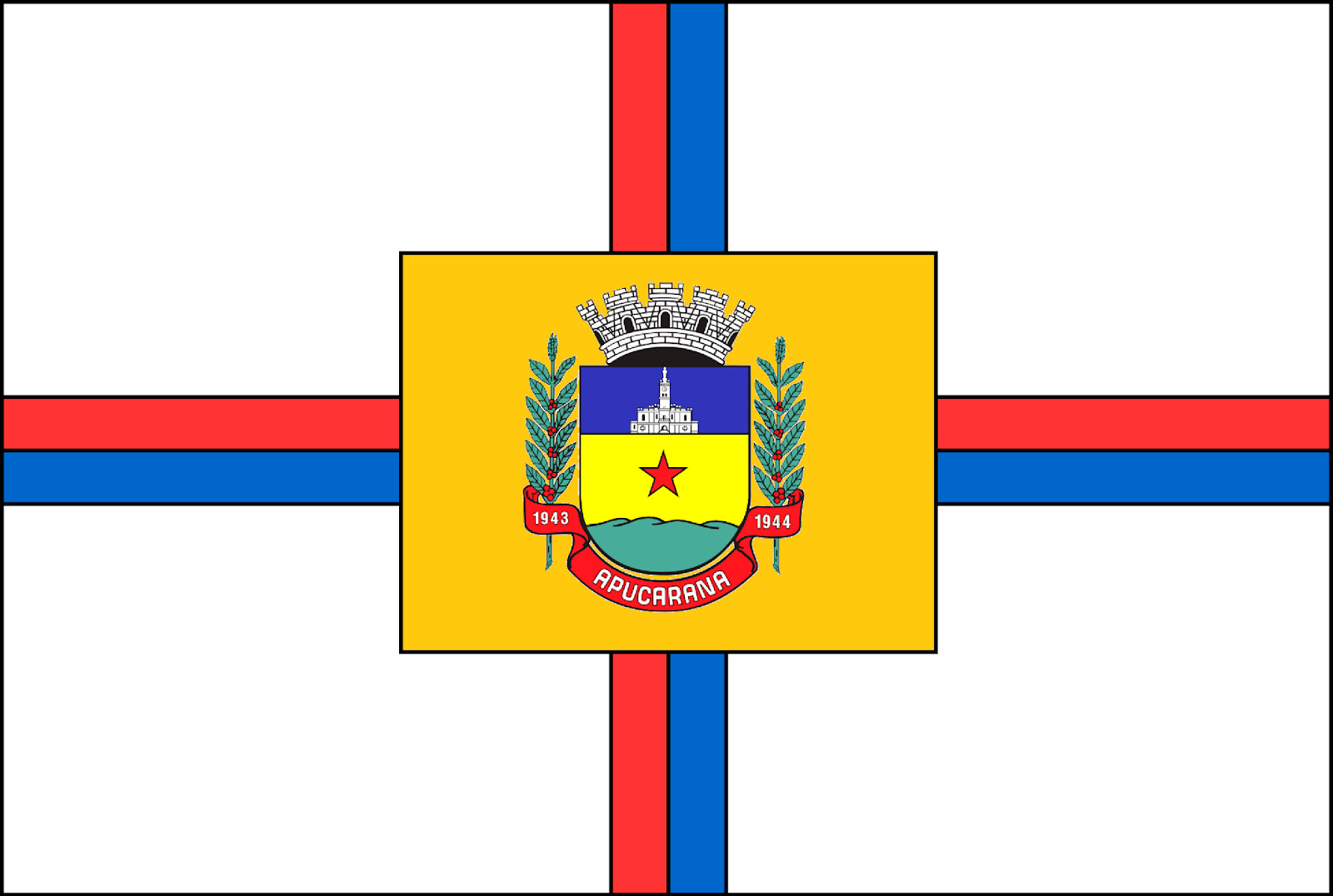
Apucarana

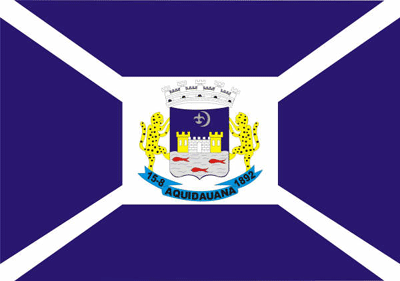
Aquidauana

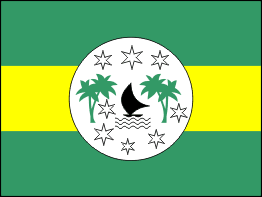
Aquiraz

Aracaju

Araçatuba

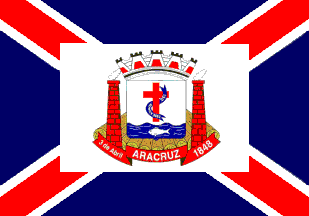
Aracruz

Araguaína

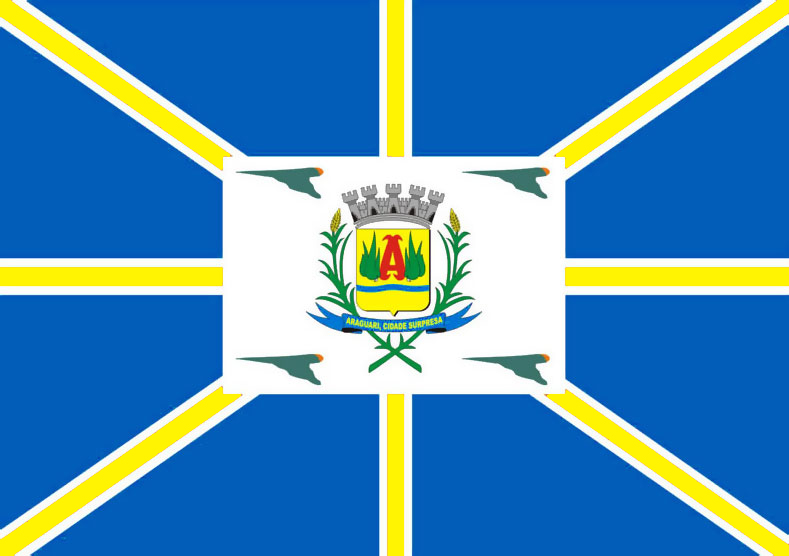
Araguari

Arapiraca

Arapongas

Araraquara

Araras

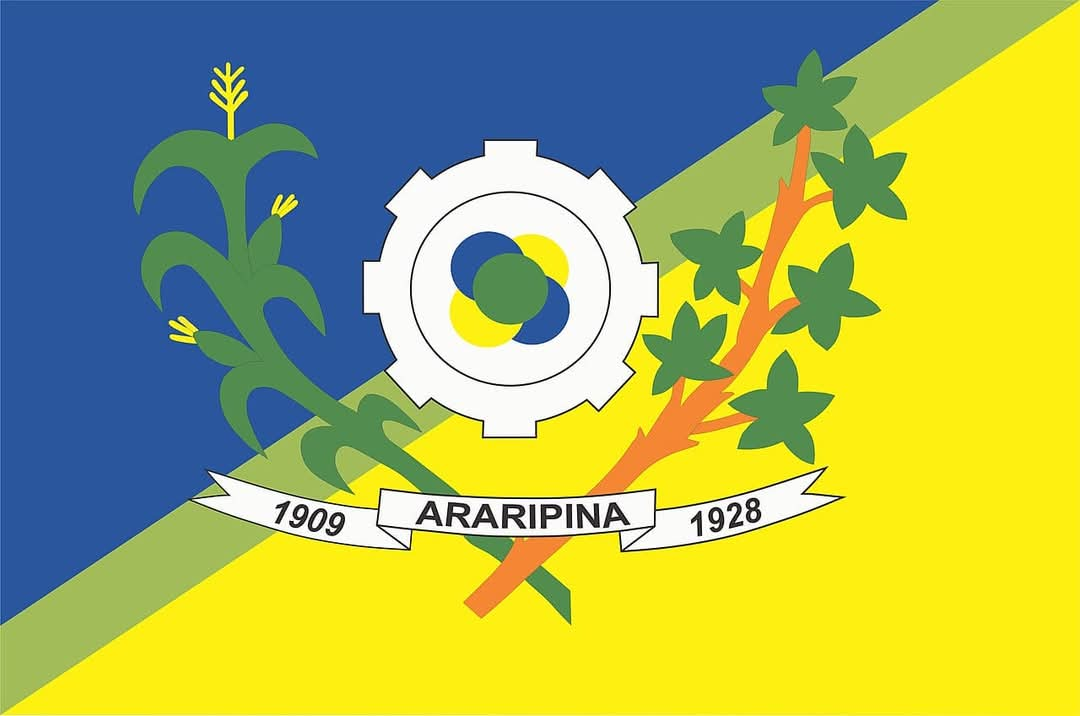
Araripina

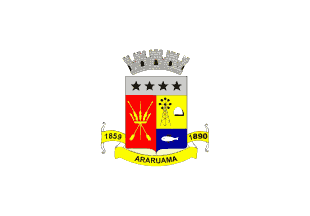
Araruama

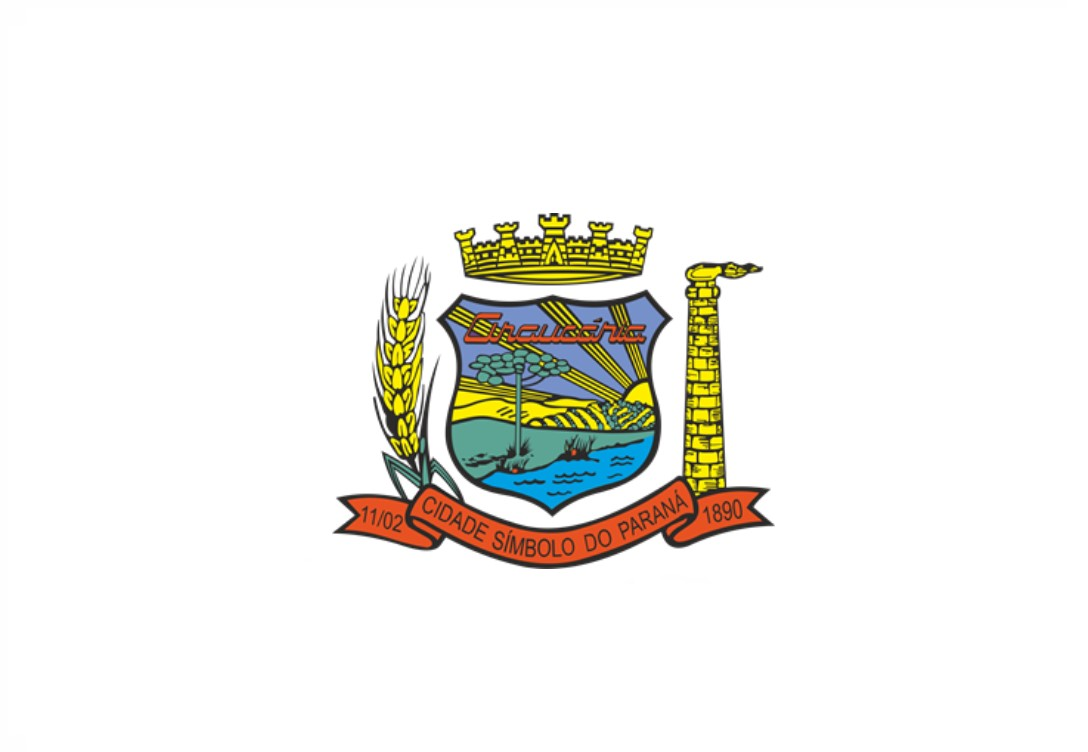
Araucária

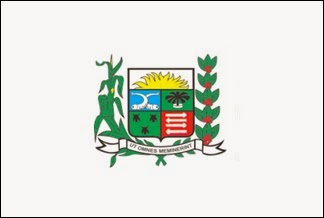
Araxá

Arcoverde

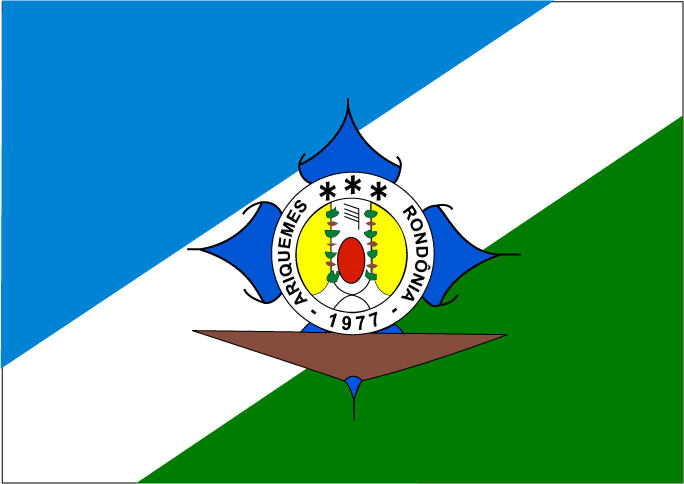
Ariquemes

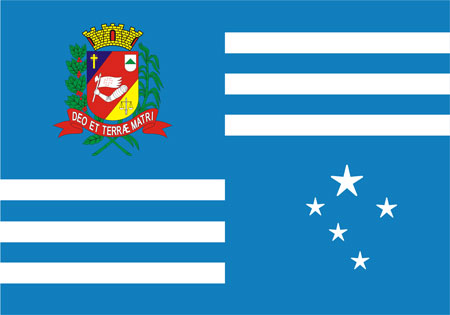
Assis

Assis Brasil

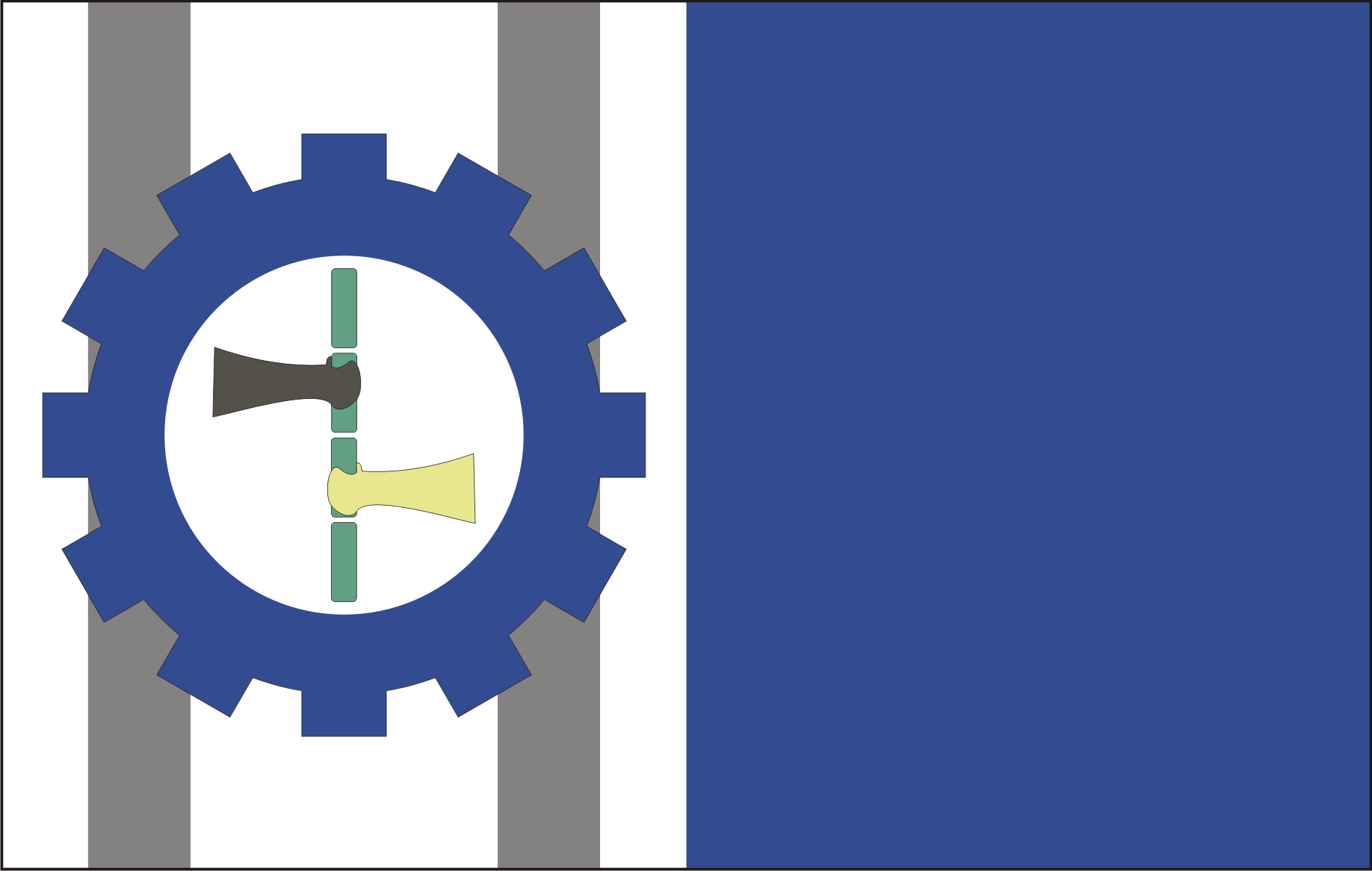
Atalaia

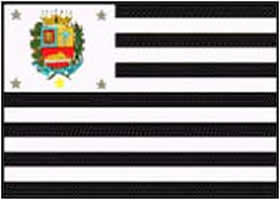
Atibaia

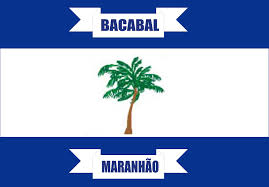
Bacabal

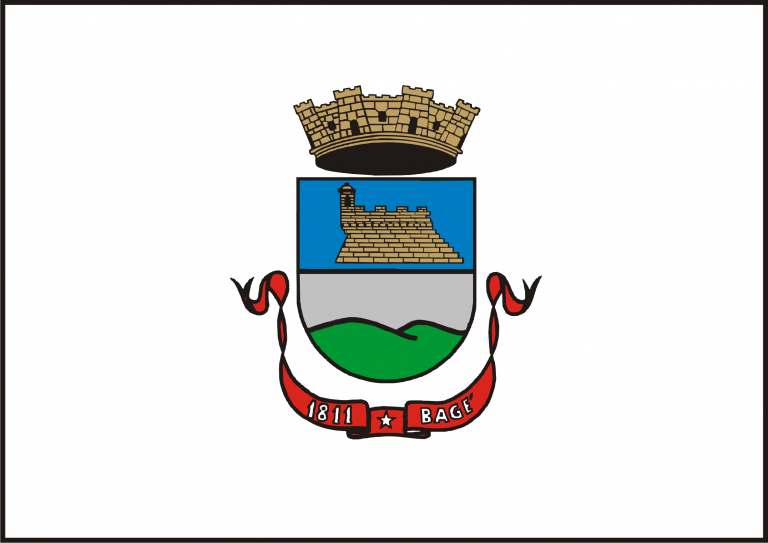
Bagé

Balneário Camboriú

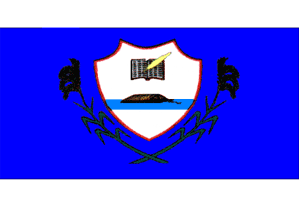
Balsas

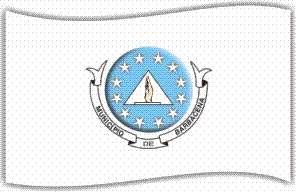
Barbacena

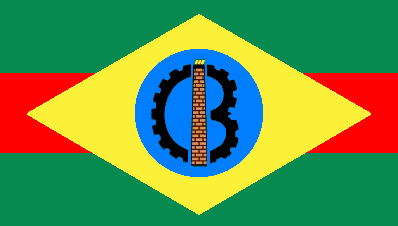
Barcarena

Barcelos

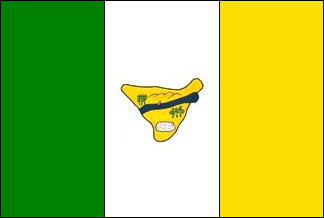
Barra de Santo Antônio

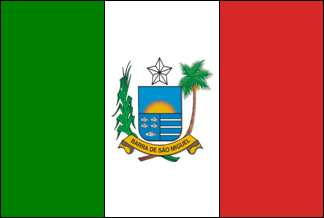
Barra de São Miguel

Barra do Corda

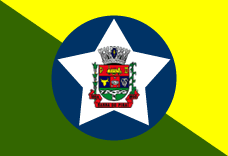
Barra do Piraí

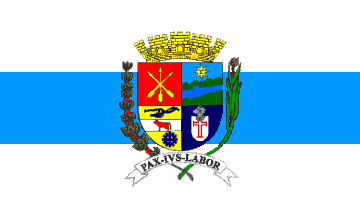
Barra Mansa

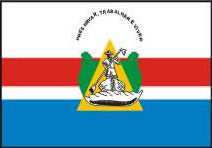
Barreiras

Barretos

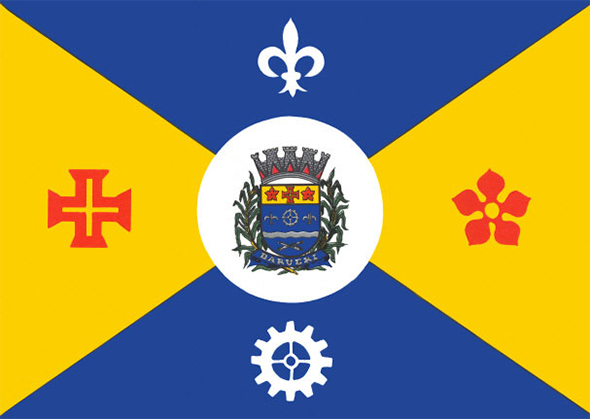
Barueri

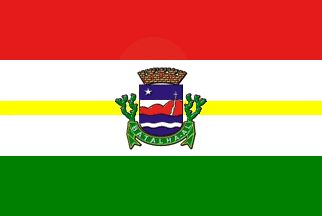
Batalha

Batatais

Bauru

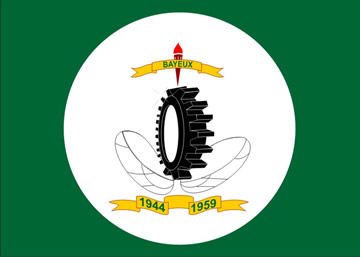
Bayeux

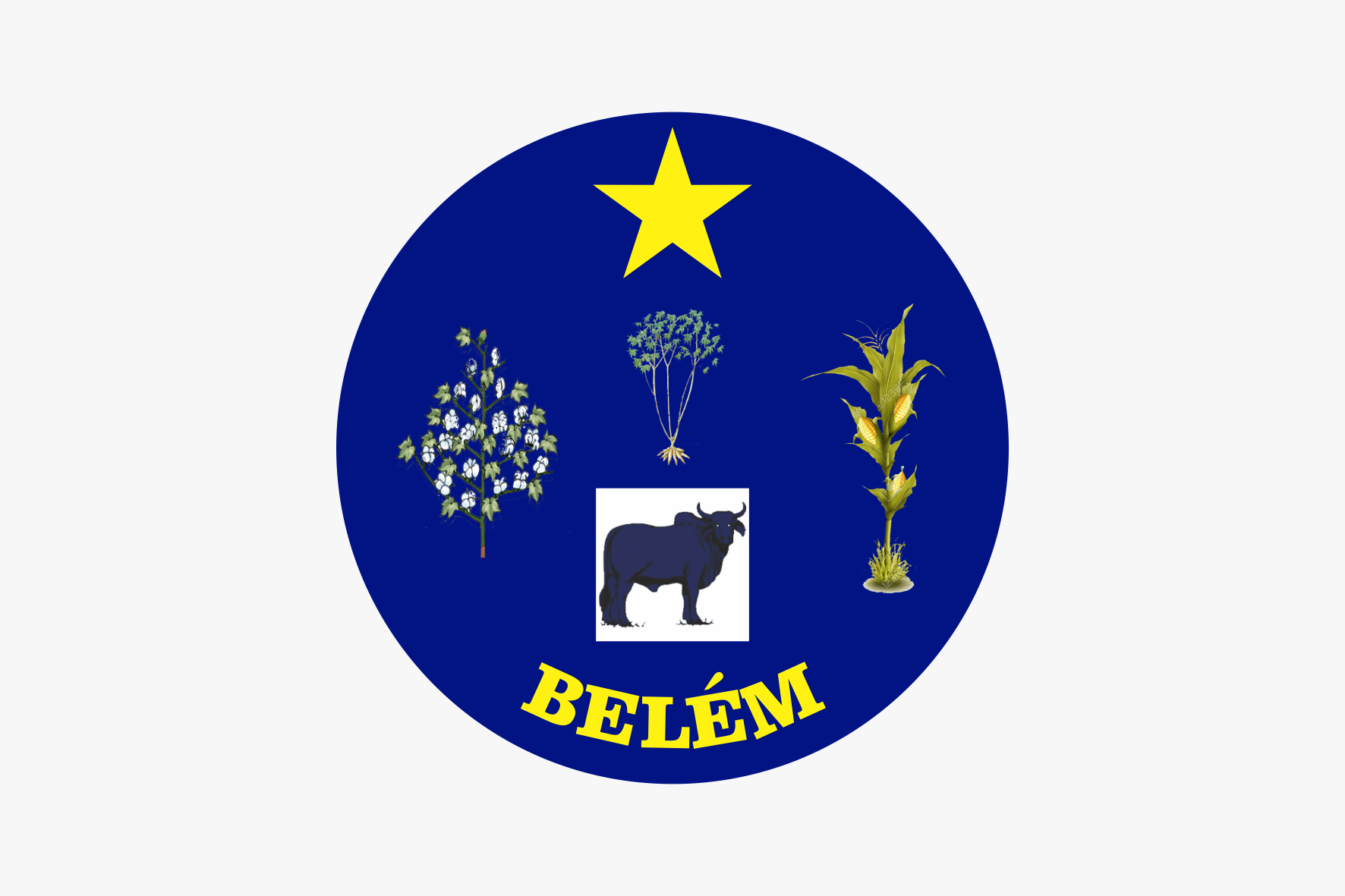
Belém, Alagoas

Belém, Pará

Belford Roxo

Belo Horizonte

Belo Jardim

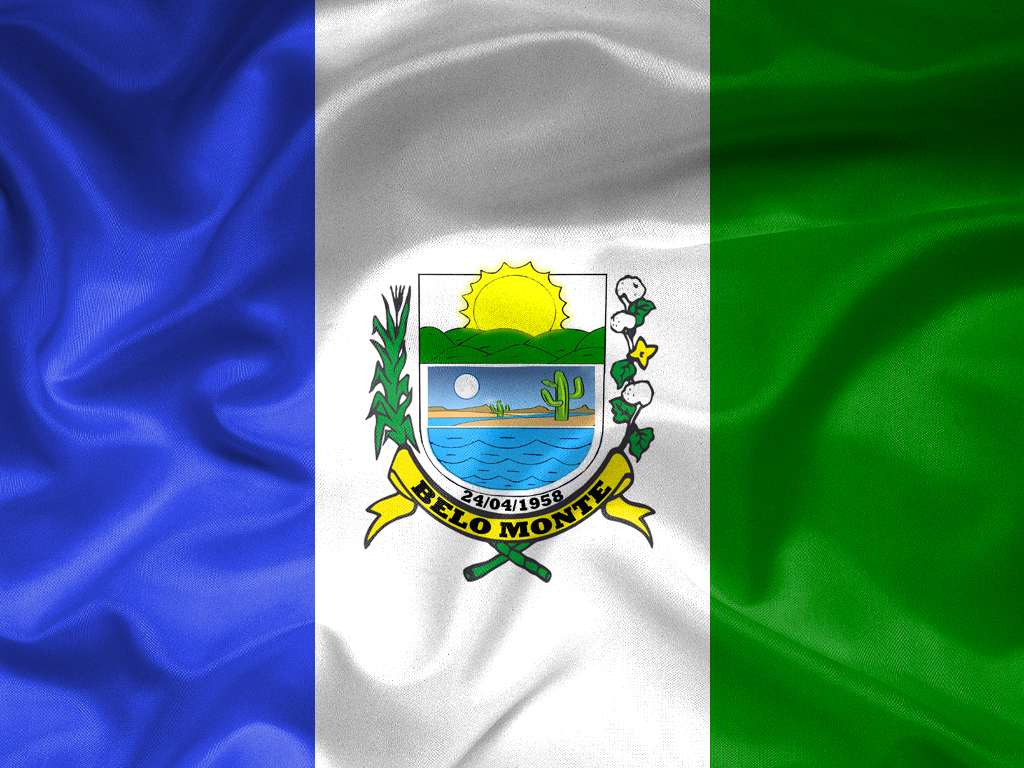
Belo Monte

Bento Gonçalves

Betim

Birigui

Blumenau

Boa Vista

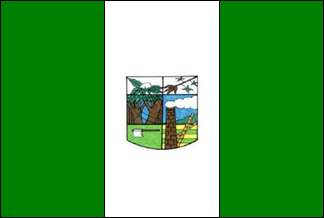
Boca da Mata

Bombinhas

Botucatu

Bragança

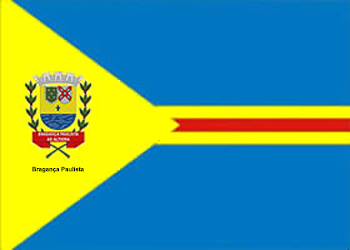
Bragança Paulista

Branquinha

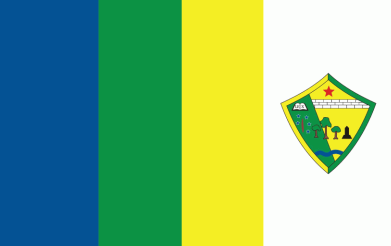
Brasiléia

Brasília (details)

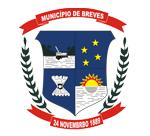
Breves

Brusque

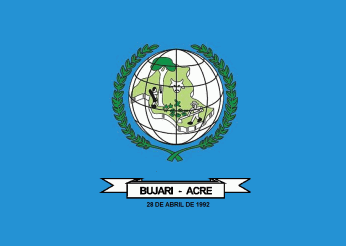
Bujari

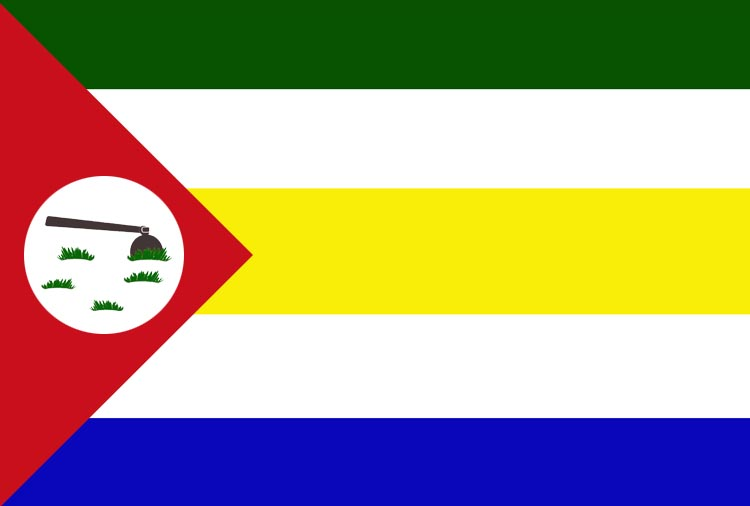
Buriticupu

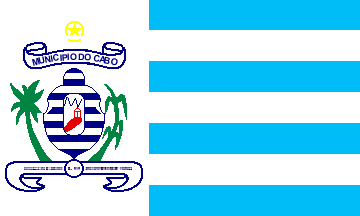
Cabo de Santo Agostinho

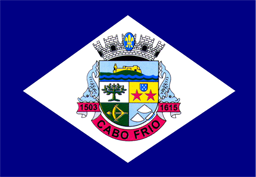
Cabo Frio

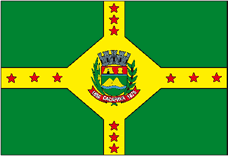
Caçapava

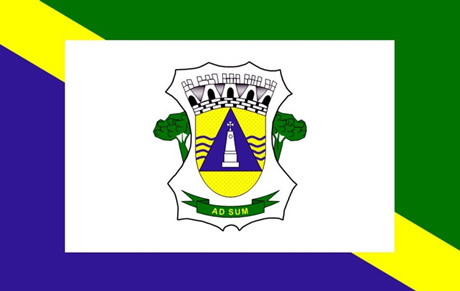
Cáceres

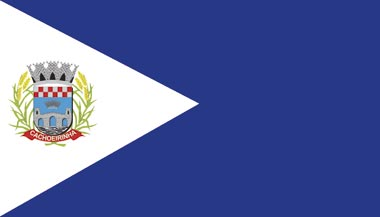
Cachoeirinha

Cachoeiro de Itapemirim

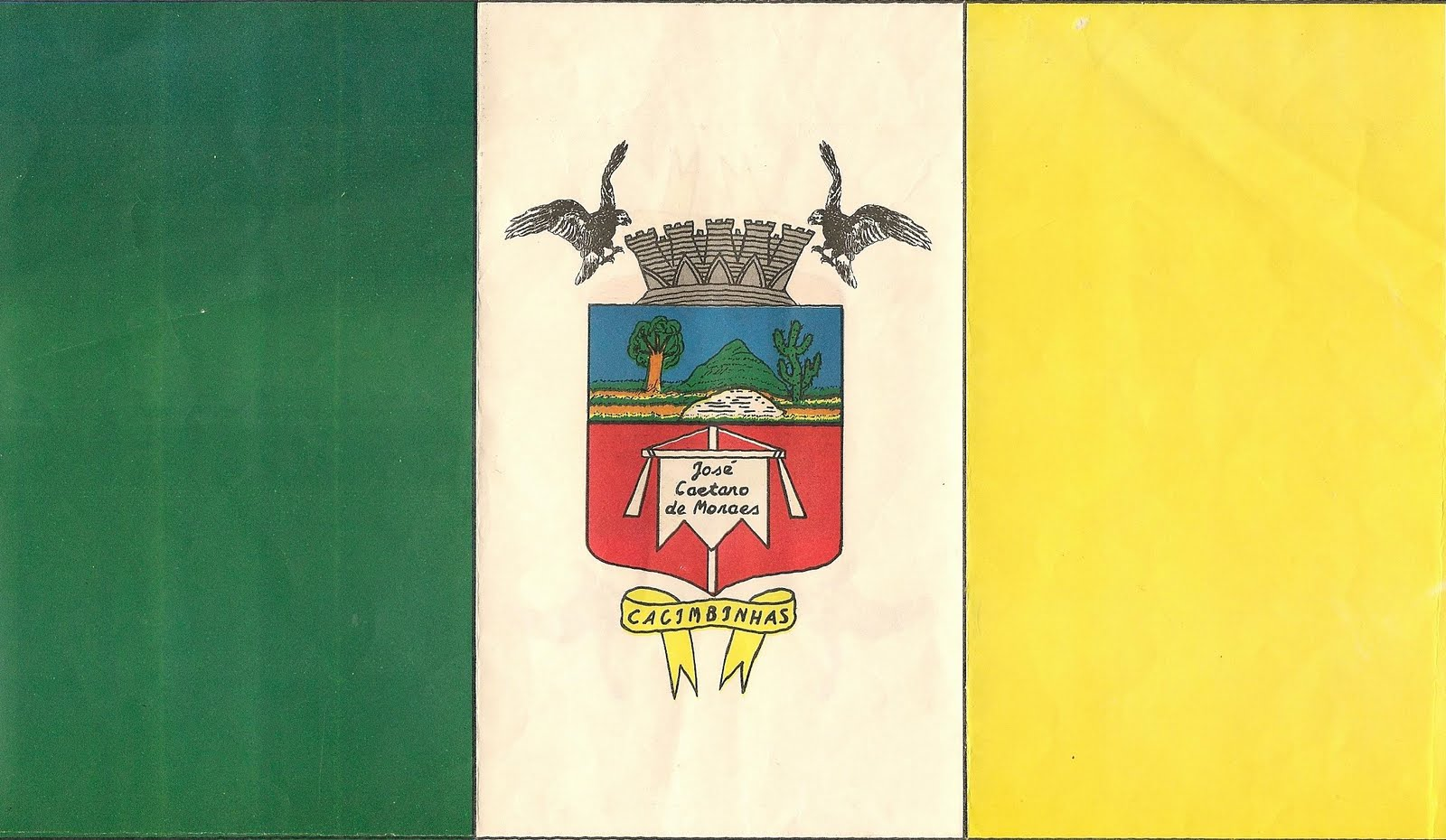
Cacimbinhas

Cacoal

Caieiras

Cajazeiras

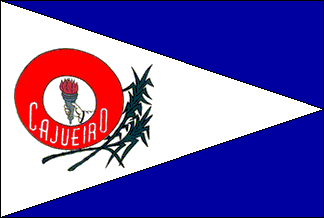
Cajueiro

Calçoene

Caldas Novas

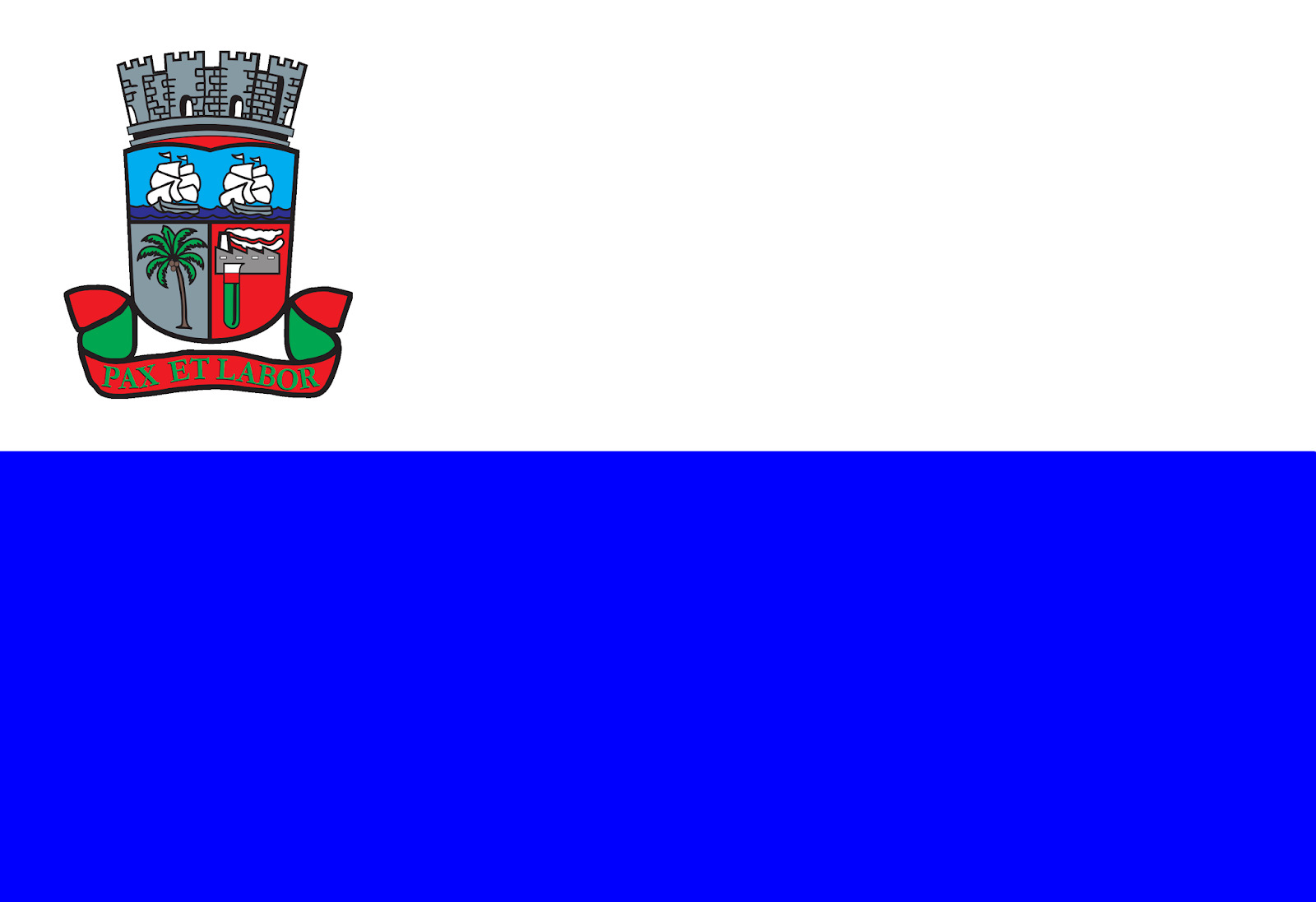
Camaçari

Camaquã

Camaragibe

Cambé

Camboriú

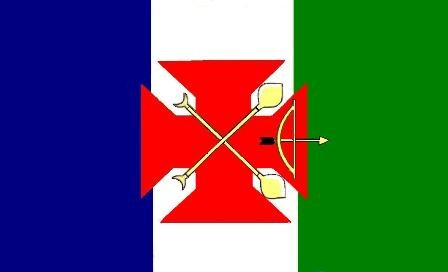
Cametá

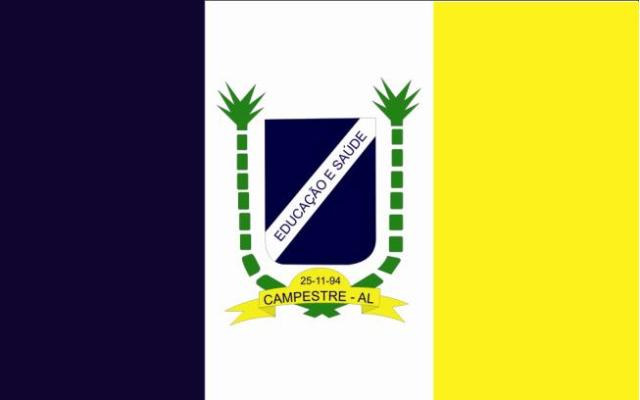
Campestre

Campina Grande

Campinas

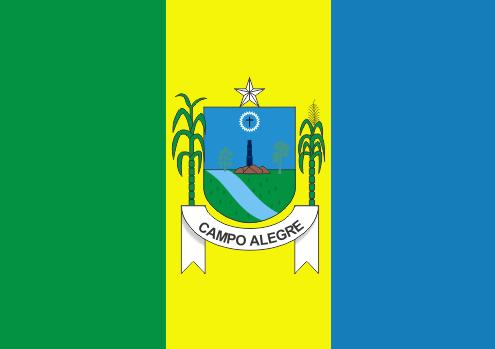
Campo Alegre

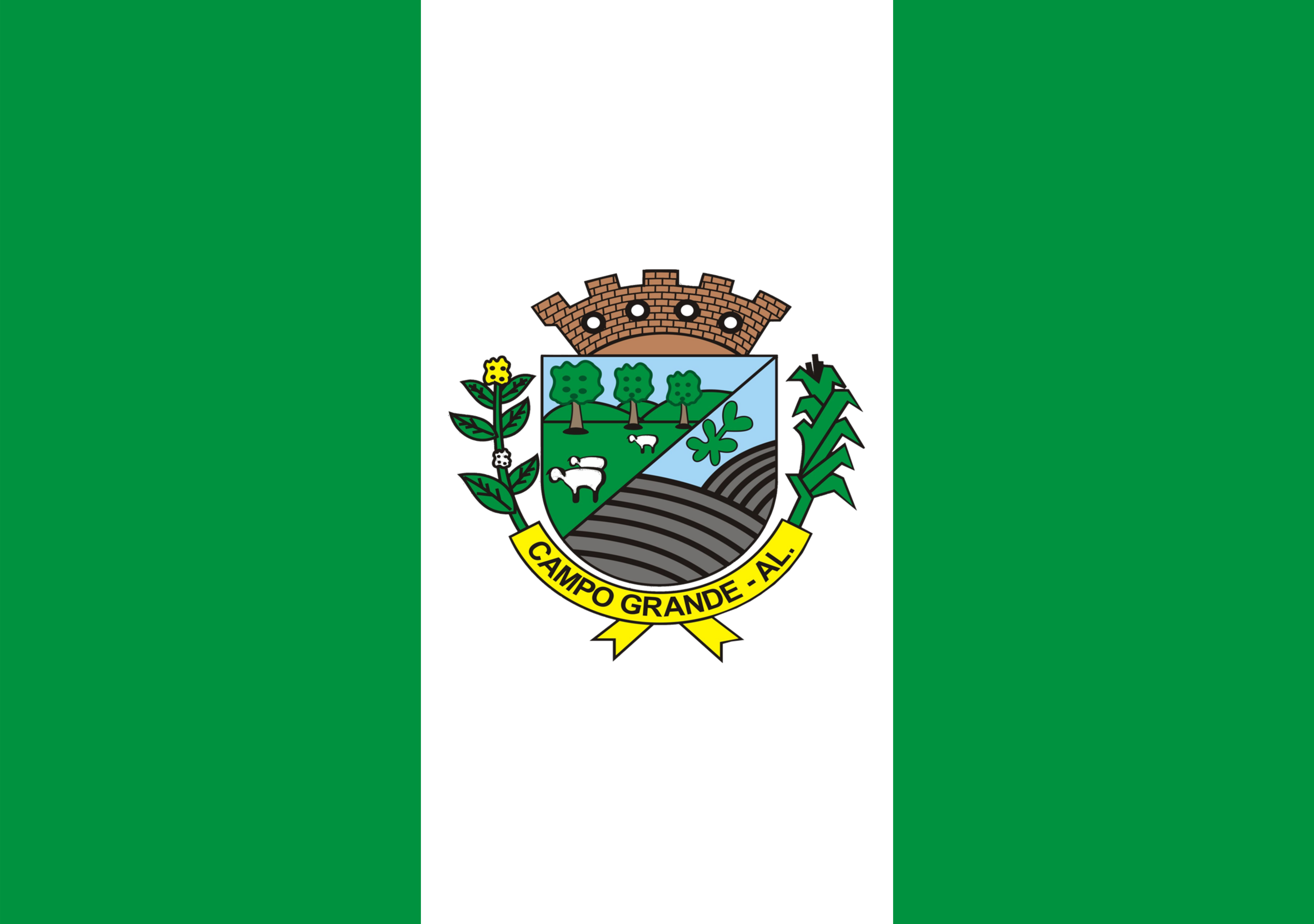
Campo Grande, Alagoas

Campo Grande, Mato Grosso do Sul

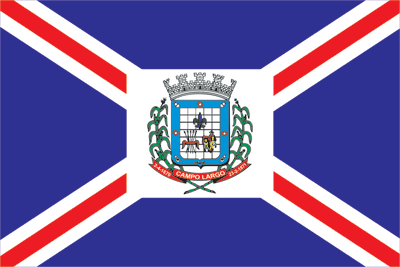
Campo Largo

Campo Mourão

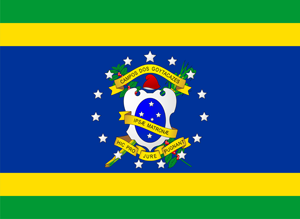
Campos dos Goytacazes

Canaã dos Carajás

Cananéia

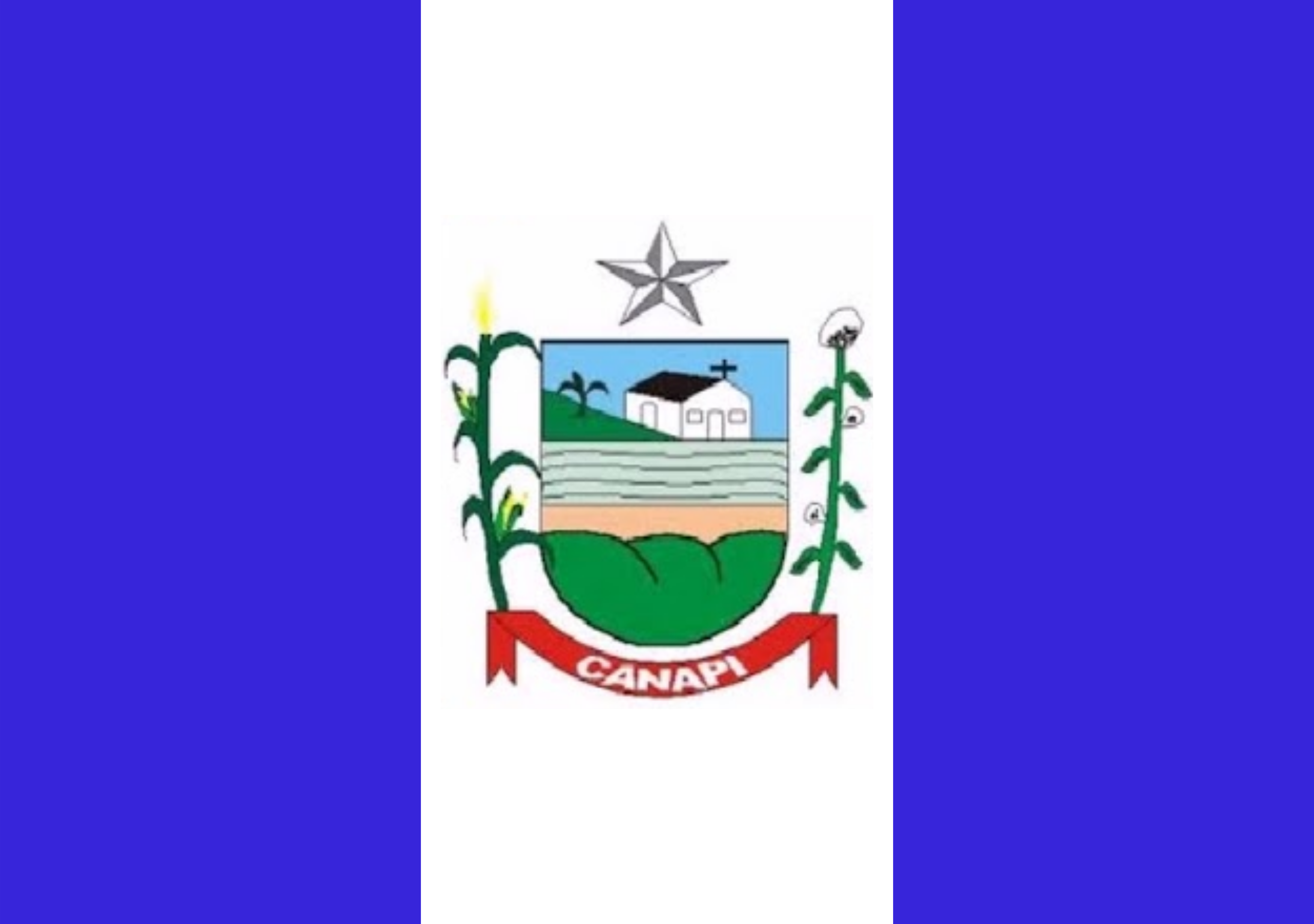
Canapi

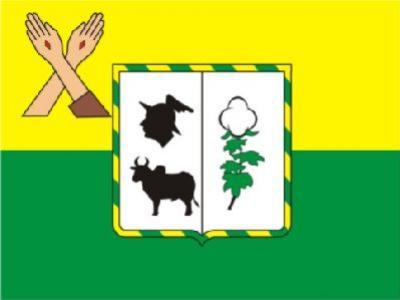
Canindé

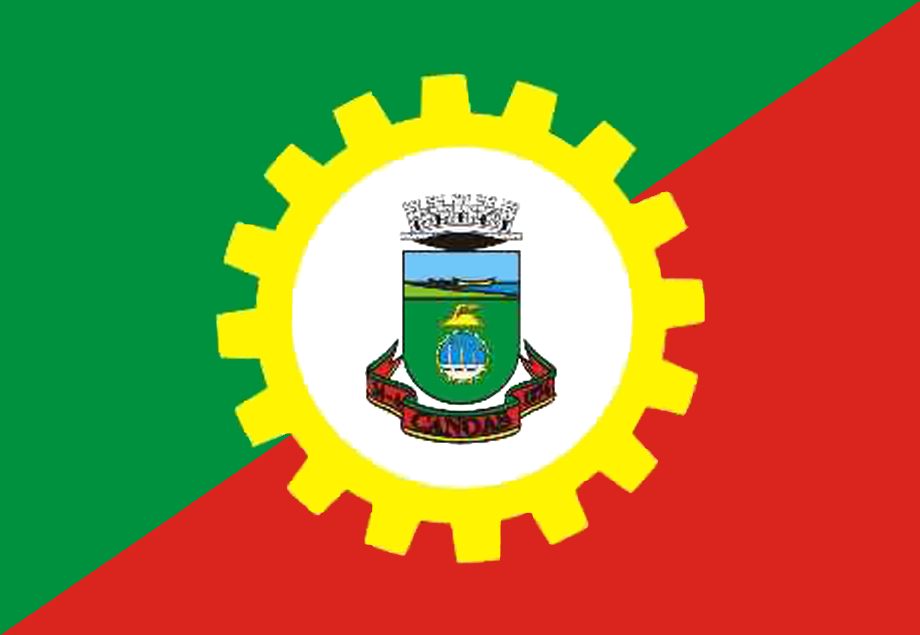
Canoas

Cantá

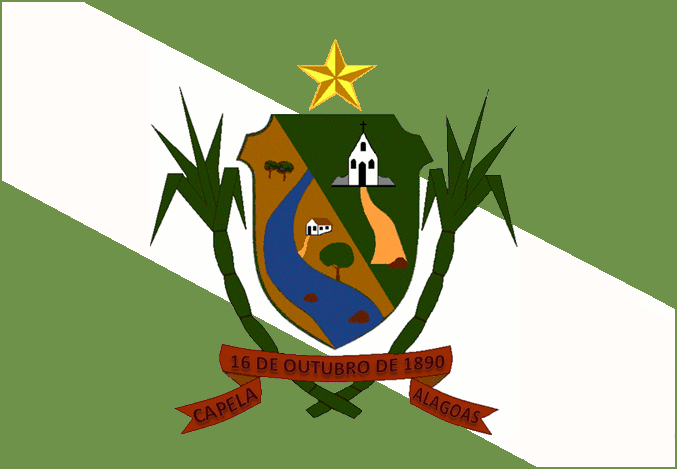
Capela

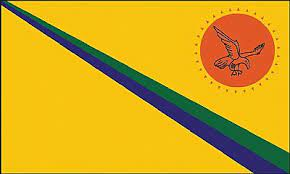
Capixaba

Caraguatatuba

Carapicuíba

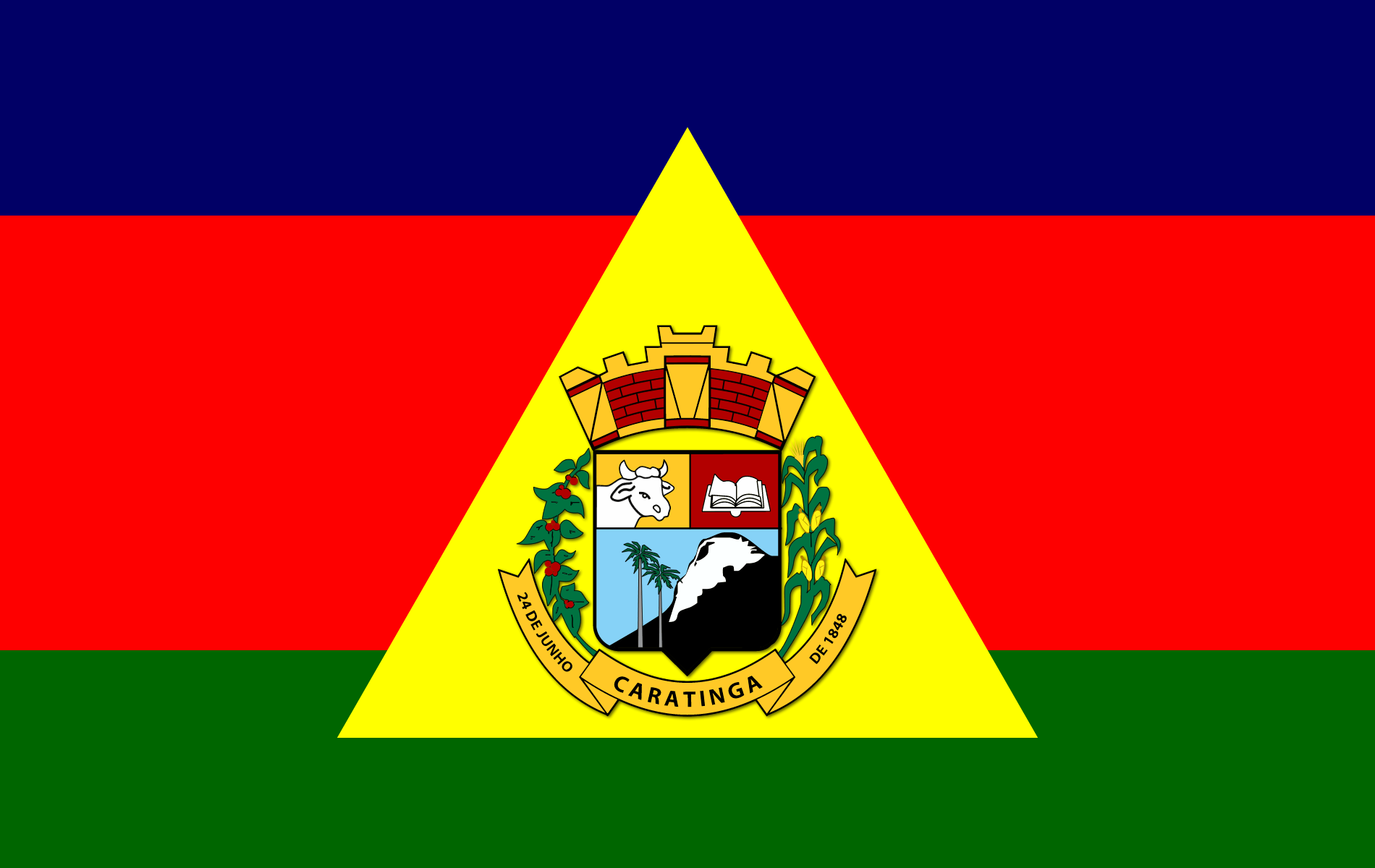
Caratinga

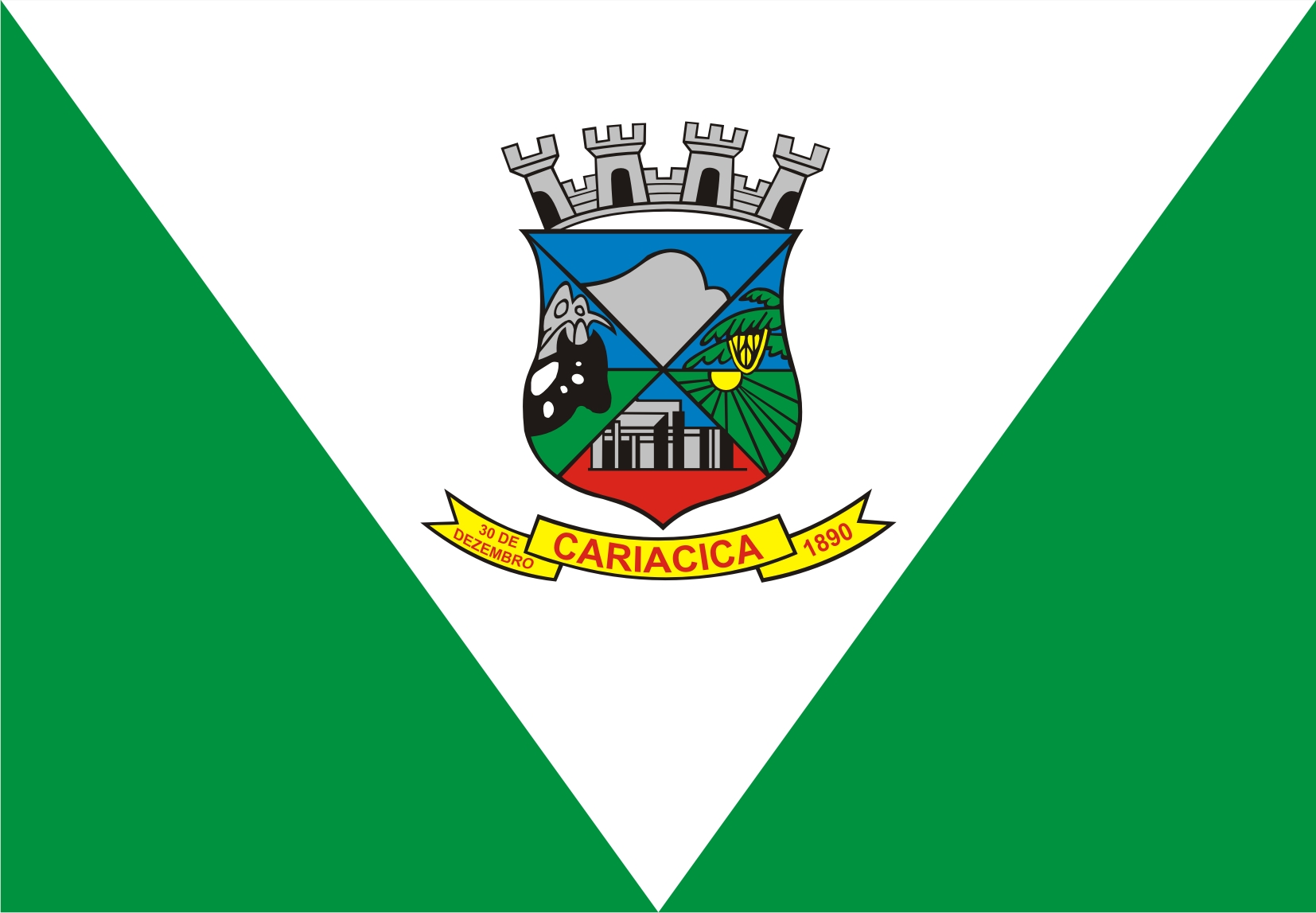
Cariacica

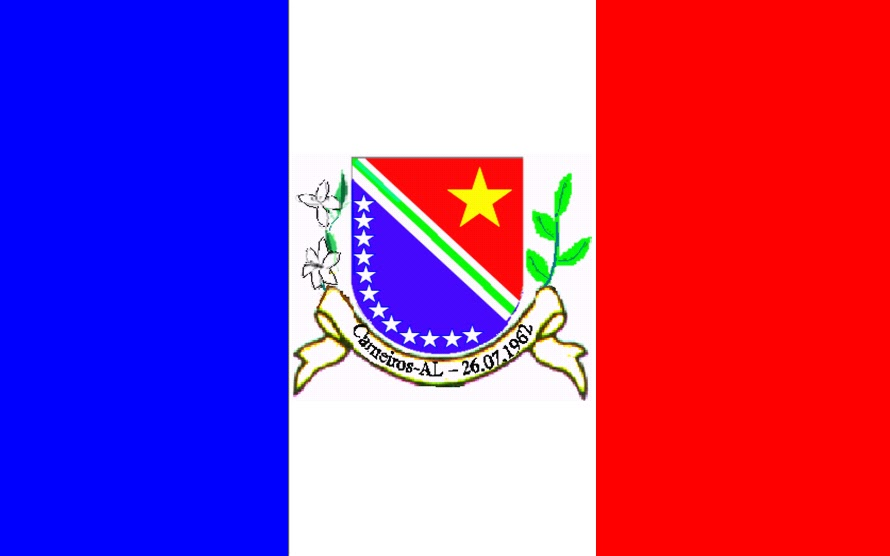
Carneiros

Carolina

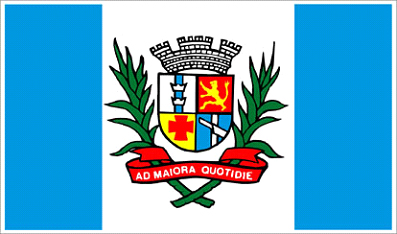
Carpina

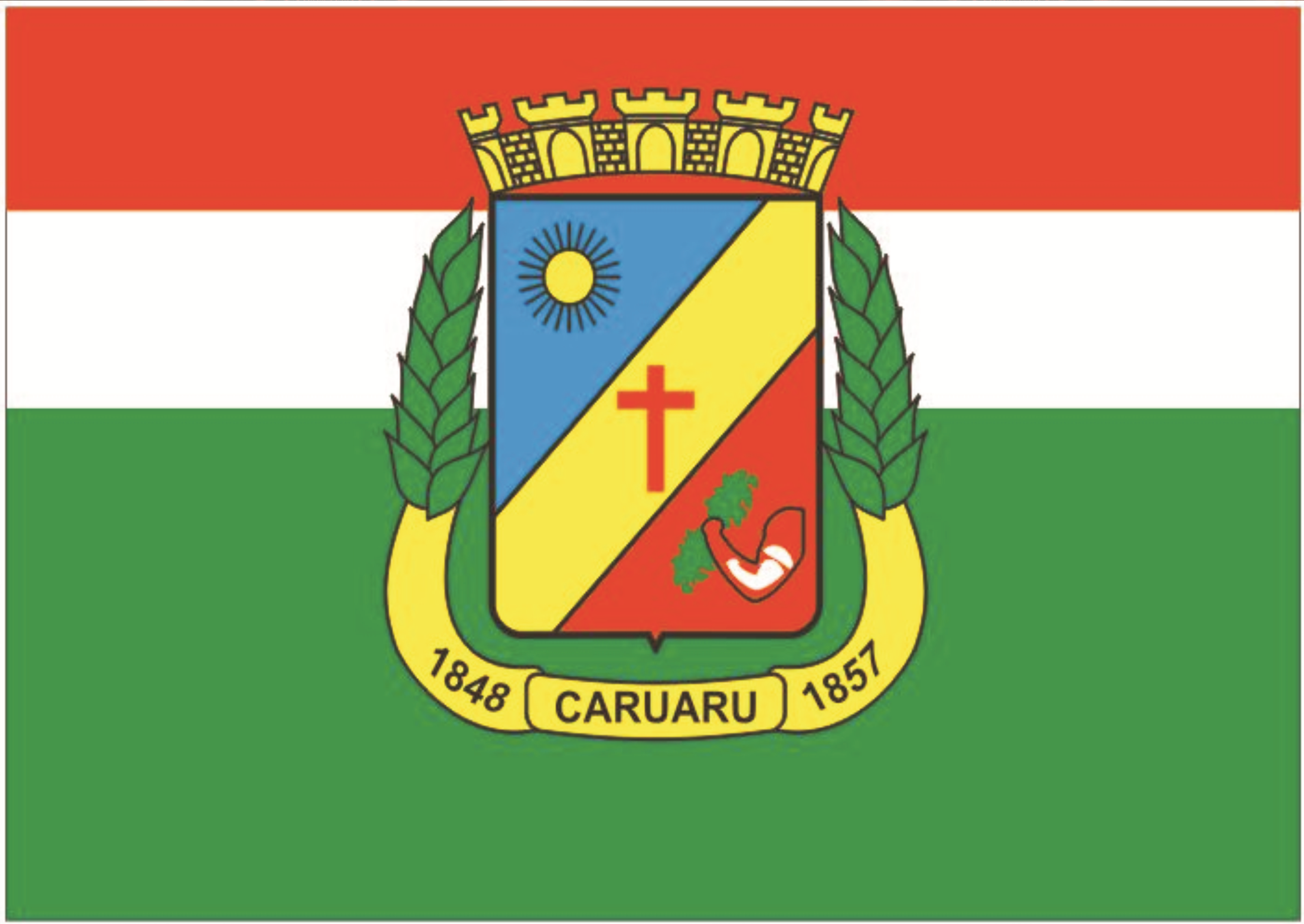
Caruaru

Carutapera

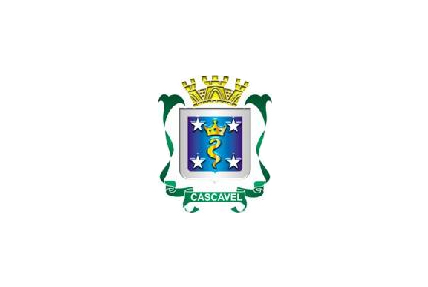
Cascavel

Castanhal

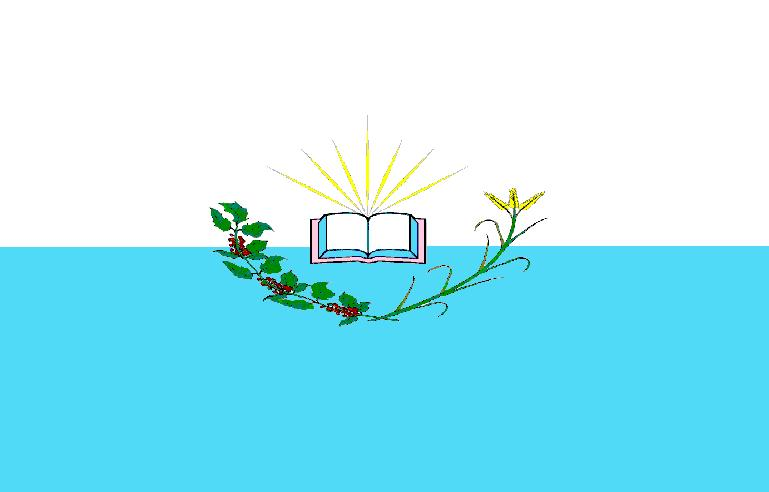
Catalão

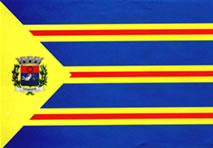
Catanduva

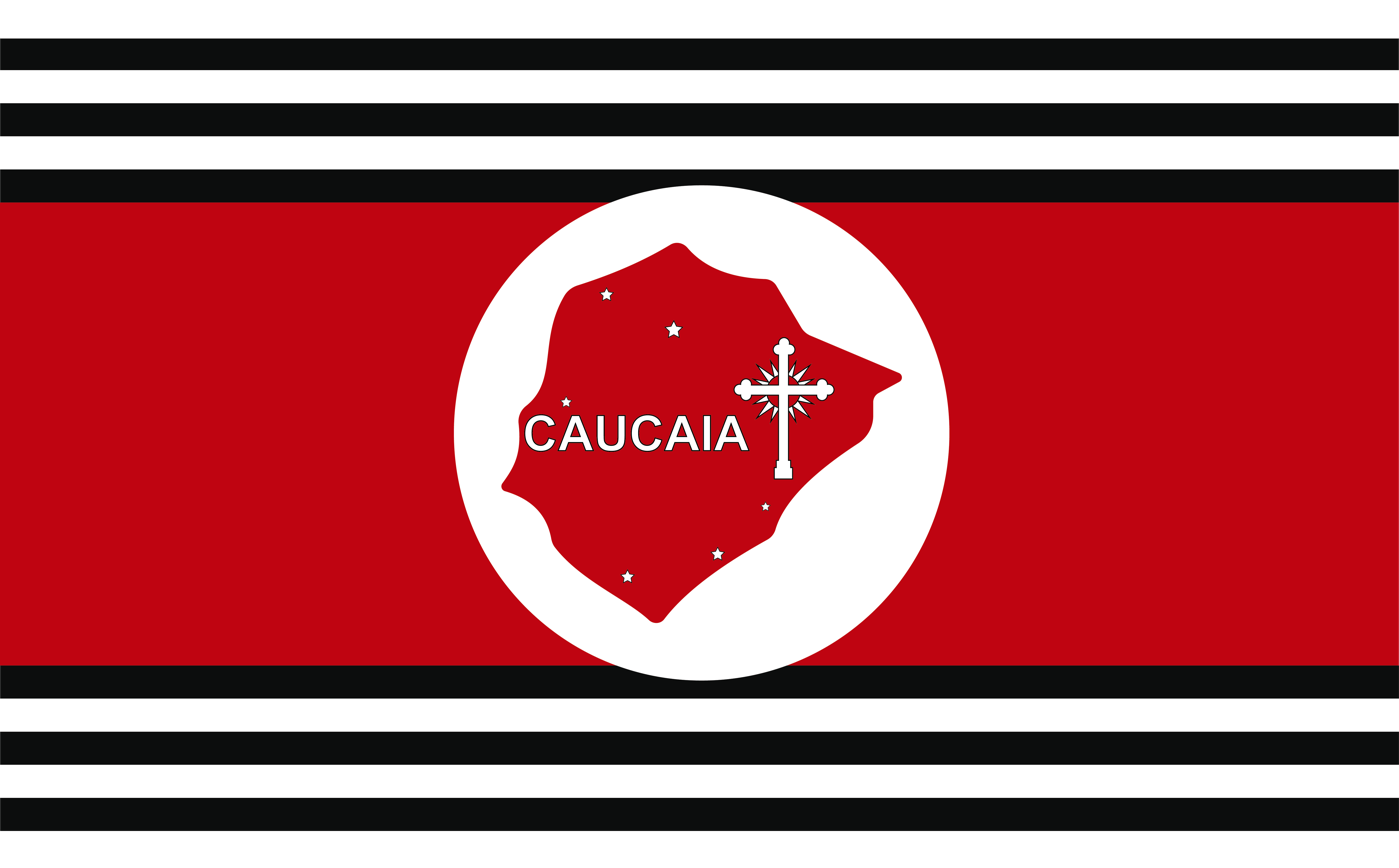
Caucaia

Caxias

Caxias do Sul

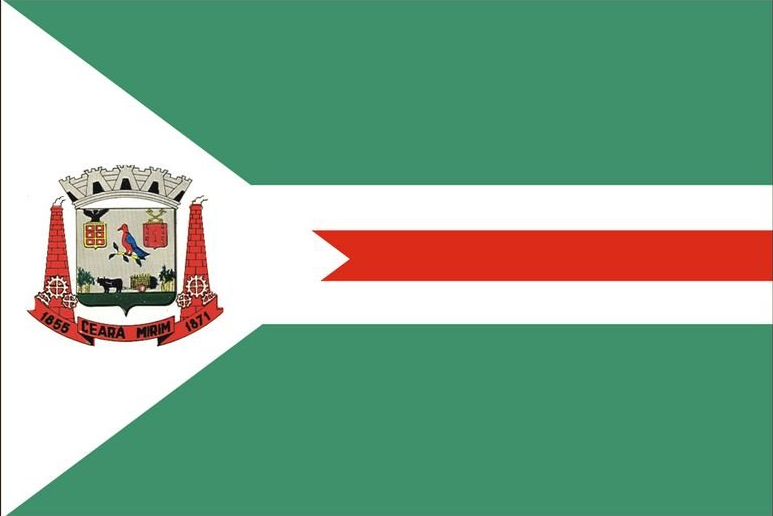
Ceará-Mirim

Chapadinha

Chapecó

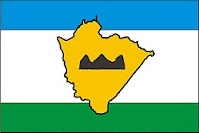
Chã Preta

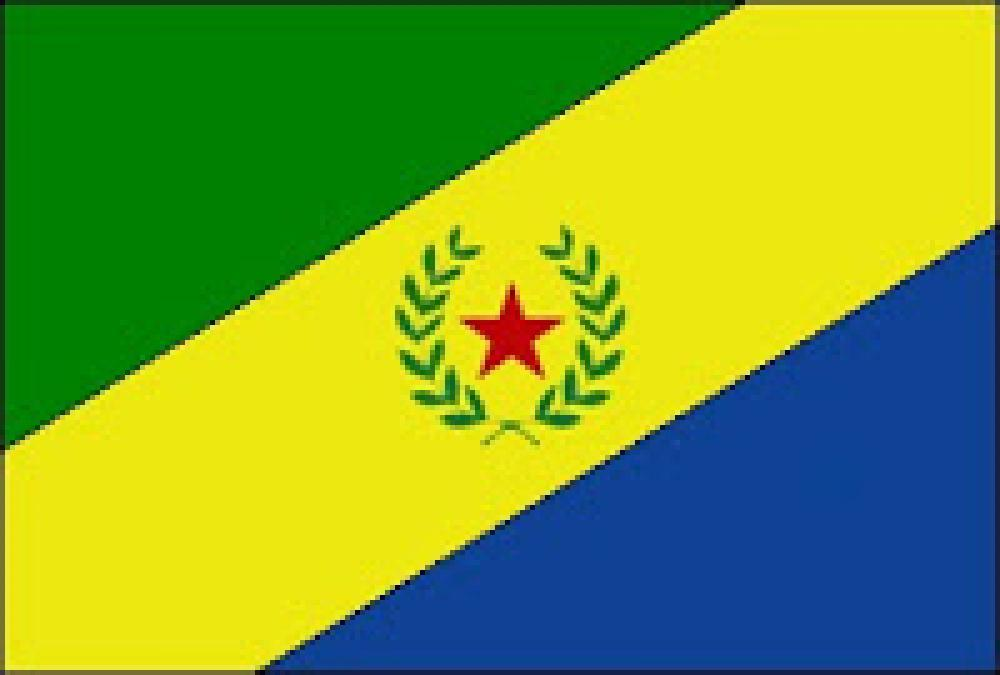
Cidade Ocidental

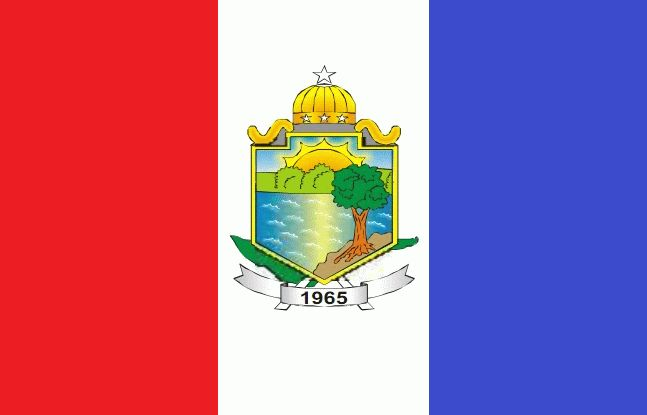
Coari

Codó

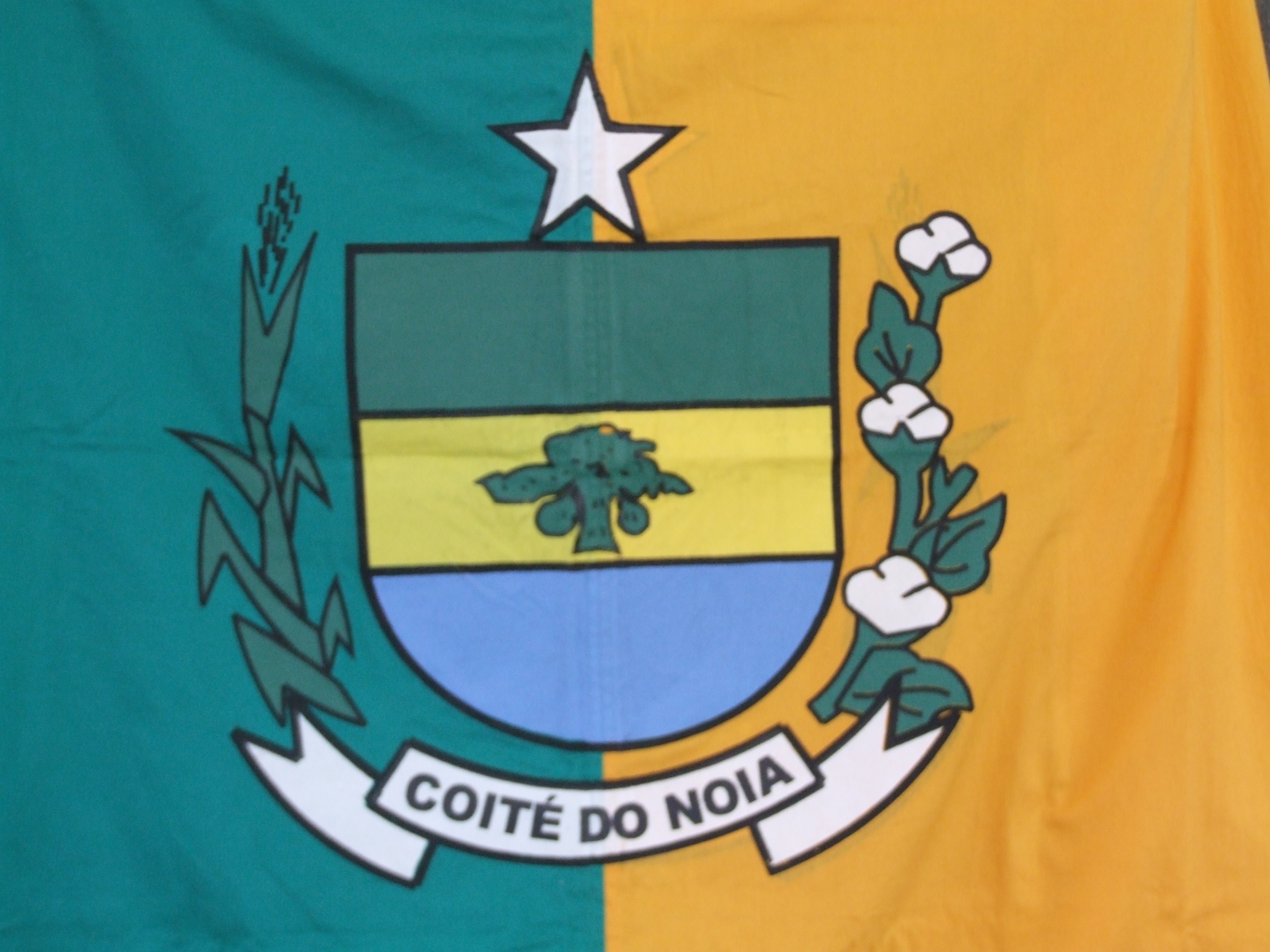
Coité do Nóia

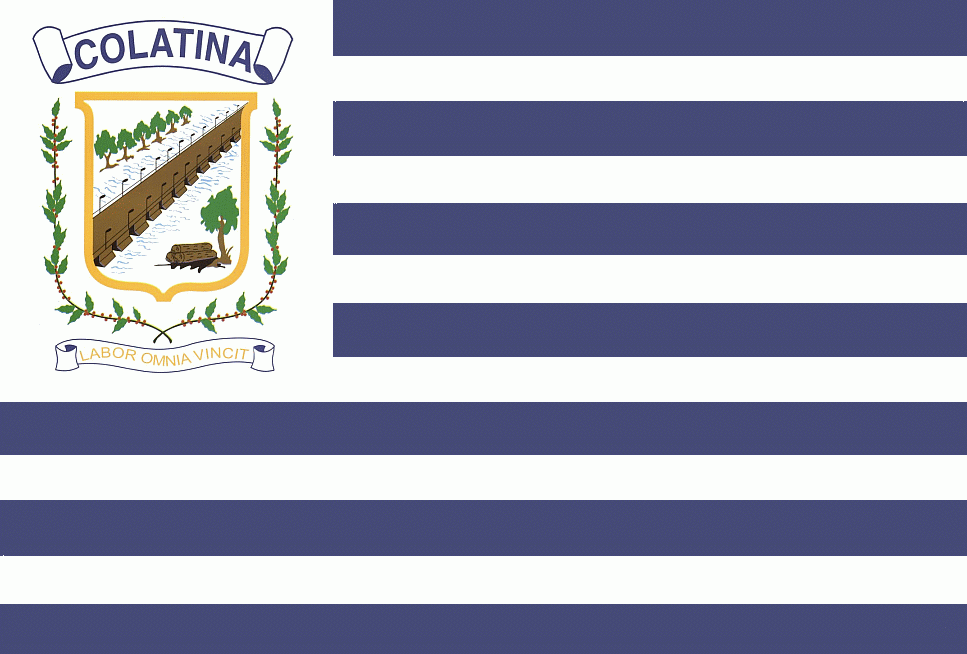
Colatina

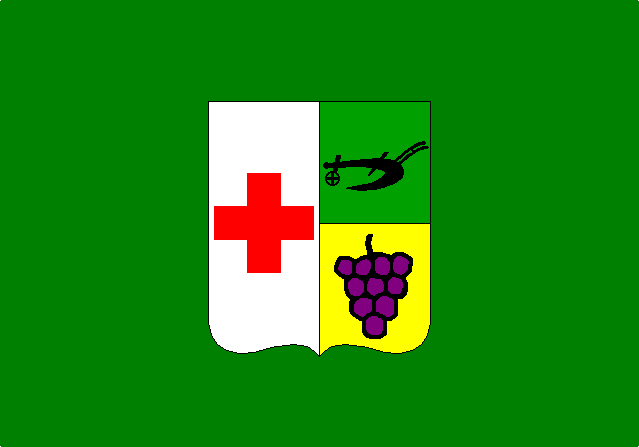
Colombo

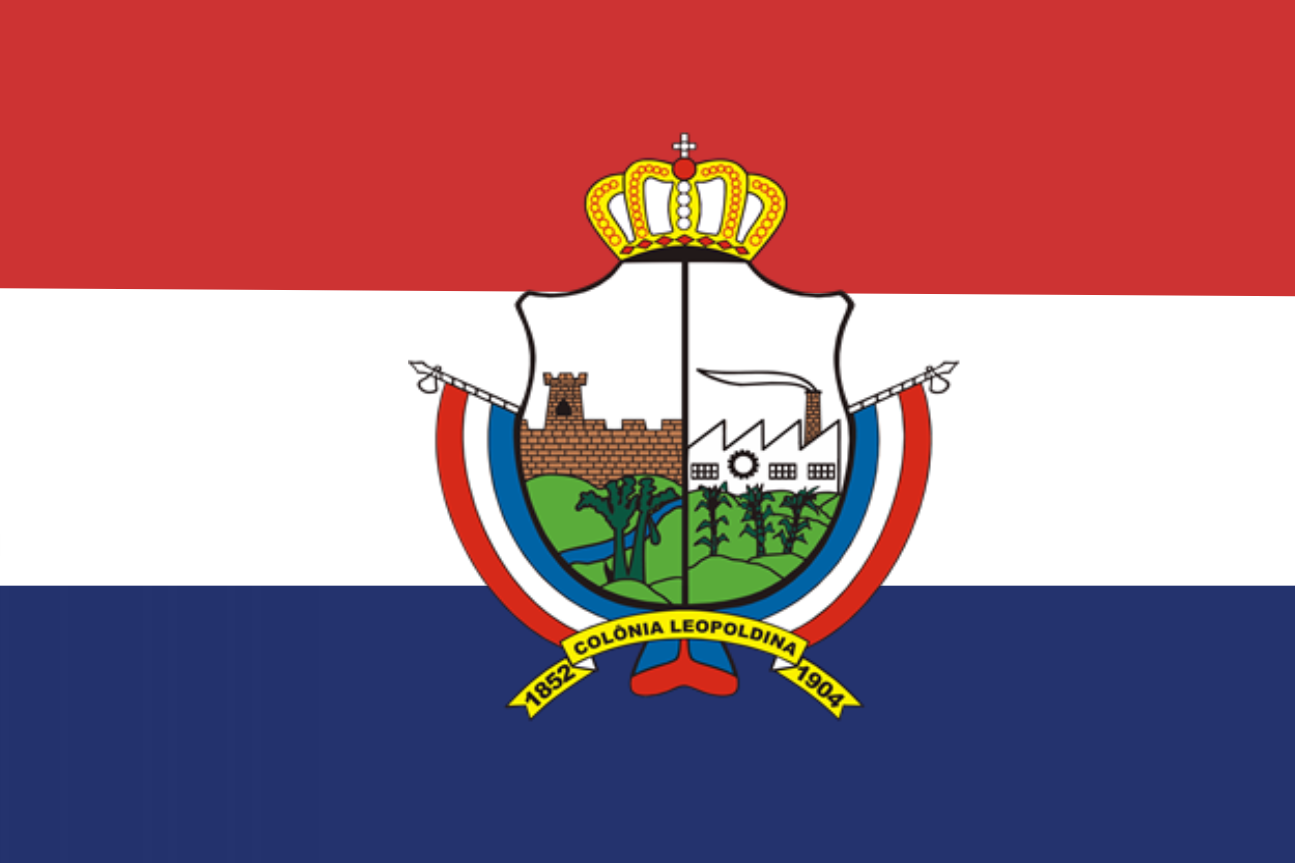
Colônia Leopoldina

Concórdia

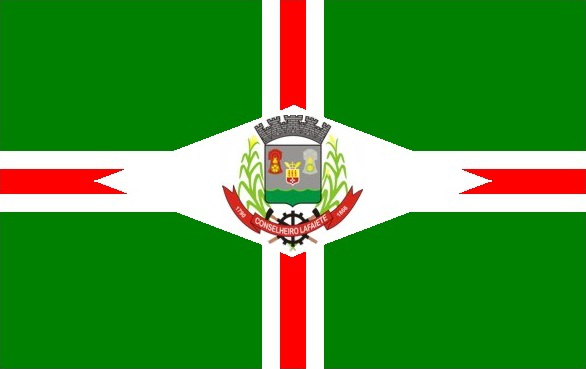
Conselheiro Lafaiete

Contagem

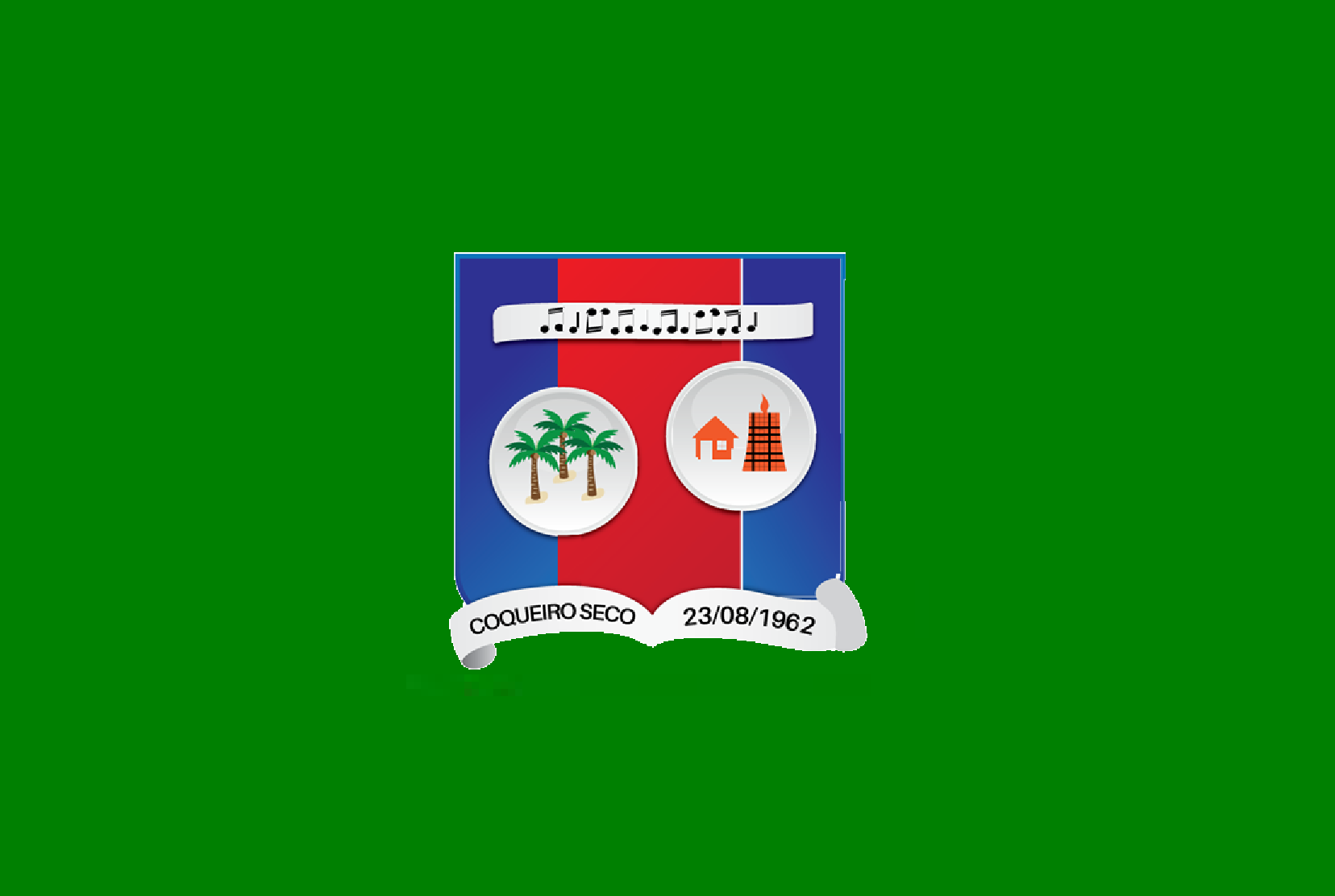
Coqueiro Seco

Coronel Fabriciano

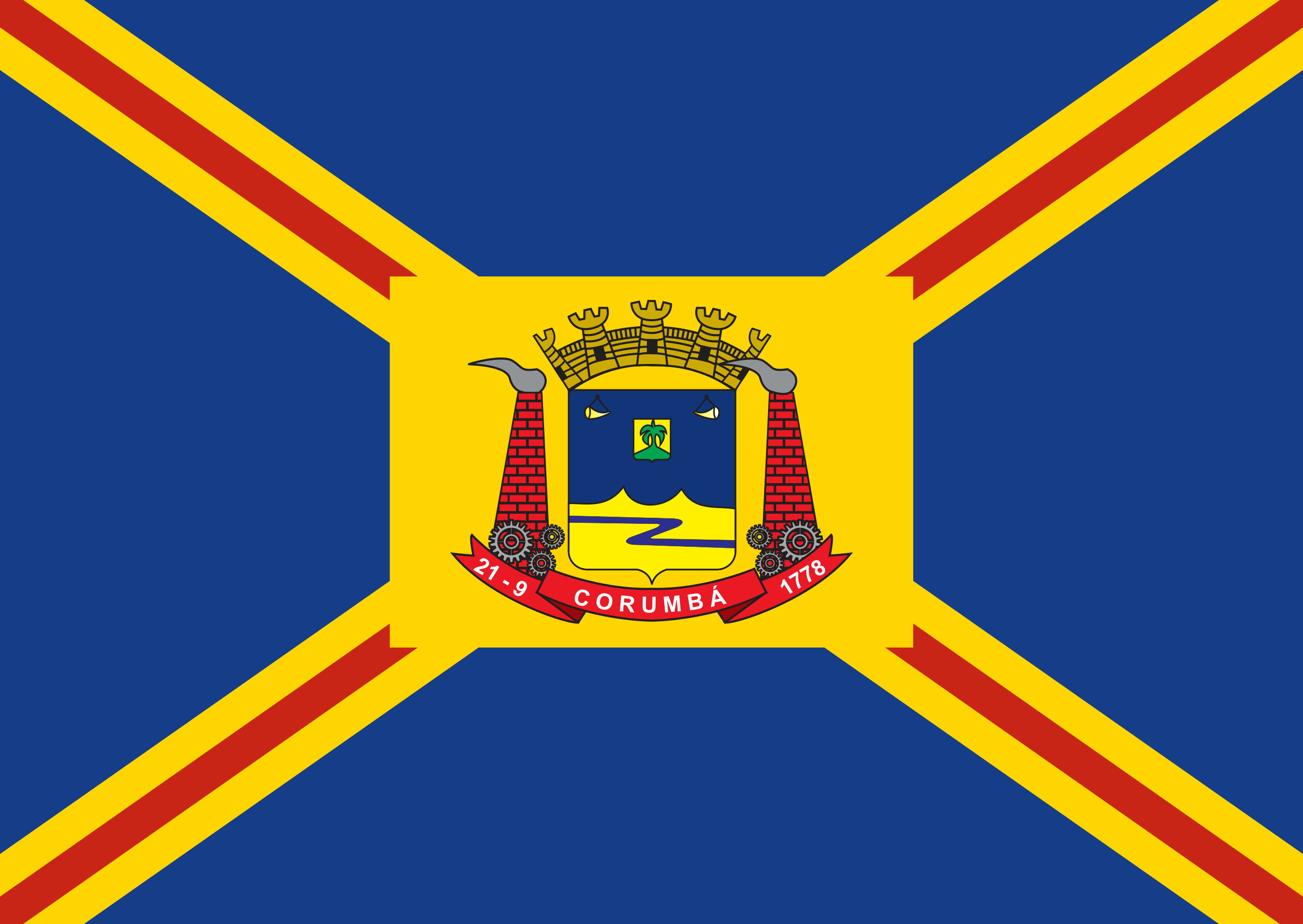
Corumbá

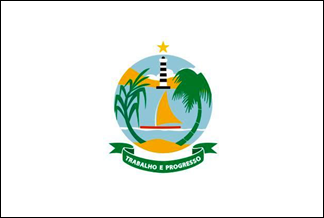
Coruripe

Cotia

Craíbas

Crateús

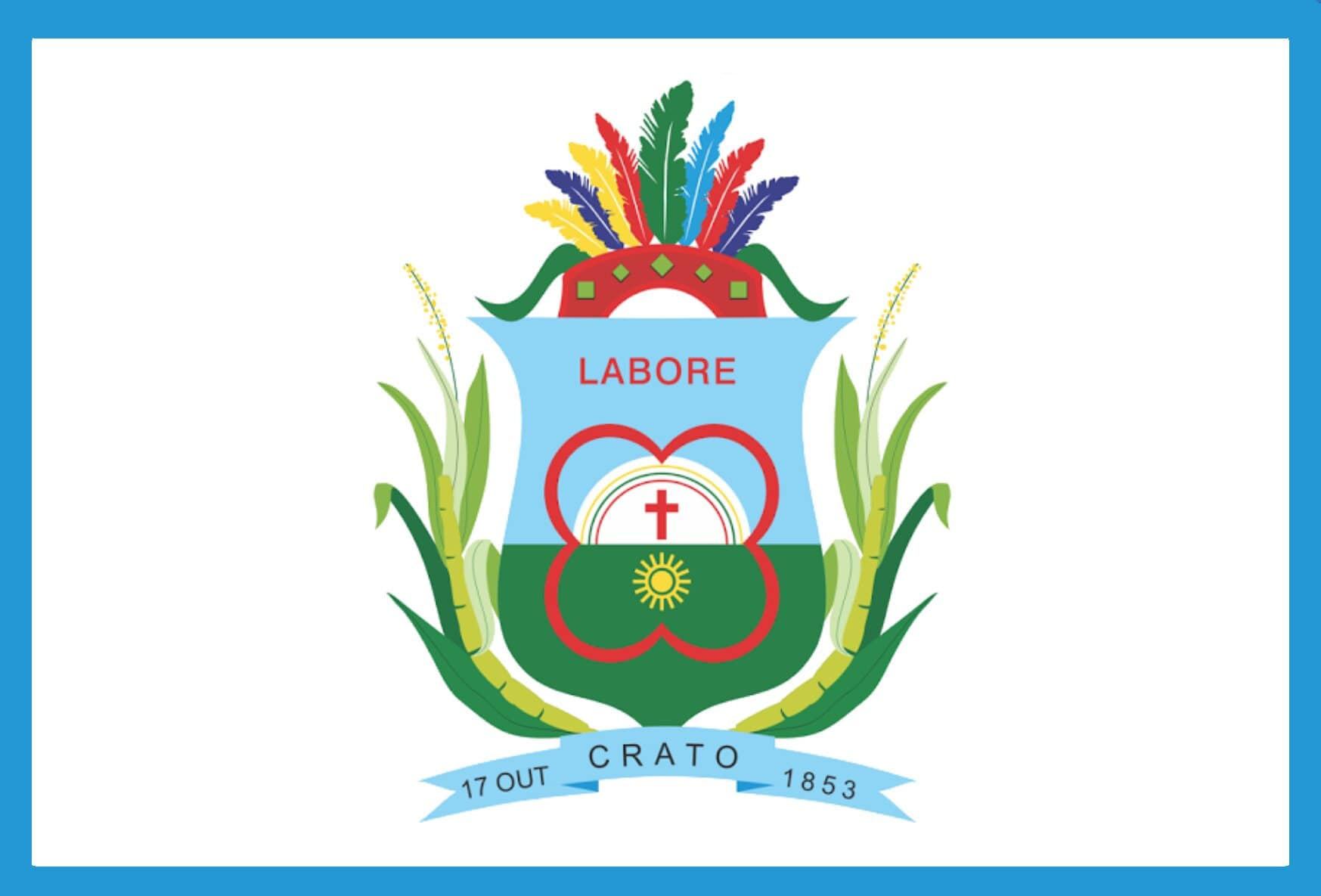
Crato

Criciúma

Cruzeiro

Cruzeiro do Sul

Cubatão

Cuiabá

Curitiba

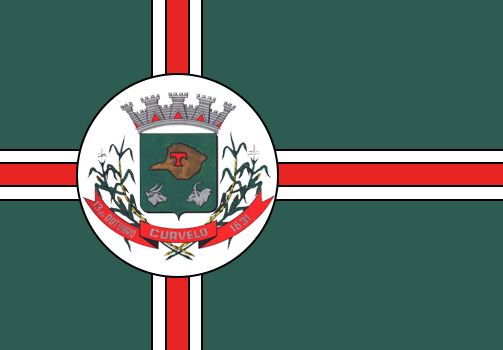
Curvelo

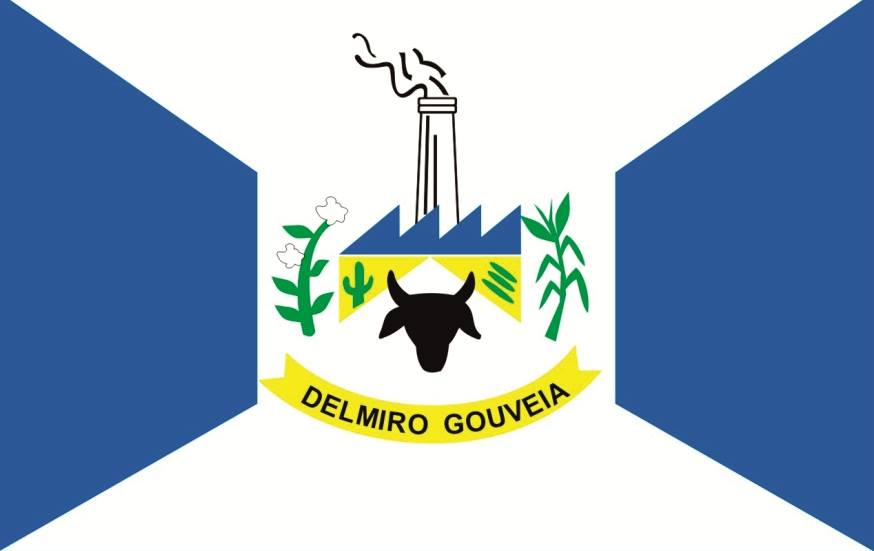
Delmiro Gouveia

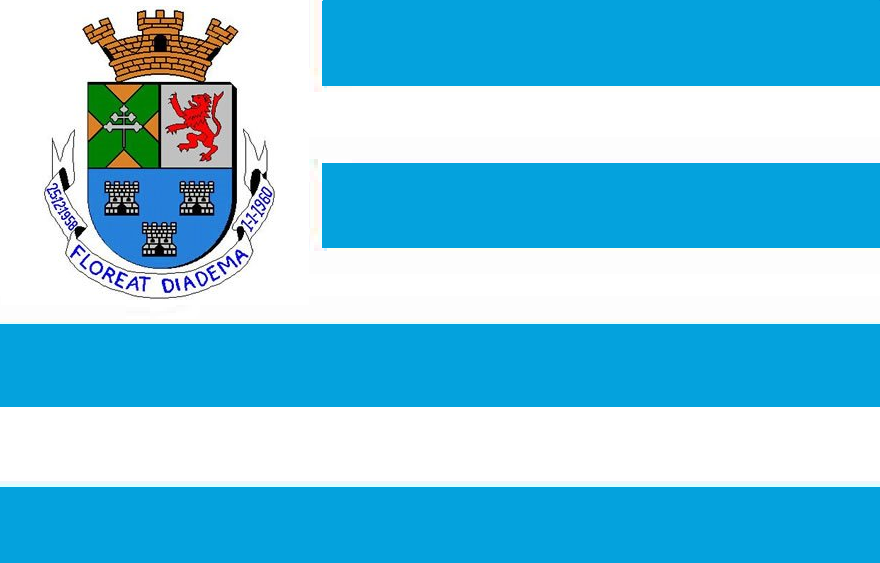
Diadema

Divinópolis

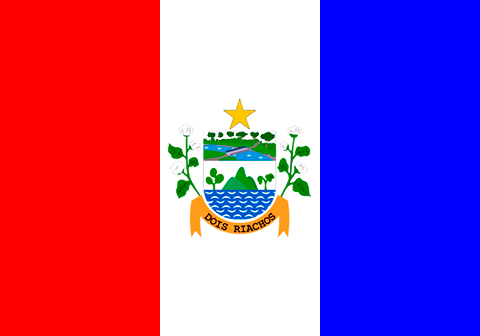
Dois Riachos

Dourados

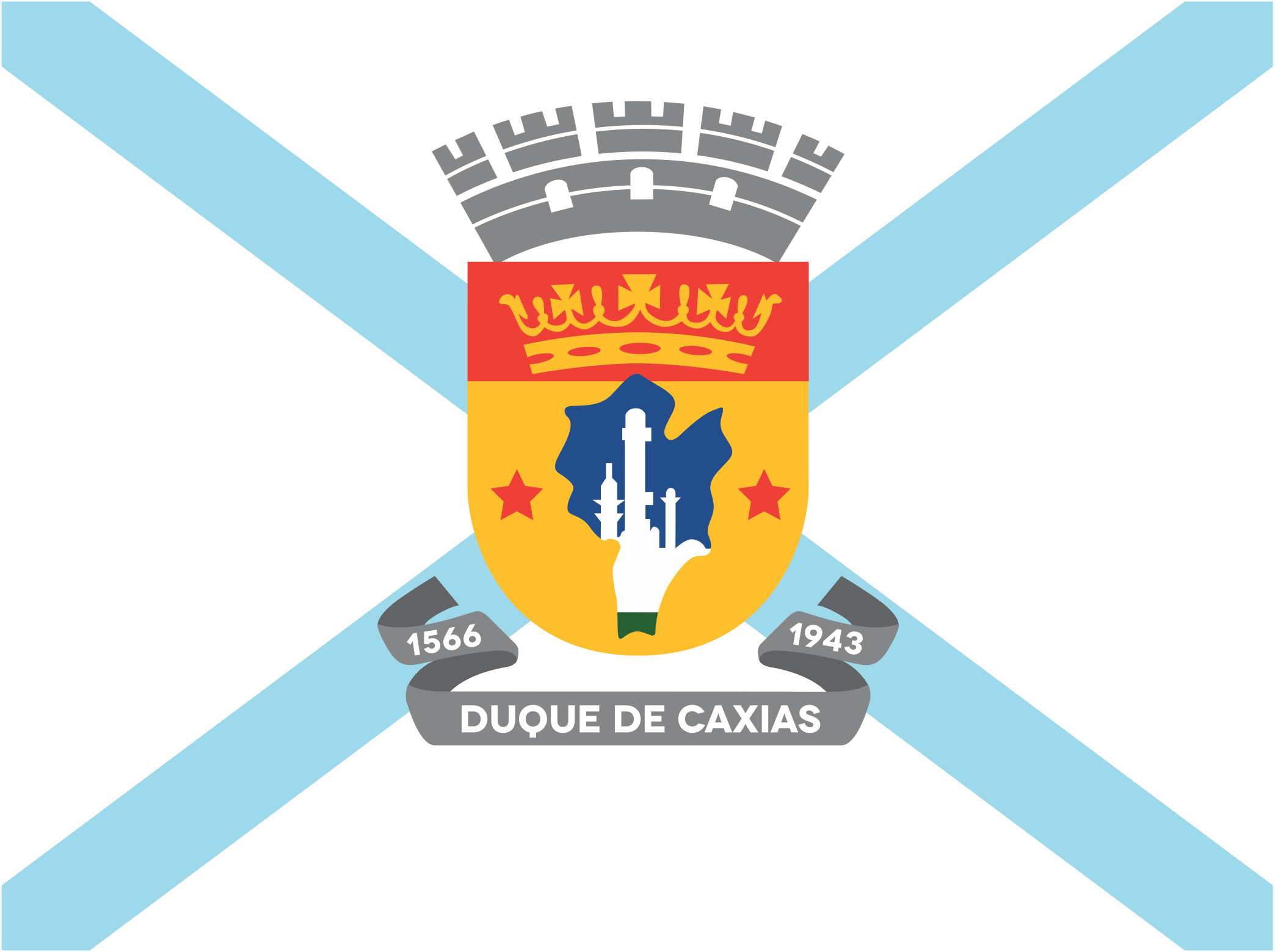
Duque de Caxias

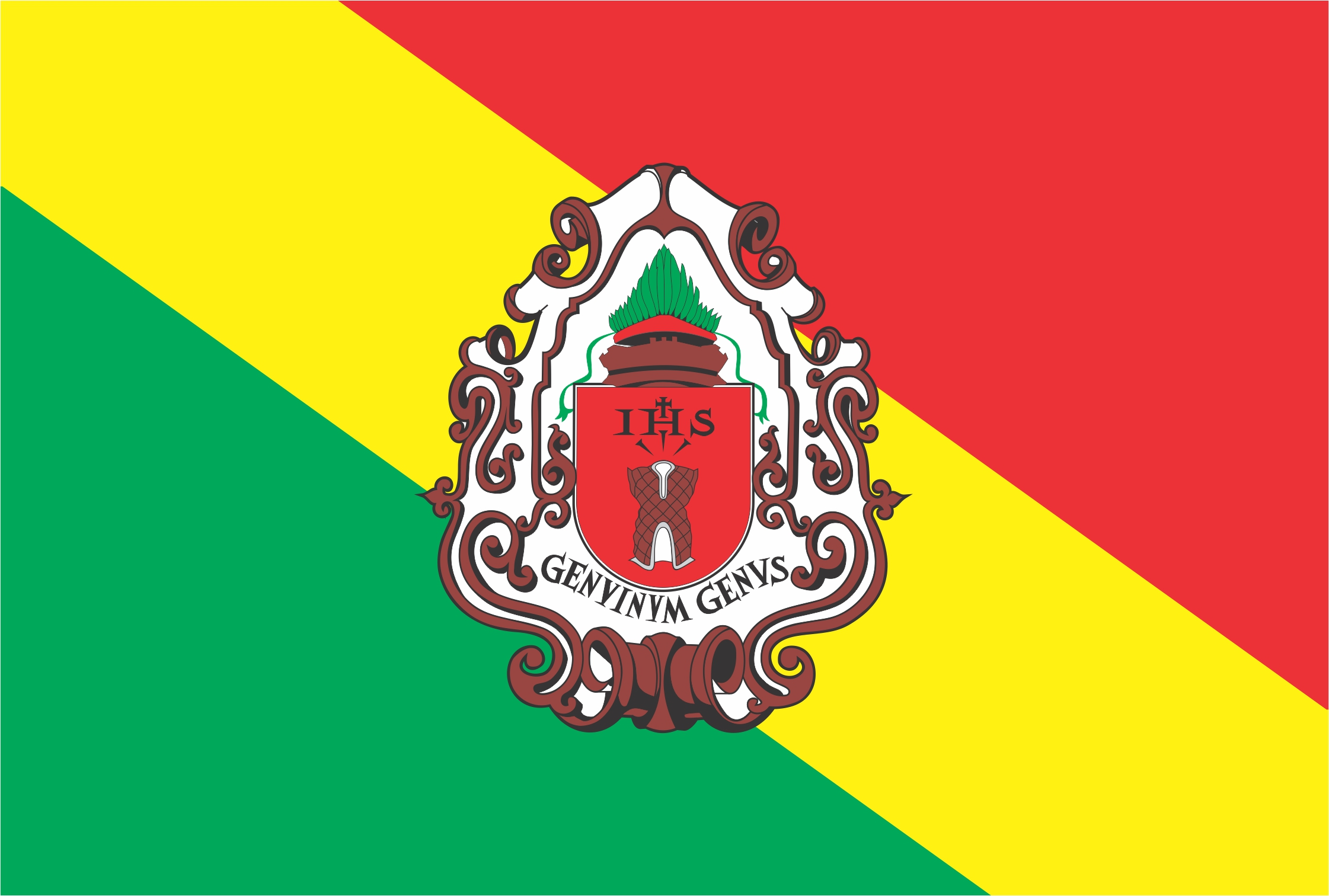
Embu das Artes

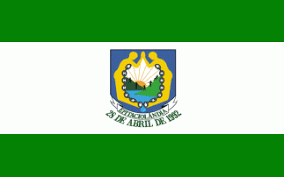
Epitaciolândia

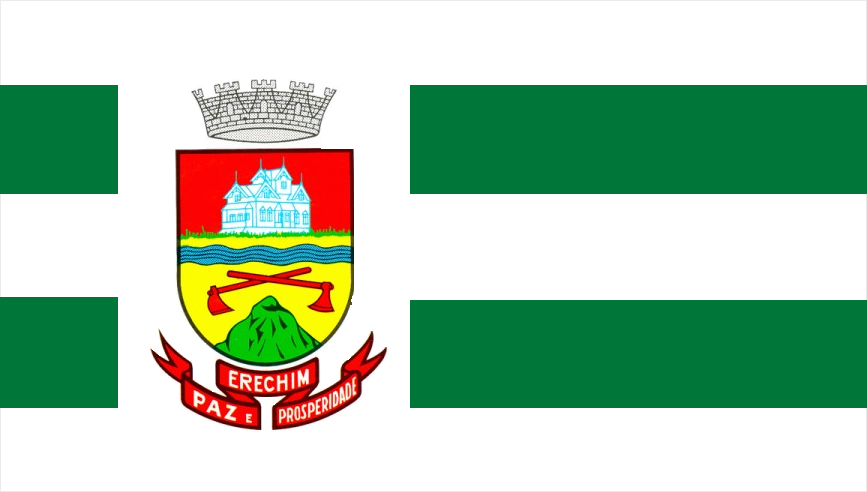
Erechim

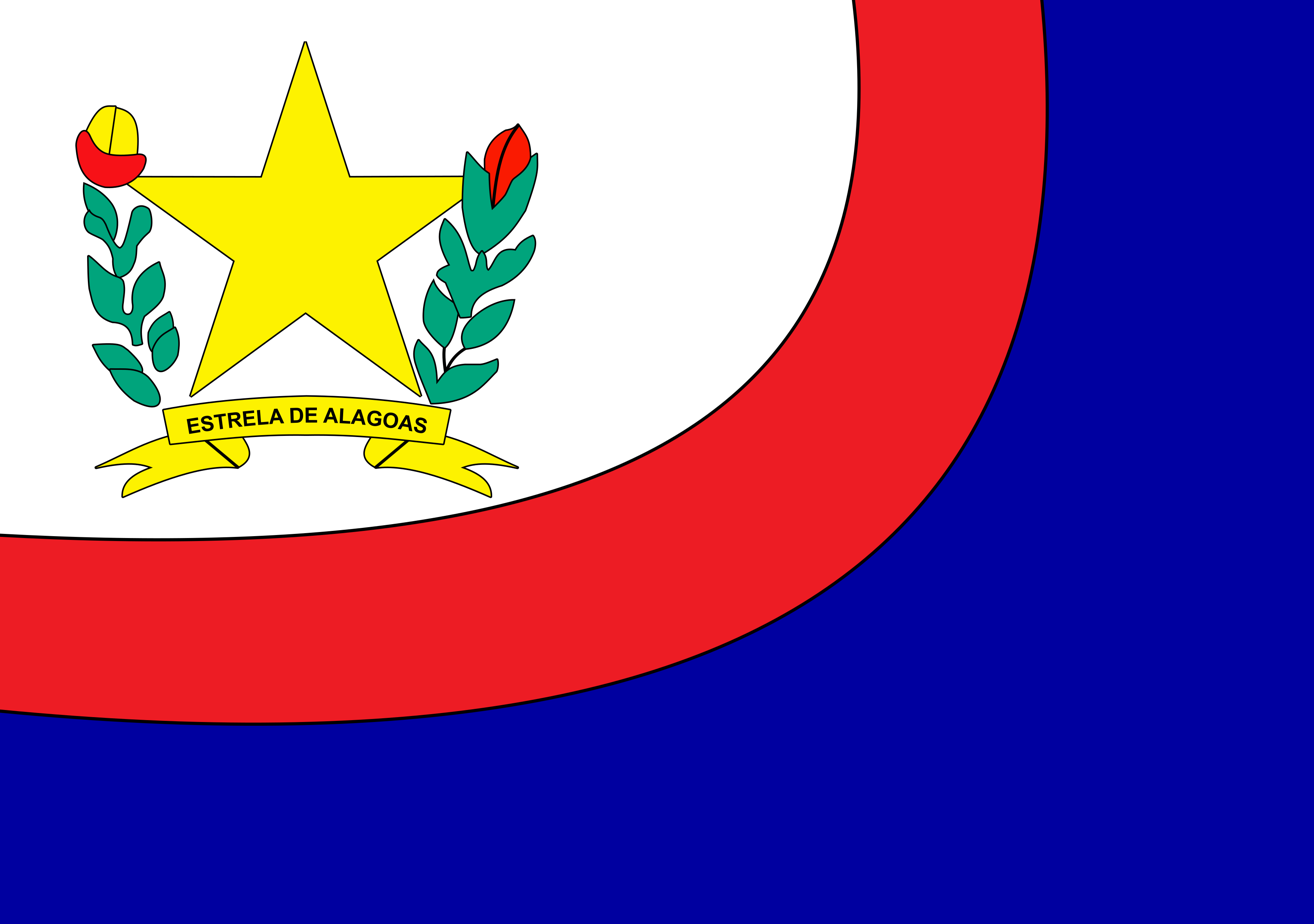
Estrela de Alagoas

Eunápolis

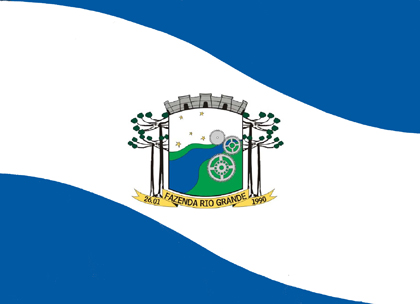
Fazenda Rio Grande

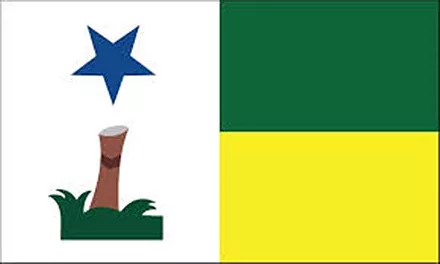
Feijó

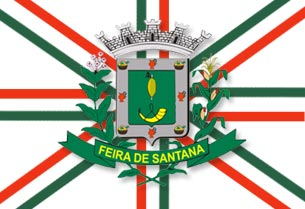
Feira de Santana

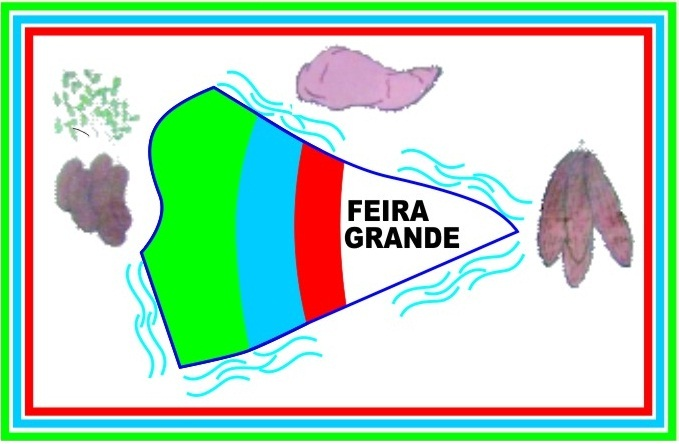
Feira Grande

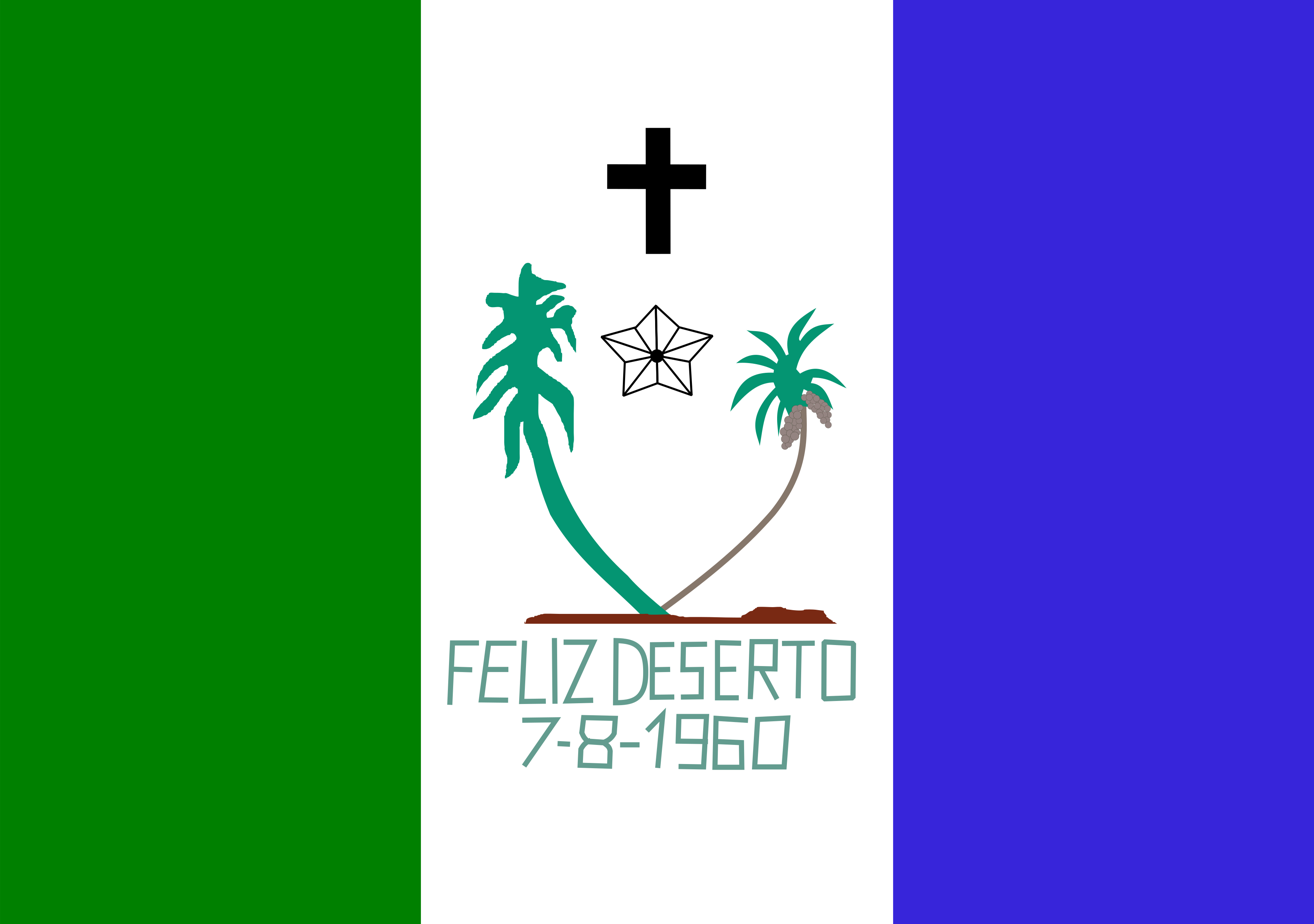
Feliz Deserto

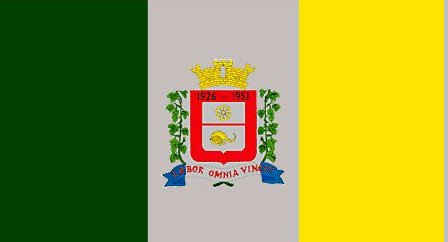
Ferraz de Vasconcelos

Ferreira Gomes

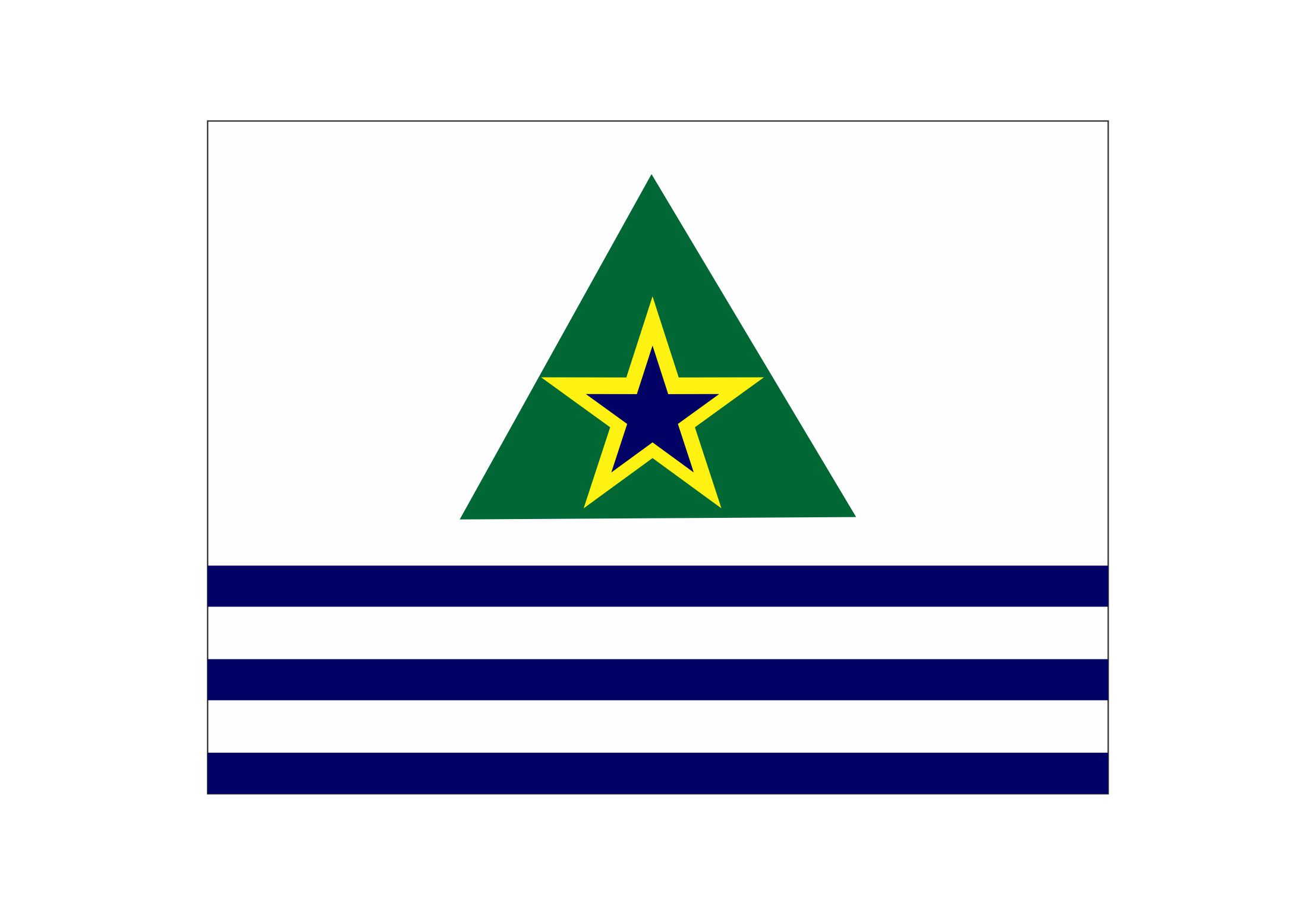
Figueirópolis d'Oeste

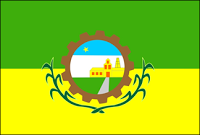
Flexeiras

Florianópolis

Formosa

Fortaleza

Foz do Iguaçu

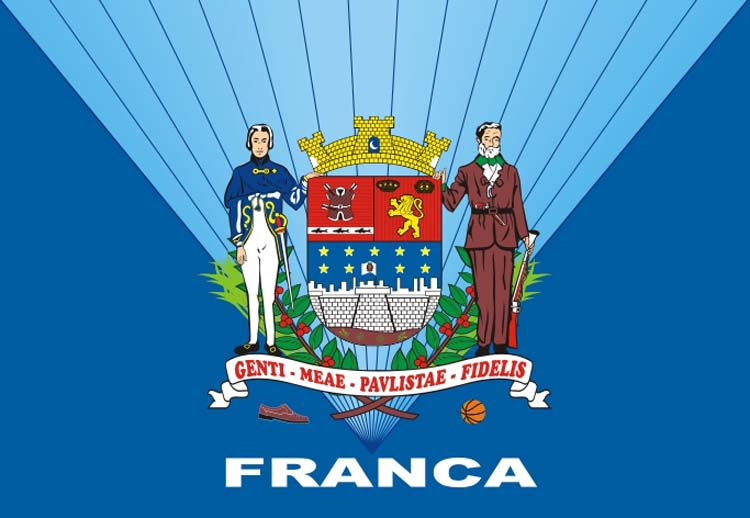
Franca

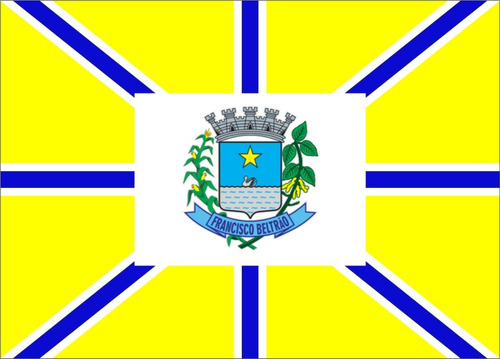
Francisco Beltrão

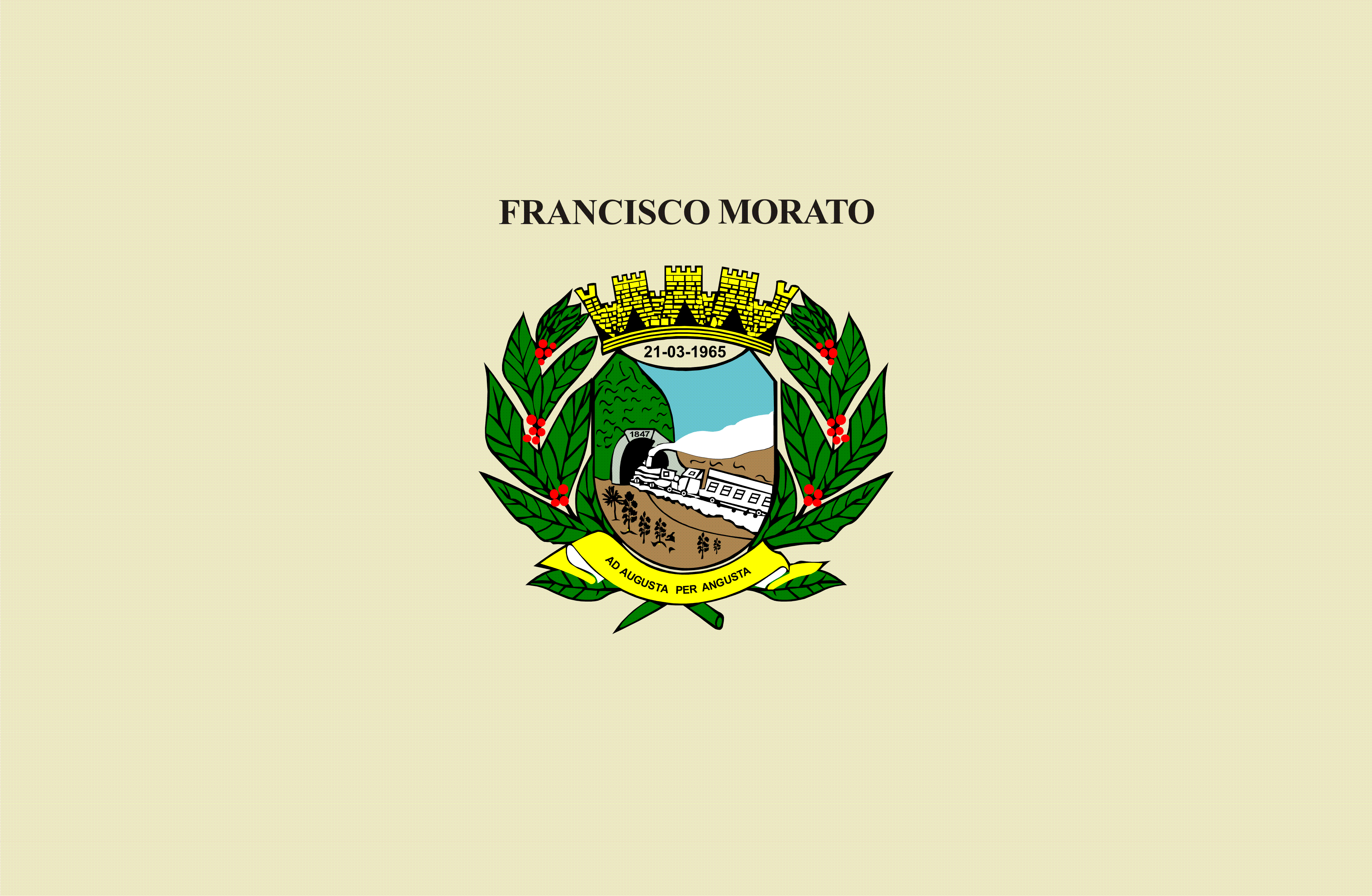
Francisco Morato

Franco da Rocha

Garanhuns

Girau do Ponciano

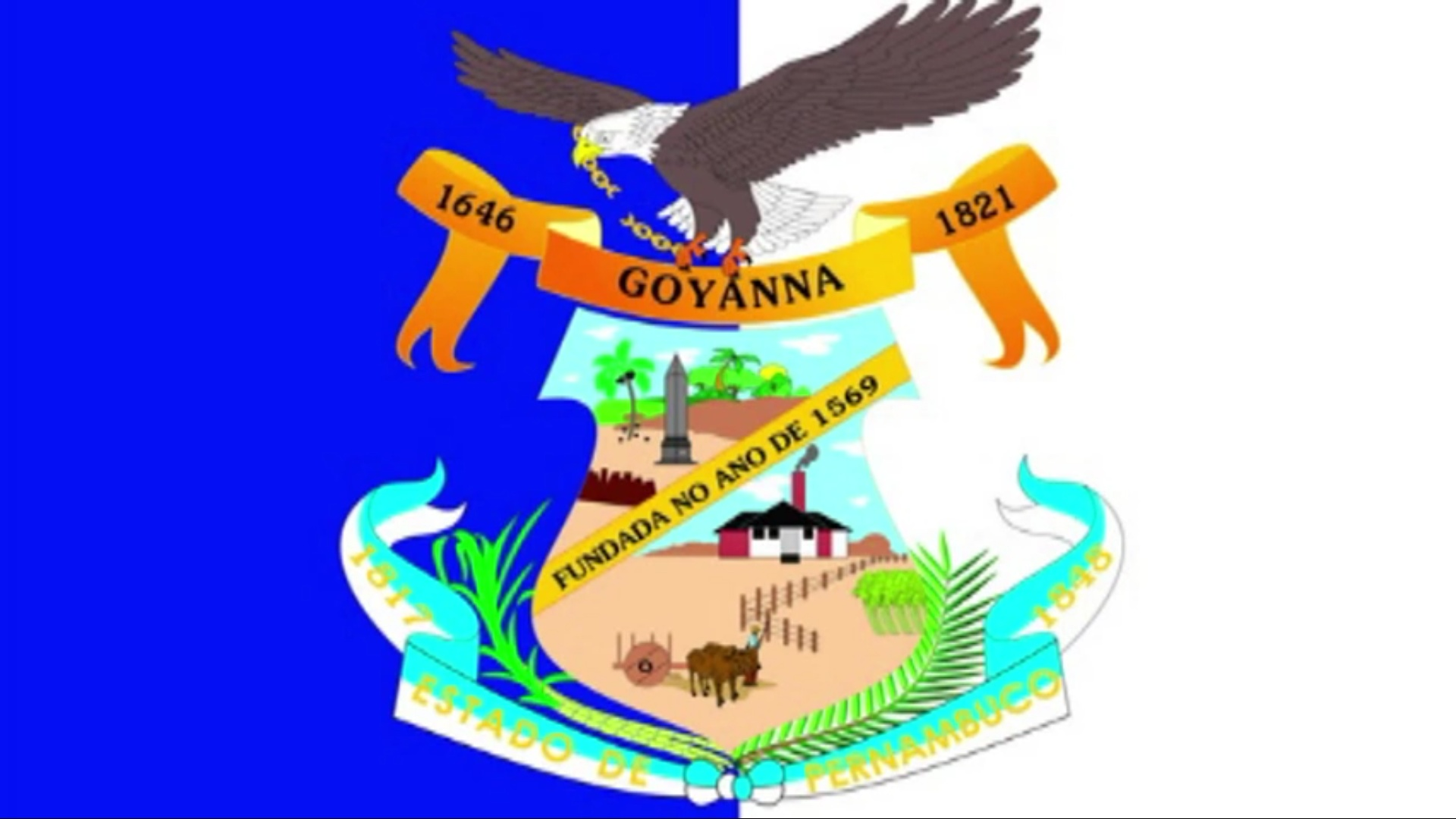
Goiana

Goiânia

Governador Valadares

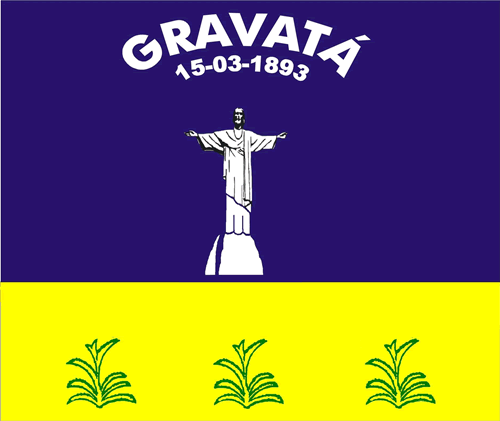
Gravatá

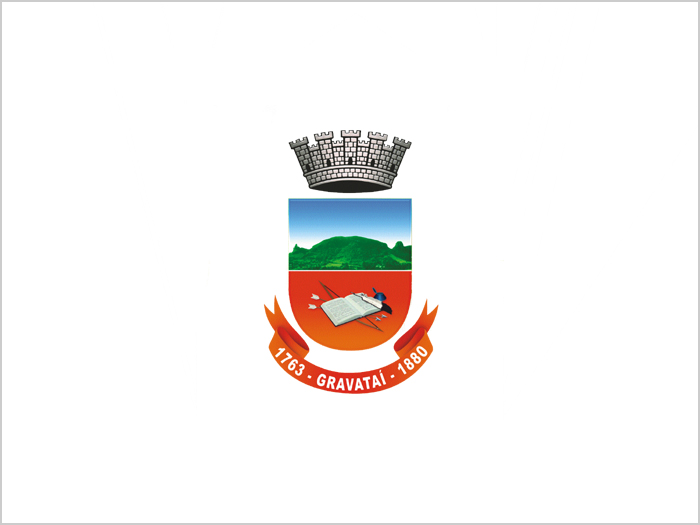
Gravataí

Guarabira

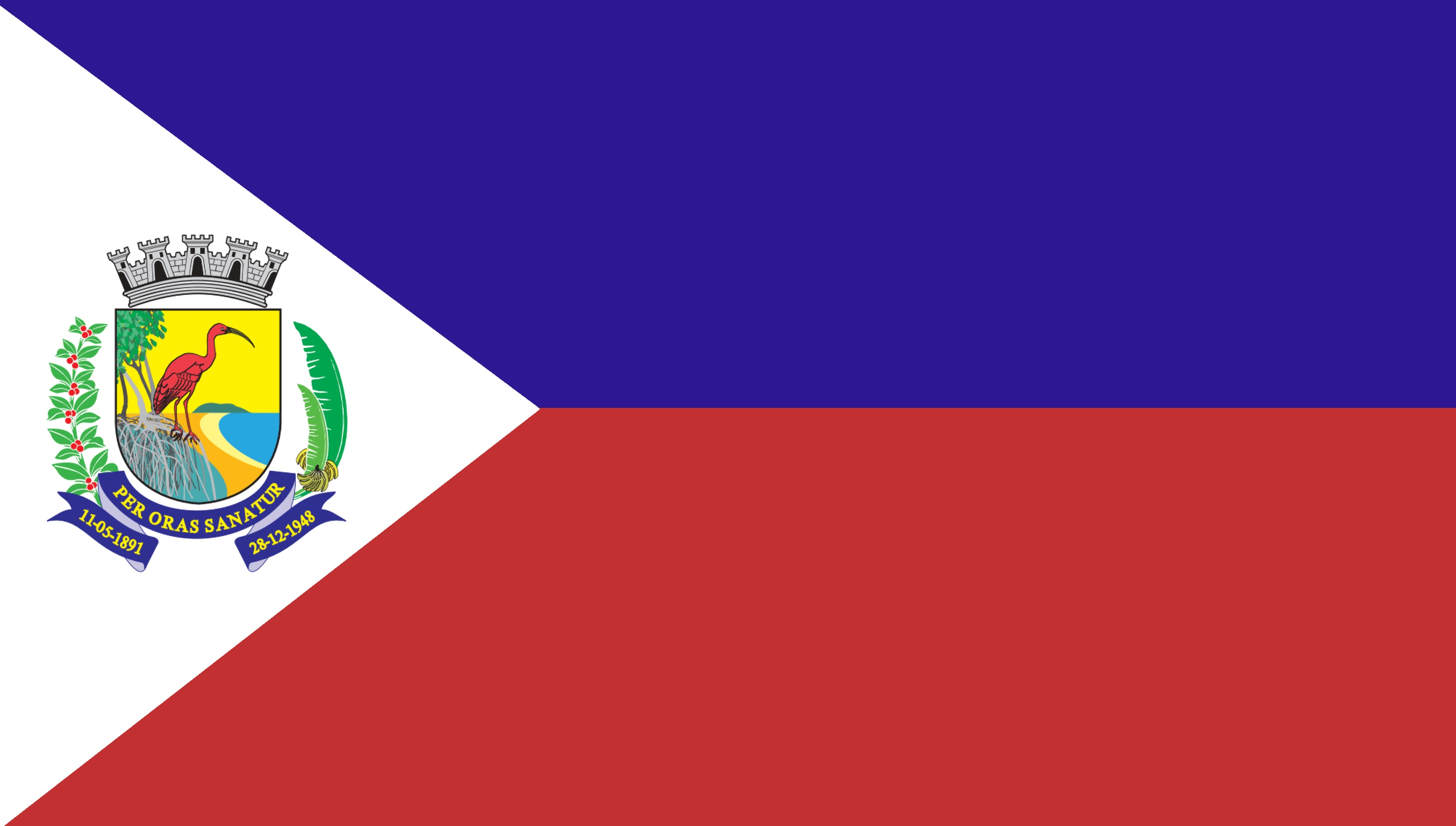
Guarapari

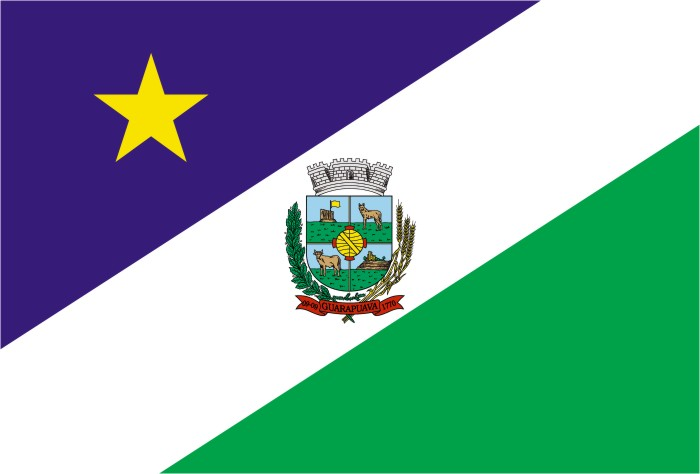
Guarapuava

Guaratinguetá

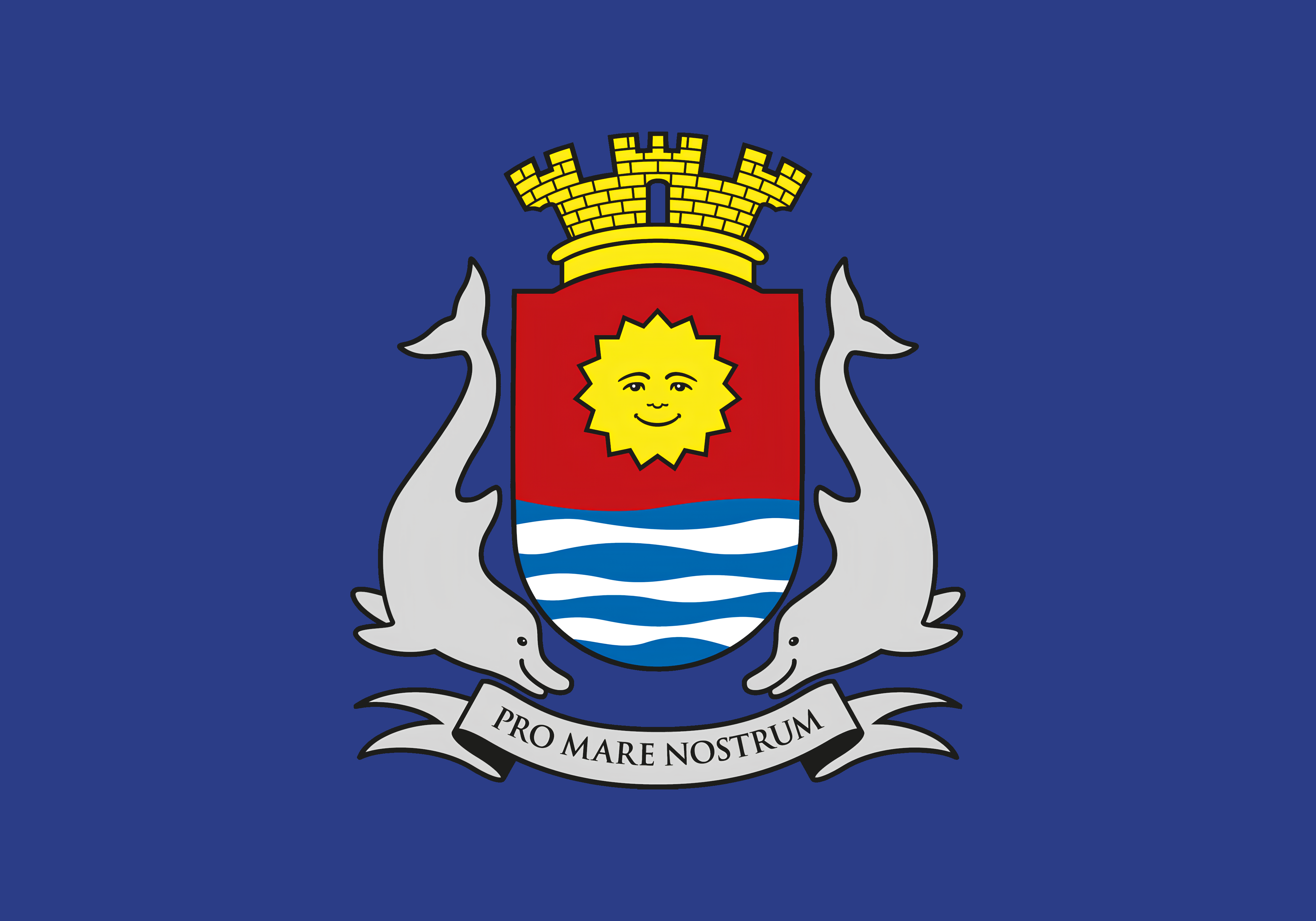
Guarujá

Guarulhos

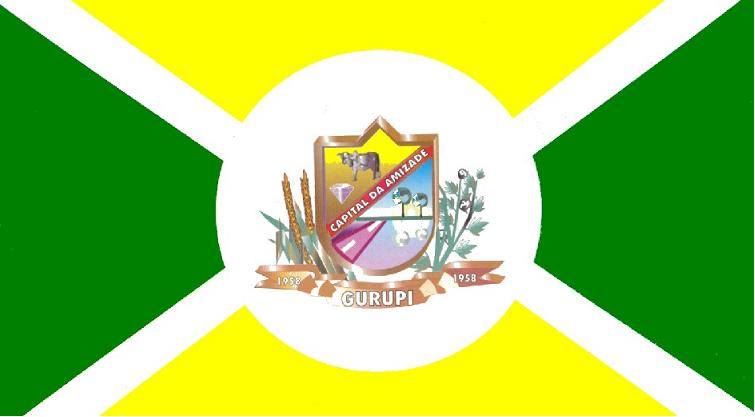
Gurupi

Hortolândia

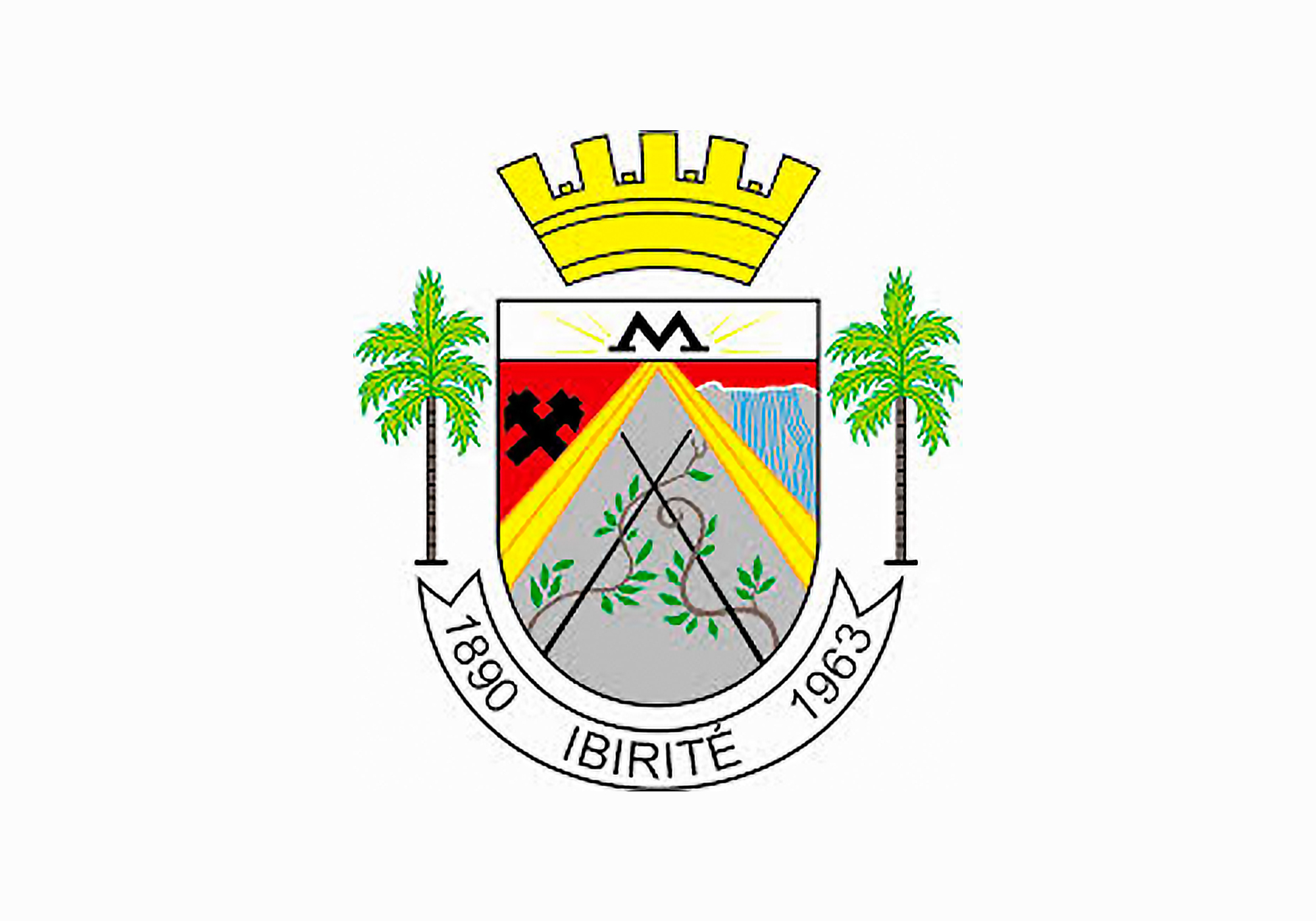
Ibirité

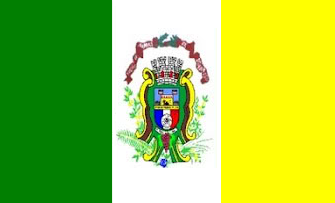
Igarassu

Iguatu

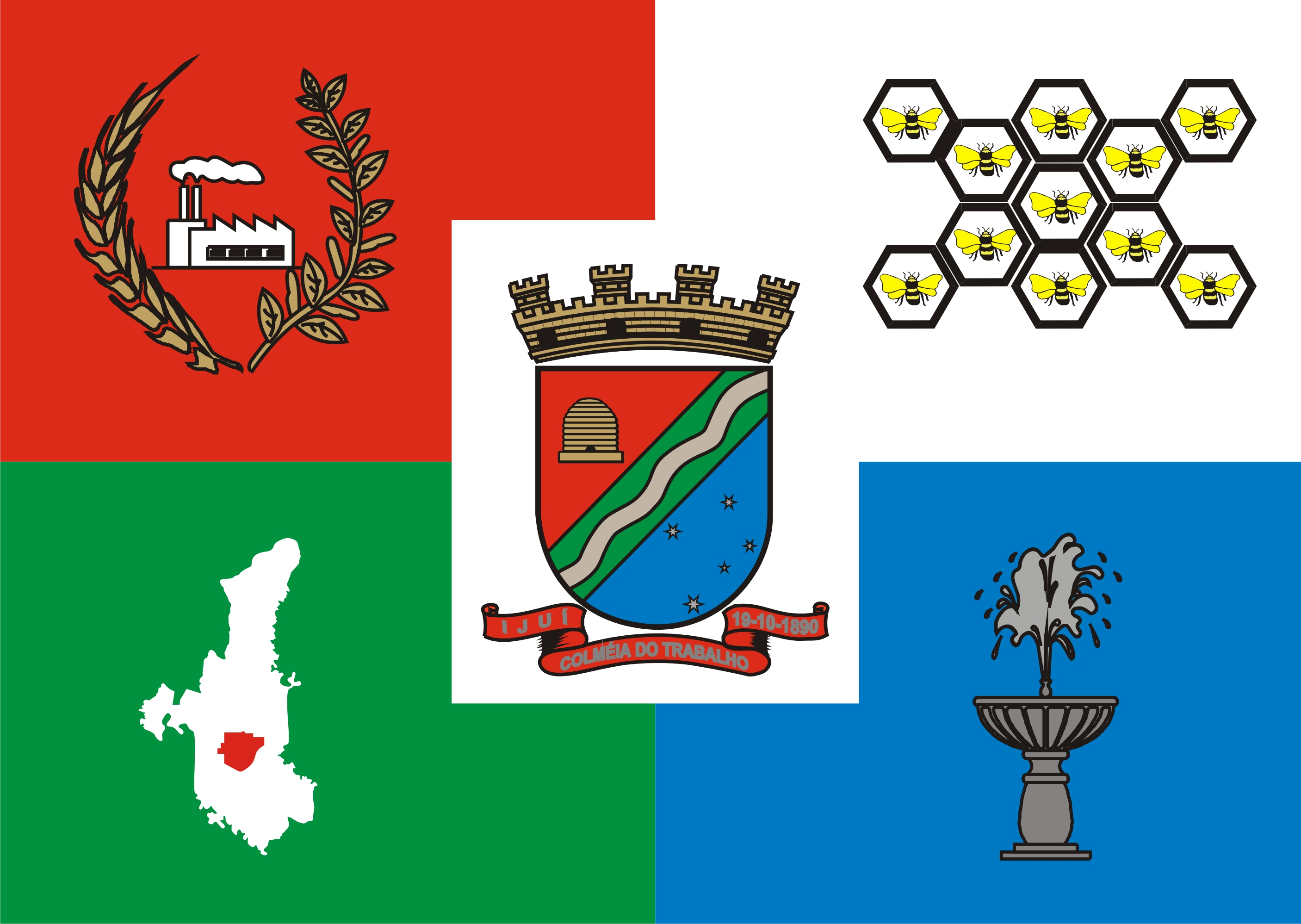
Ijuí

Ilhabela

Ilha Comprida

Ilhéus

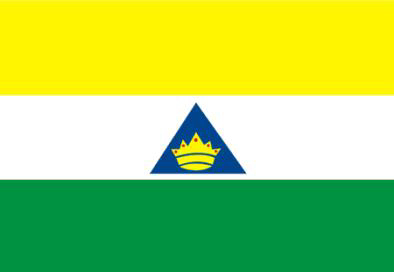
Imperatriz

Indaiatuba

Ipatinga

Ipiaú

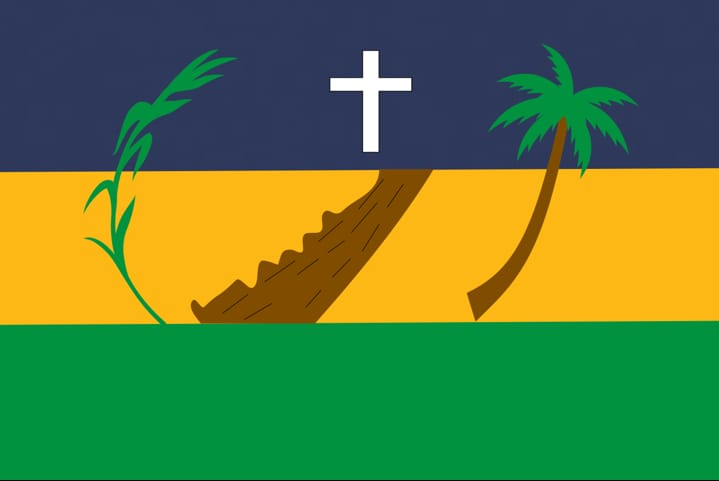
Ipojuca

Itabaiana

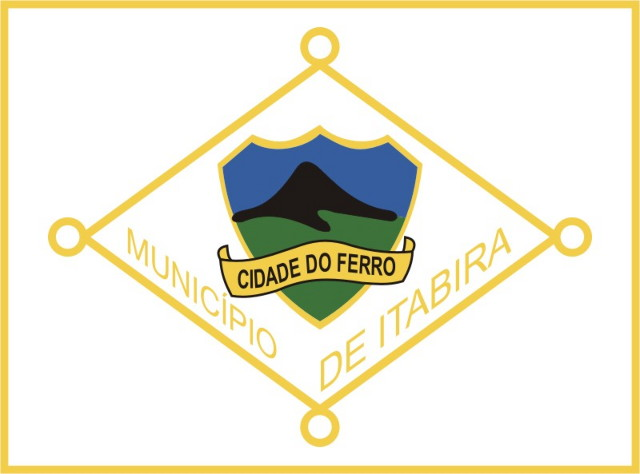
Itabira

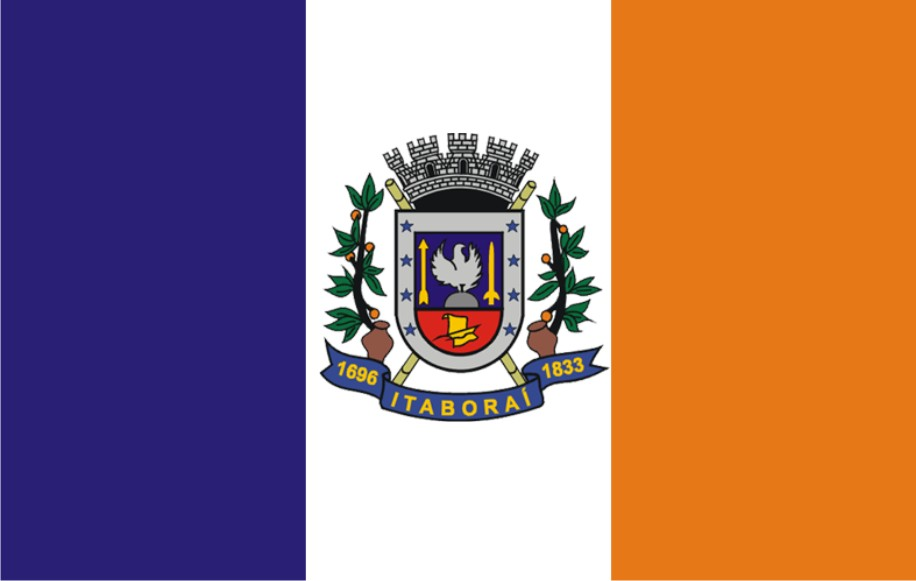
Itaboraí

Itabuna

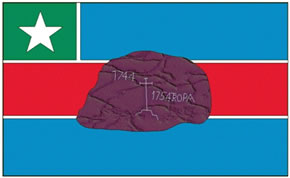
Itacoatiara

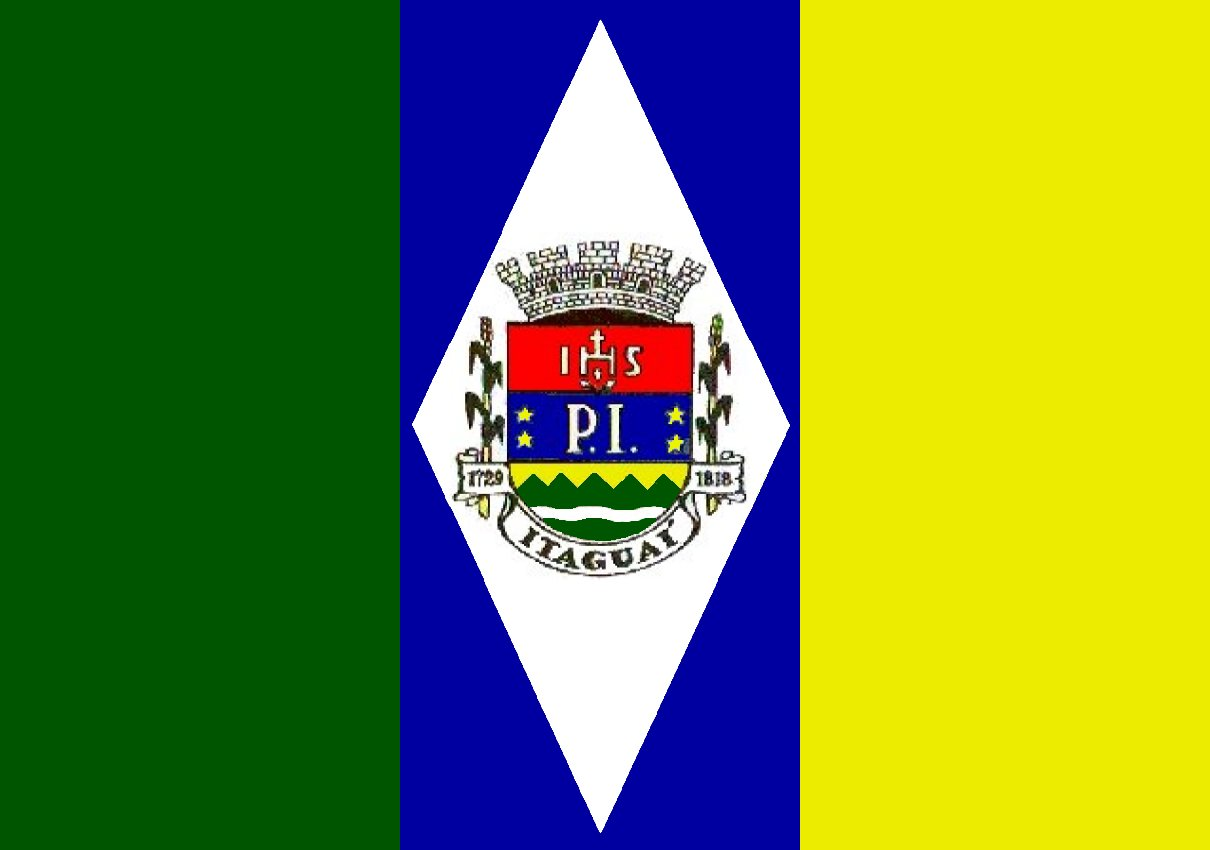
Itaguaí

Itaituba

Itajaí

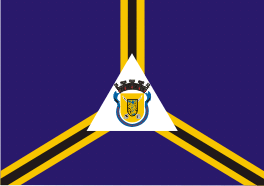
Itajubá

Itamarandiba

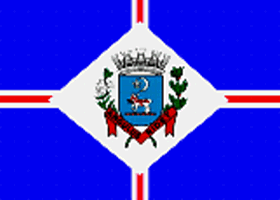
Itanhaém

Itapecerica da Serra

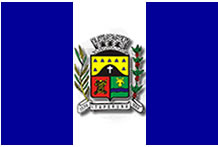
Itaperuna

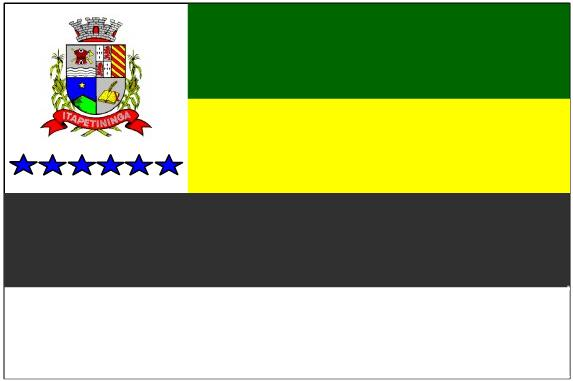
Itapetininga

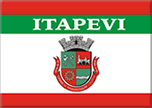
Itapevi

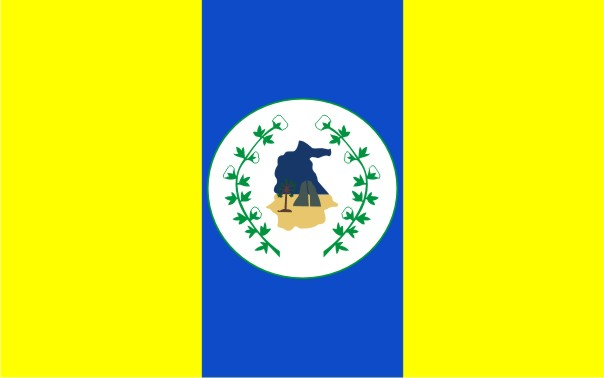
Itapipoca

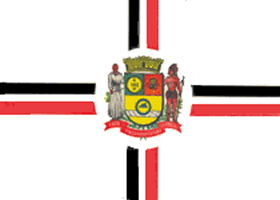
Itaquaquecetuba

Itatiba

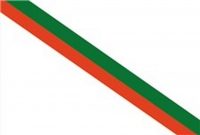
Itaúna

Itu

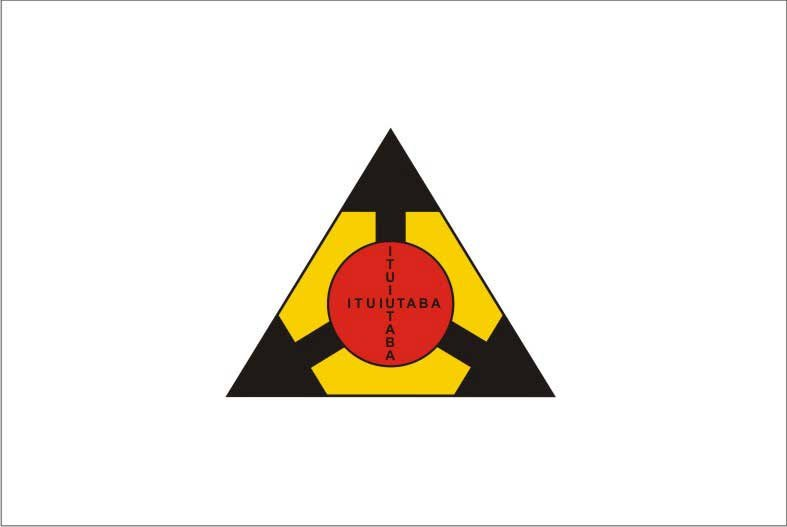
Ituiutaba

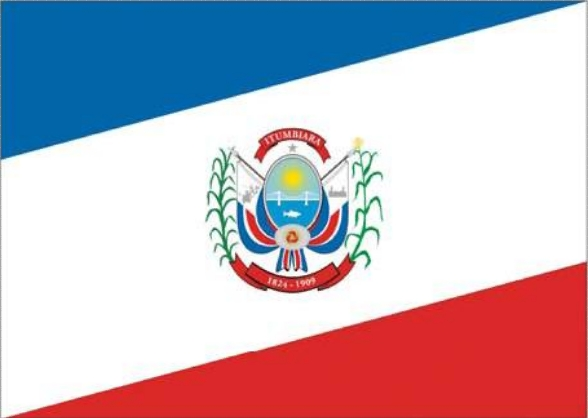
Itumbiara

Jaboatão dos Guararapes

Jaboticabal

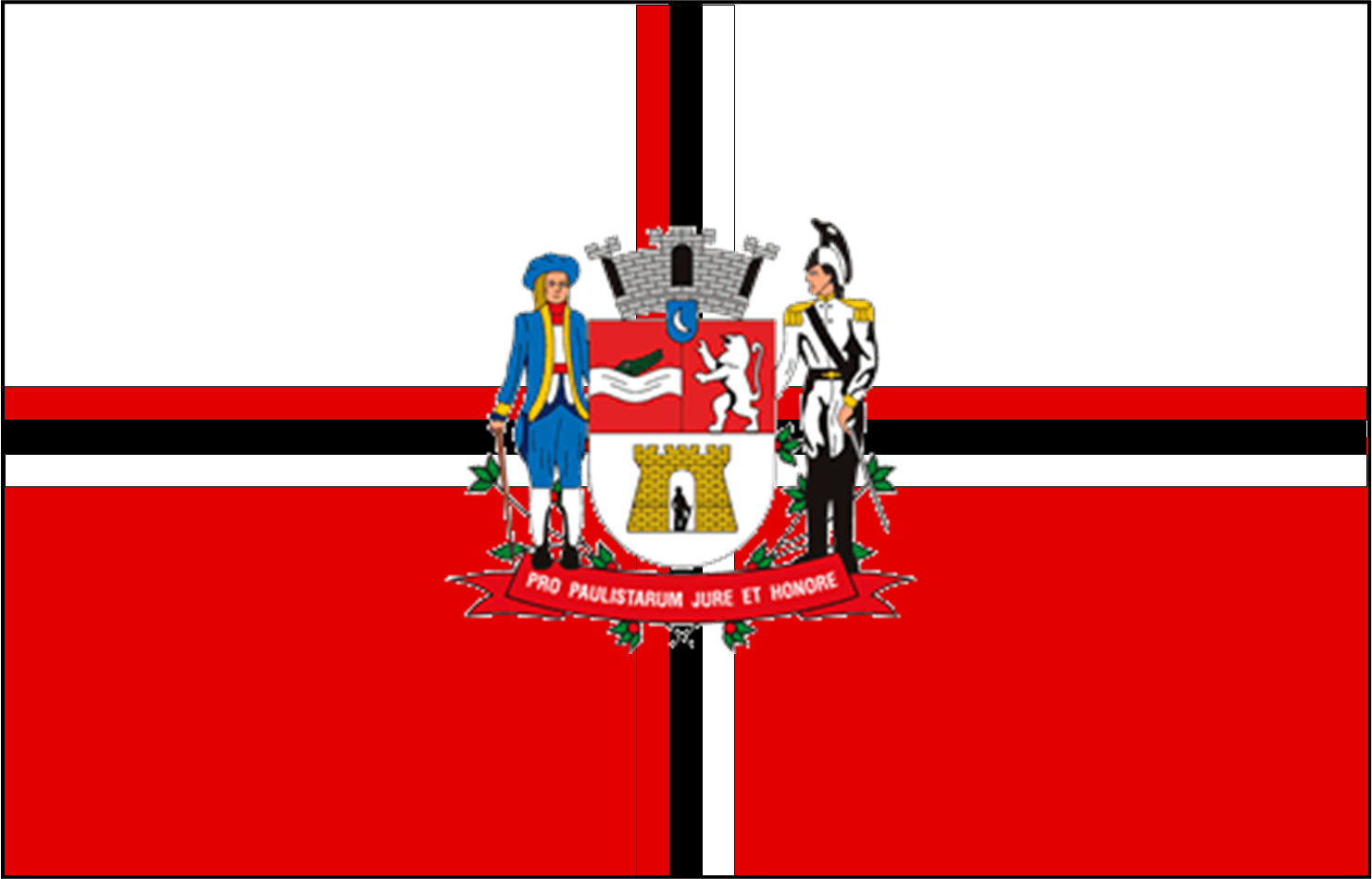
Jacareí

Jacobina

Jandira

Japeri

Jaraguá do Sul

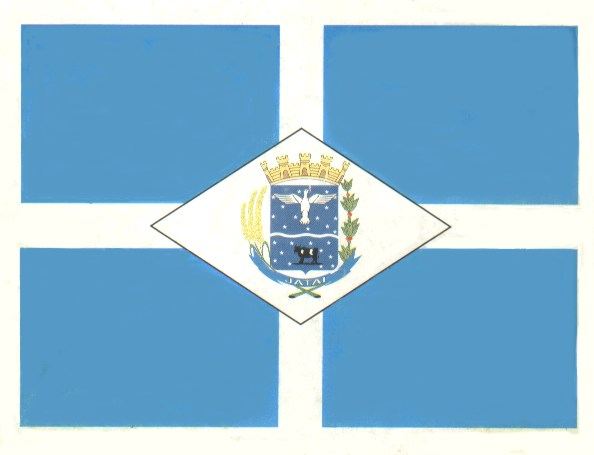
Jataí

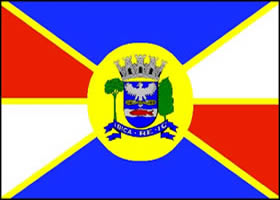
Jaú

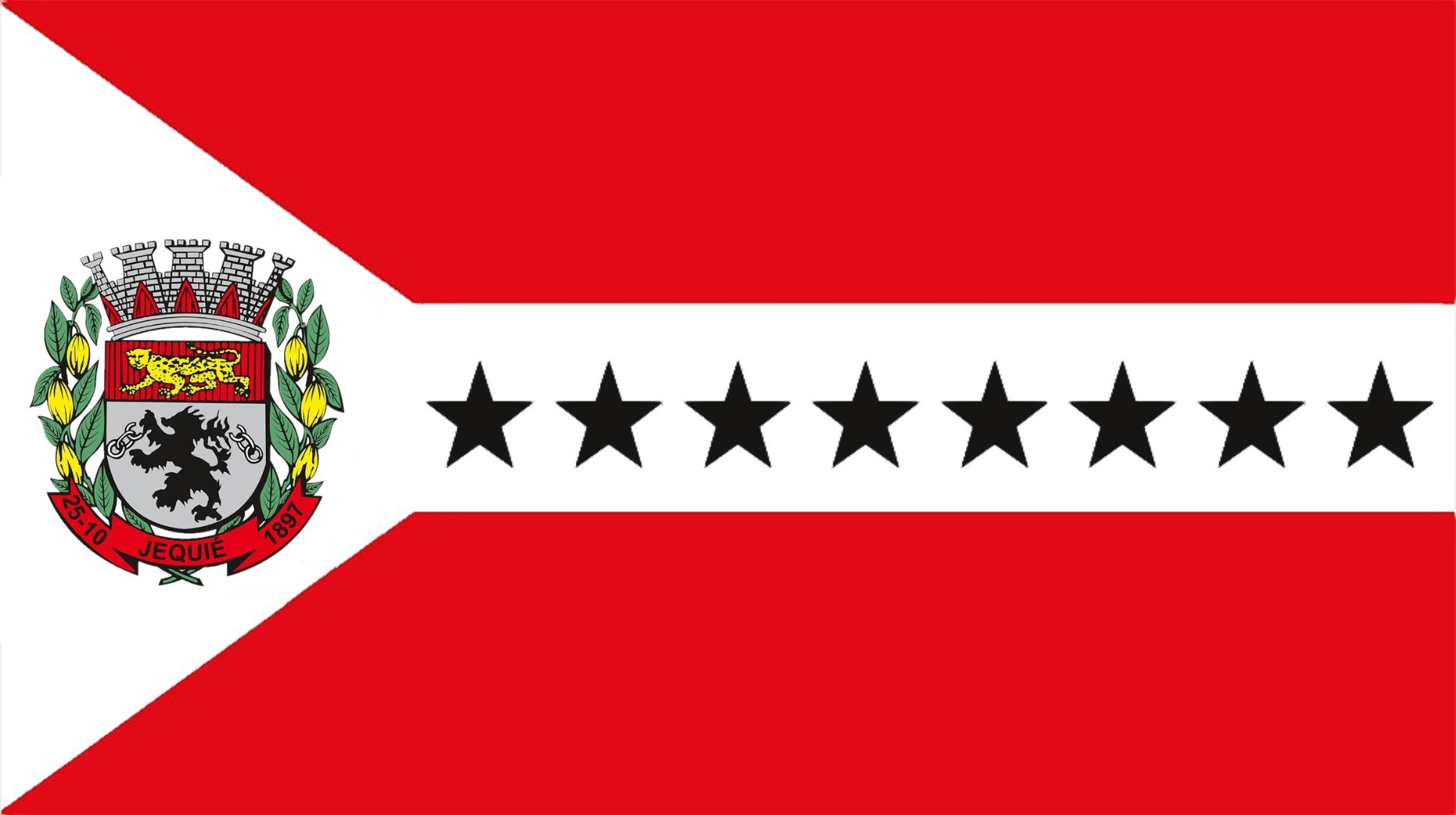
Jequié

Ji-Paraná

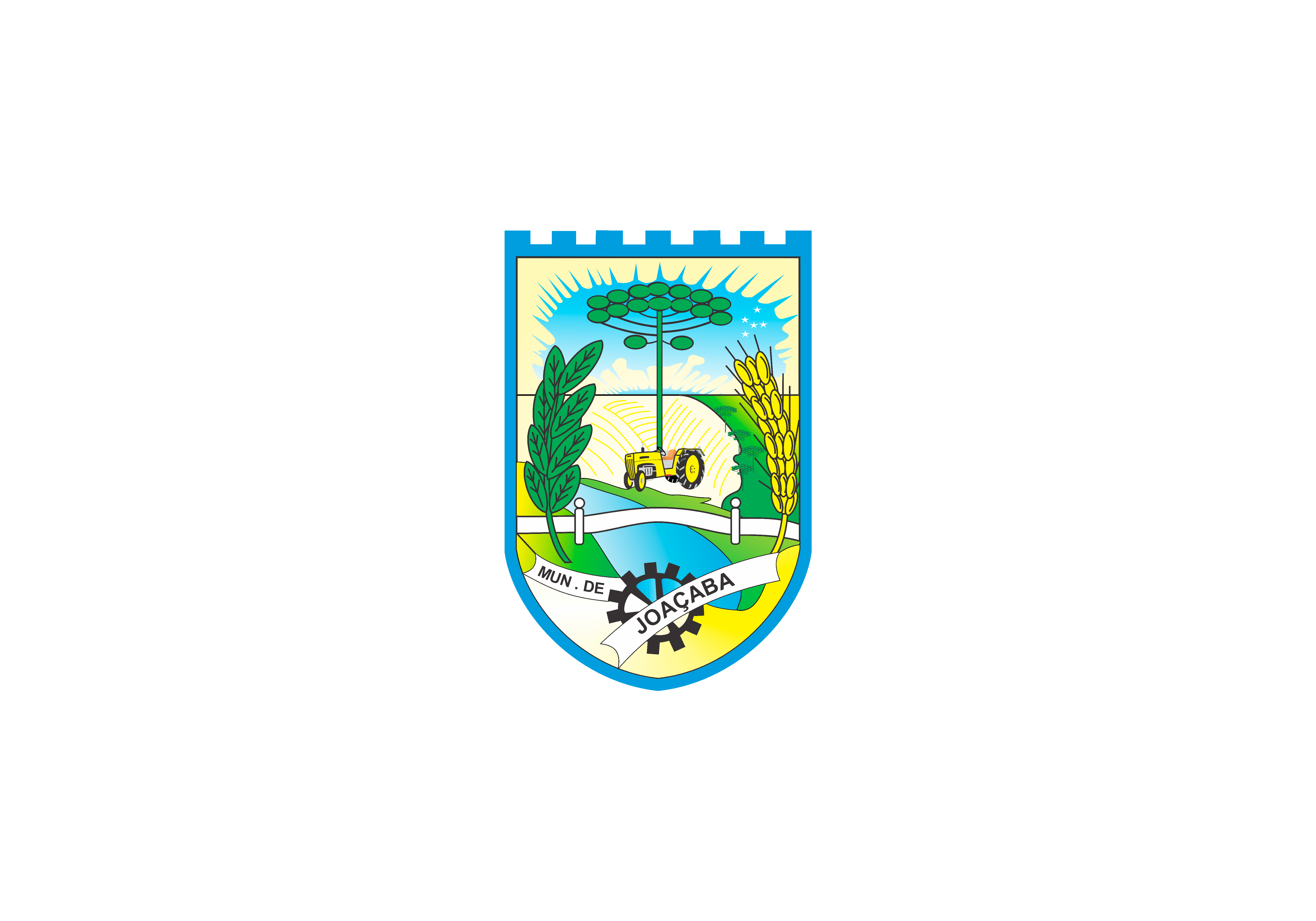
Joaçaba

João Pessoa

Joinville

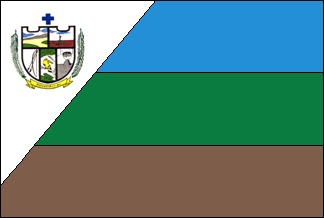
Jordão

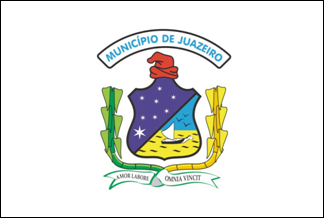
Juazeiro

Juazeiro do Norte

Juiz de Fora

Jundiaí

Jutaí

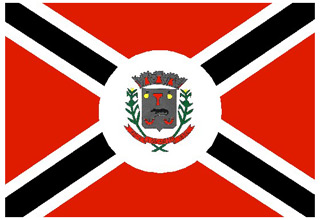
Lagarto

Lages

Laranjal do Jari

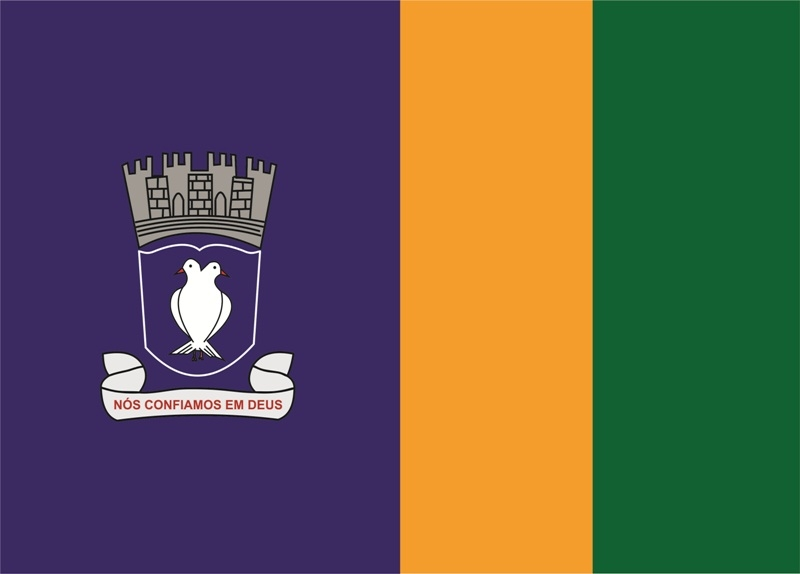
Lauro de Freitas

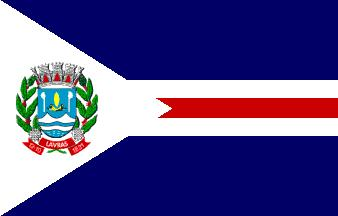
Lavras

Leme

Limeira

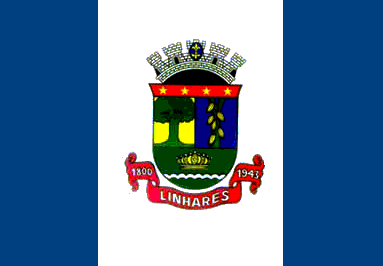
Linhares

Londrina

Lorena

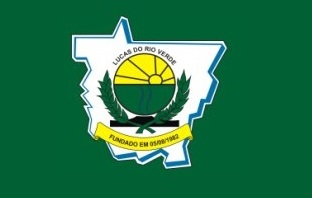
Lucas do Rio Verde

Luís Eduardo Magalhães

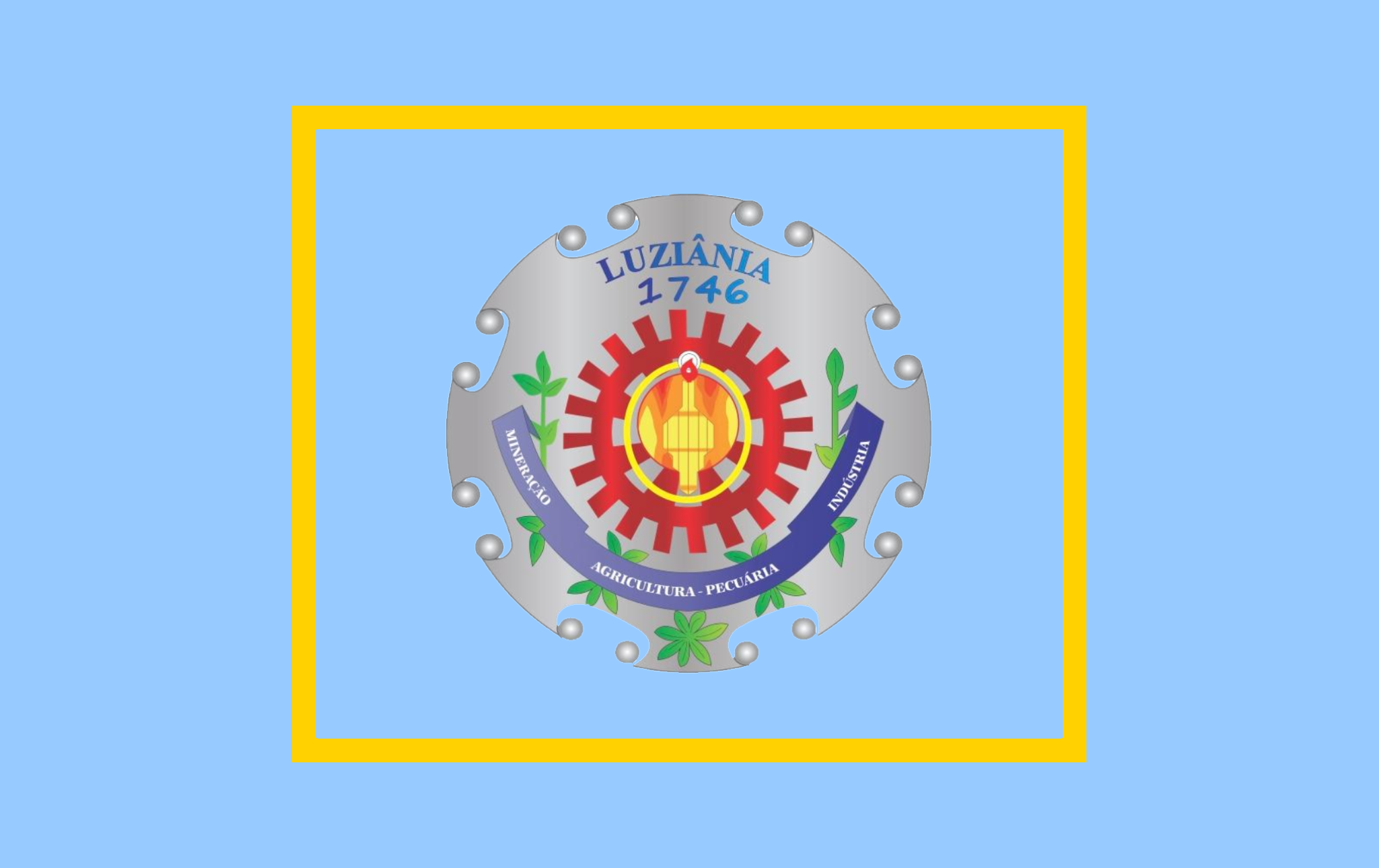
Luziânia

Macaé

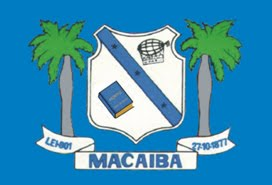
Macaíba

Macapá

Maceió

Mafra

Magé

Mairiporã

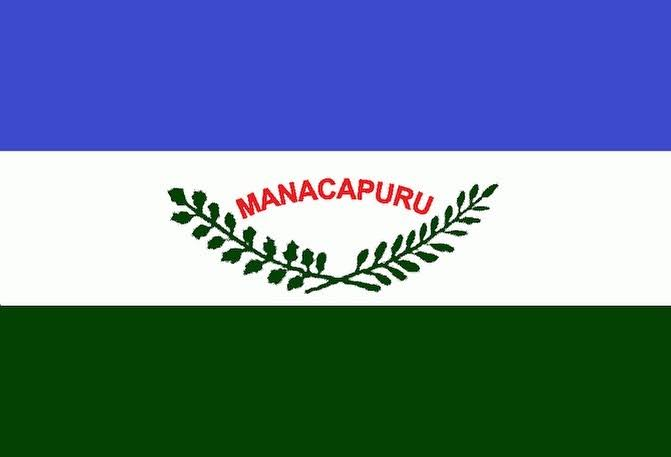
Manacapuru

Manaus

Mâncio Lima

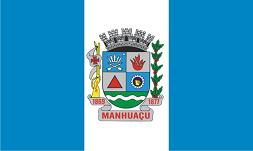
Manhuaçu

Manicoré

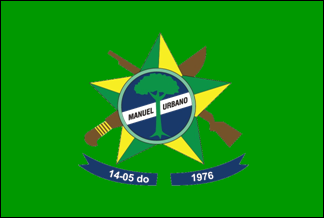
Manoel Urbano

Marabá

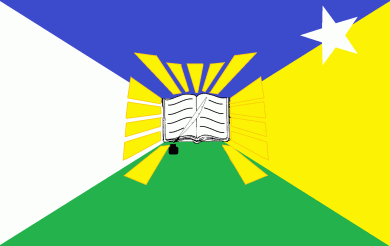
Maracaju

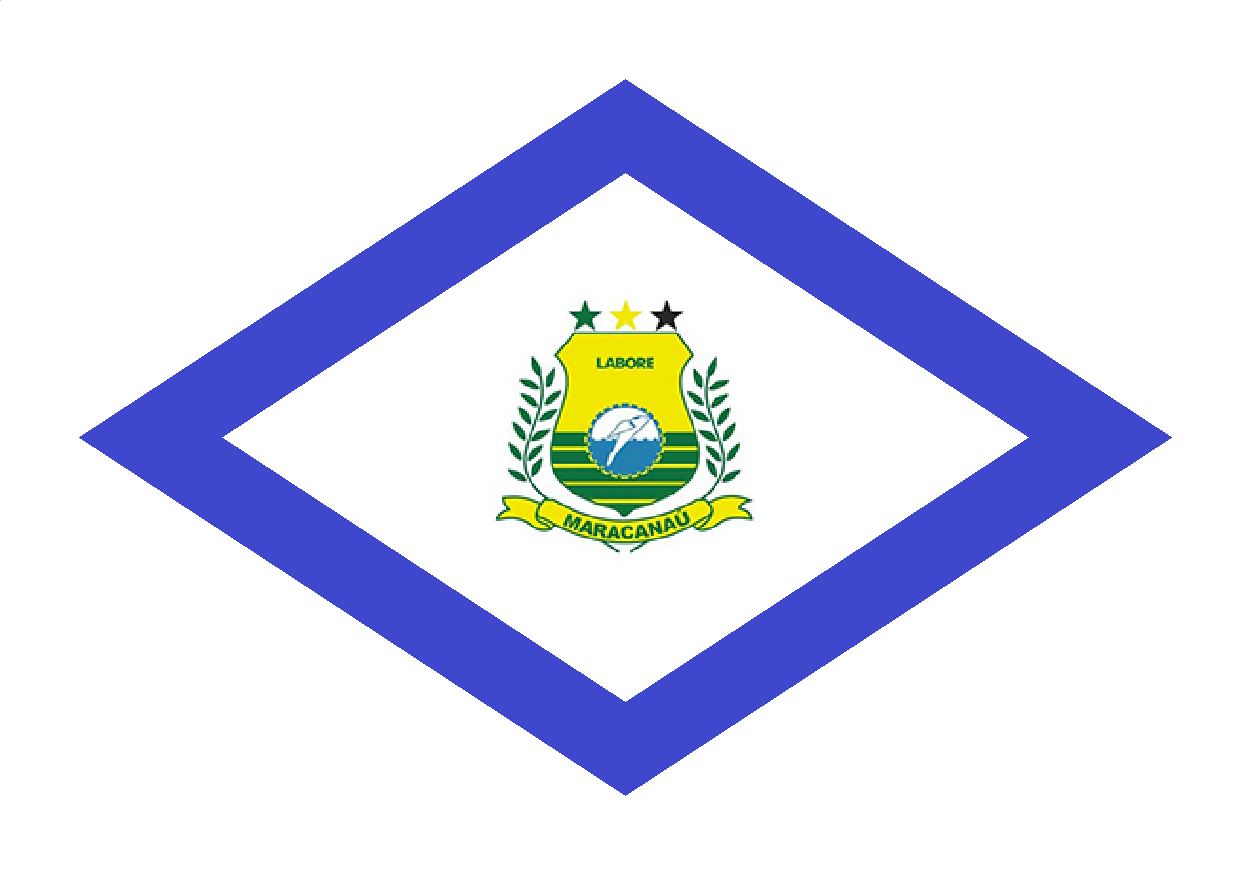
Maracanaú

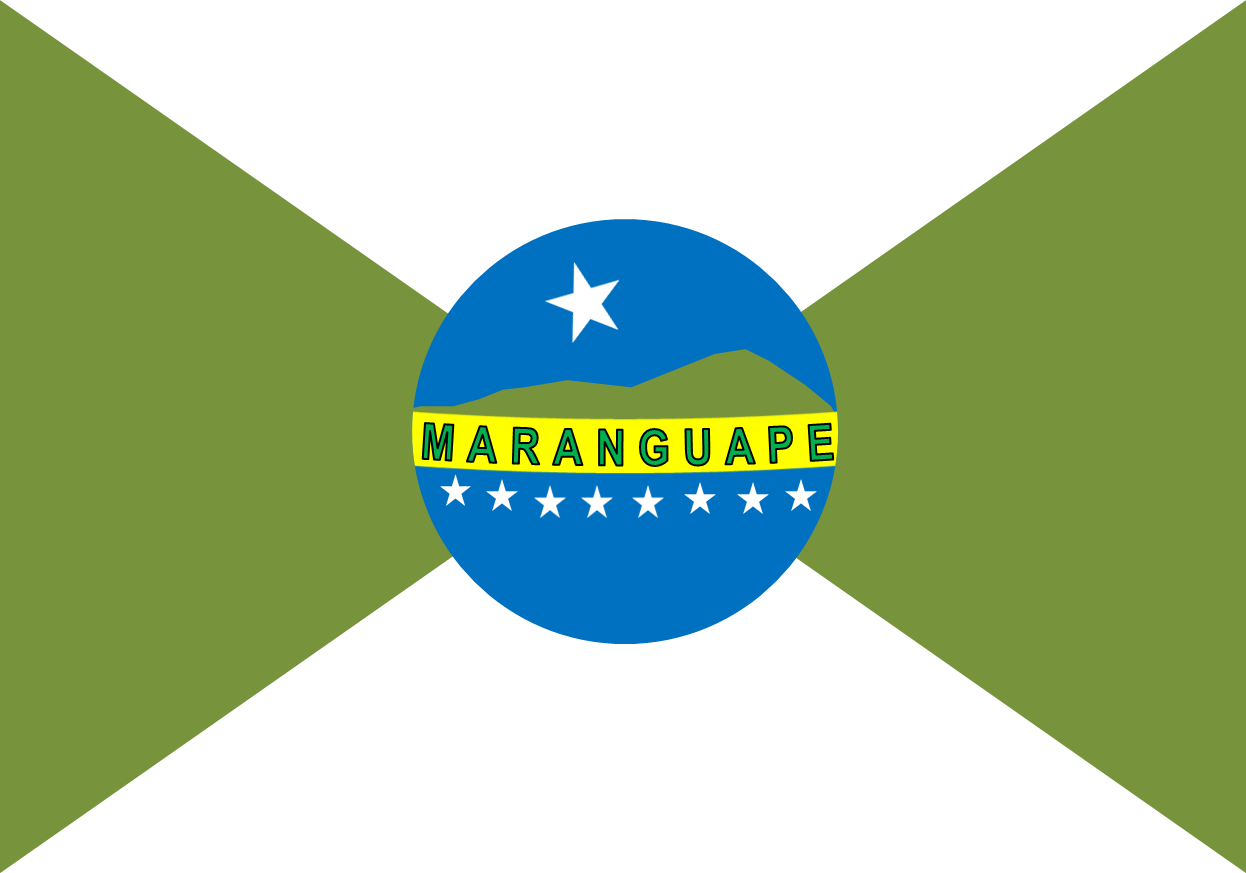
Maranguape

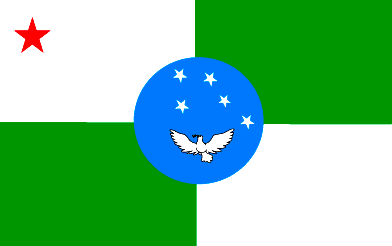
Marechal Thaumaturgo

Maricá

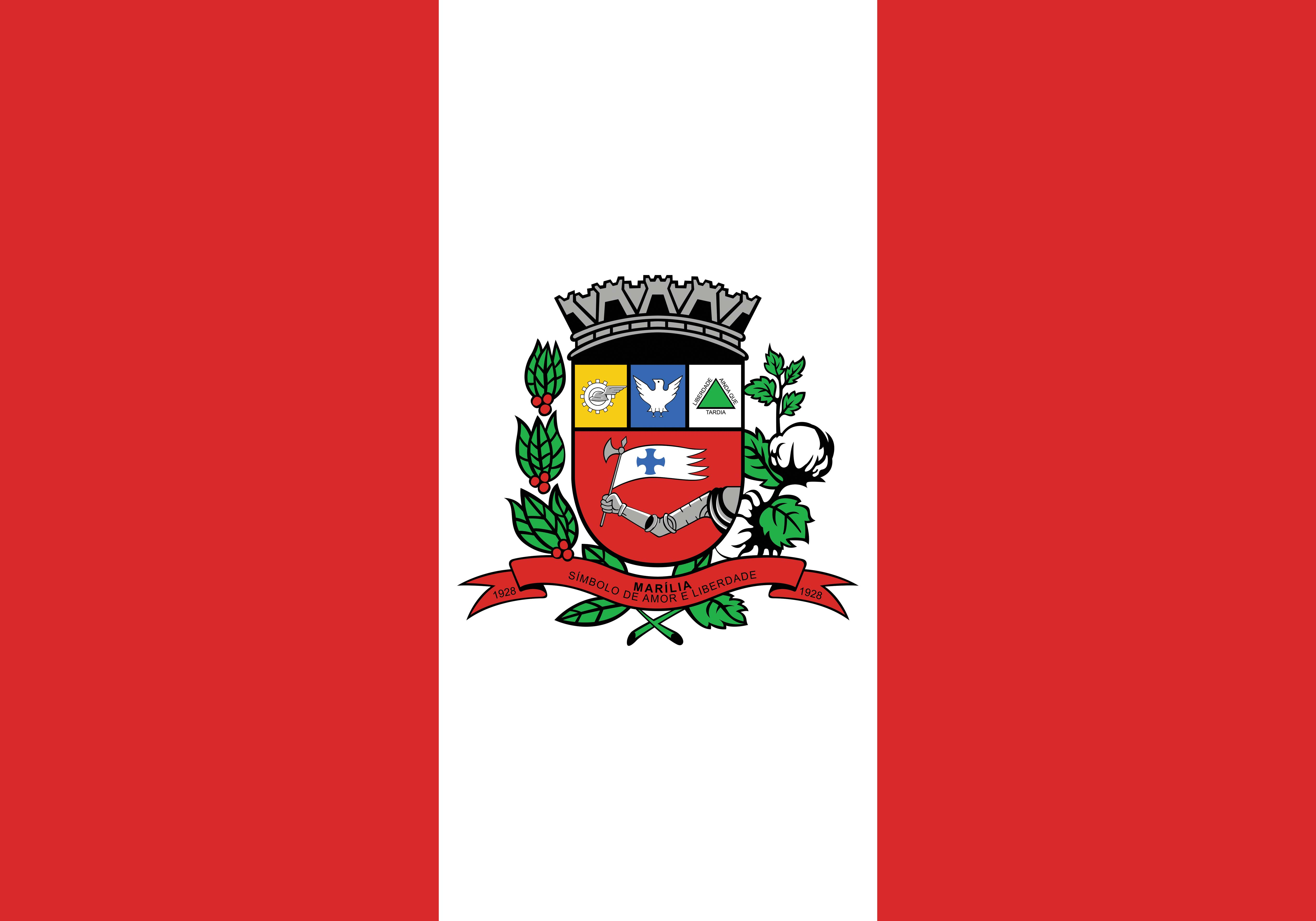
Marília

Maringá

Marituba

Mauá

Mazagão

Mesquita

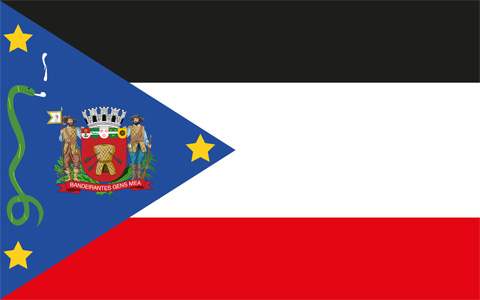
Mogi das Cruzes

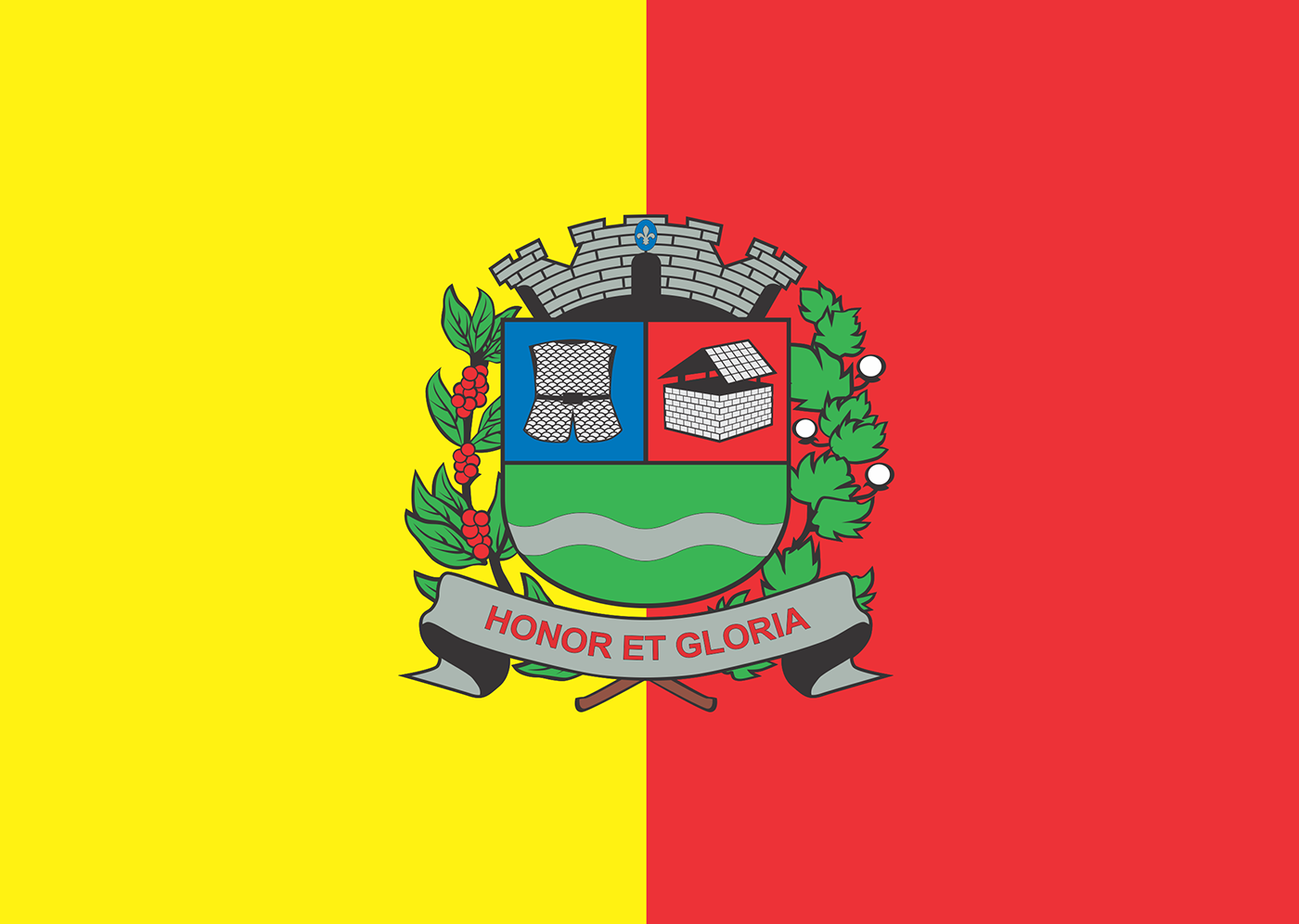
Mogi Guaçu

Mongaguá

Montes Claros

Morro Agudo

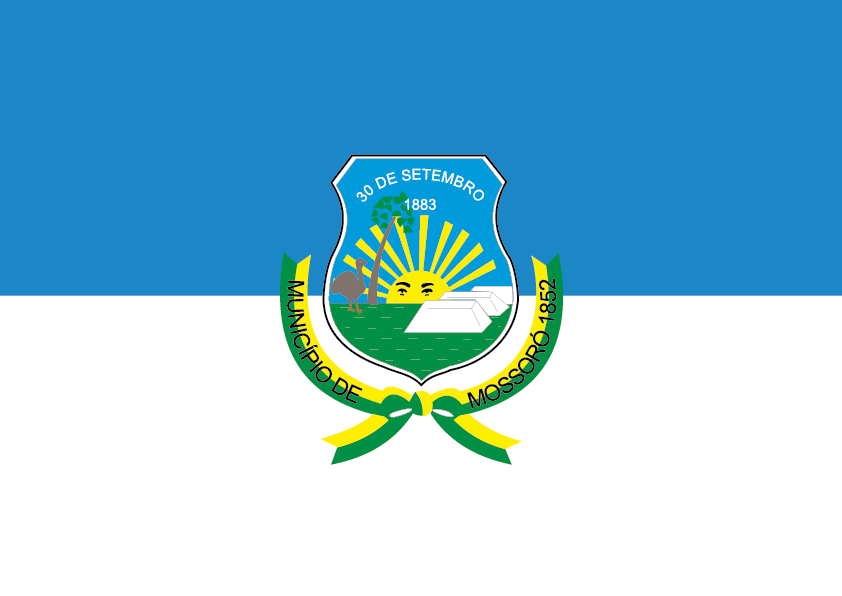
Mossoró

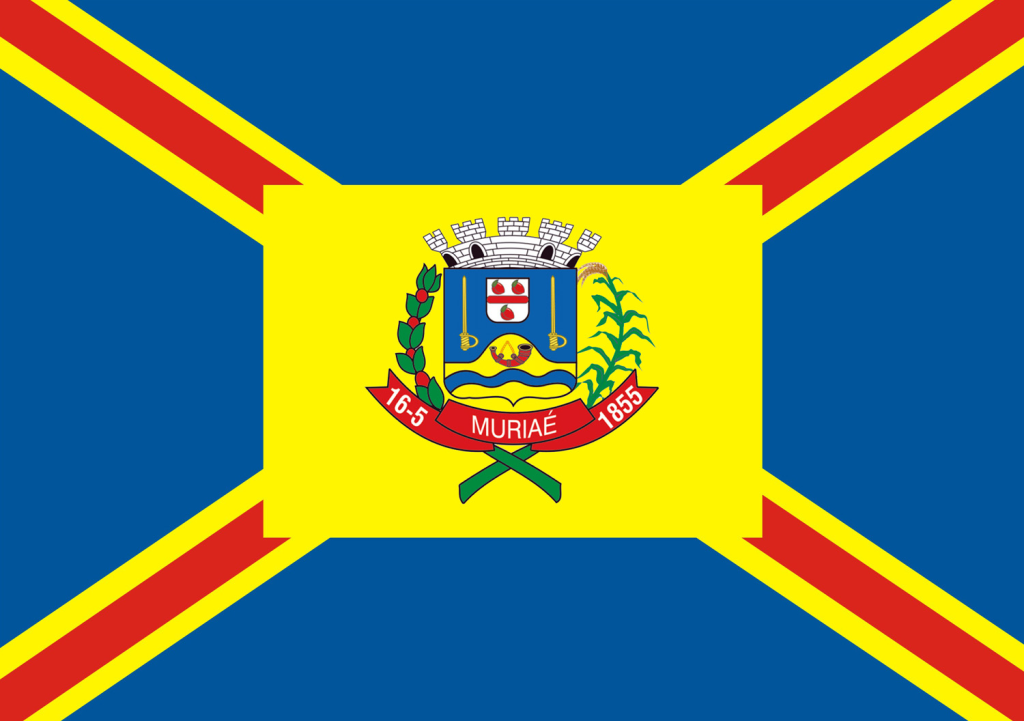
Muriaé

Natal

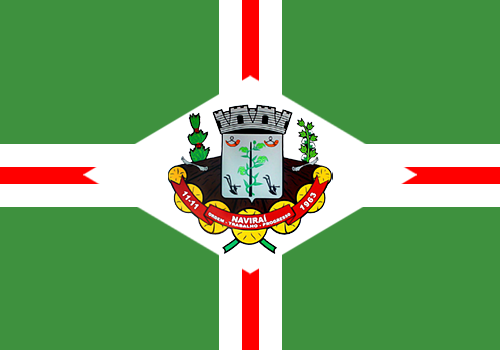
Naviraí

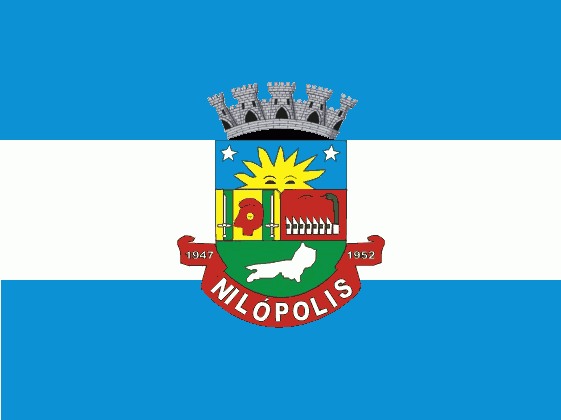
Nilópolis

Niterói

Normandia

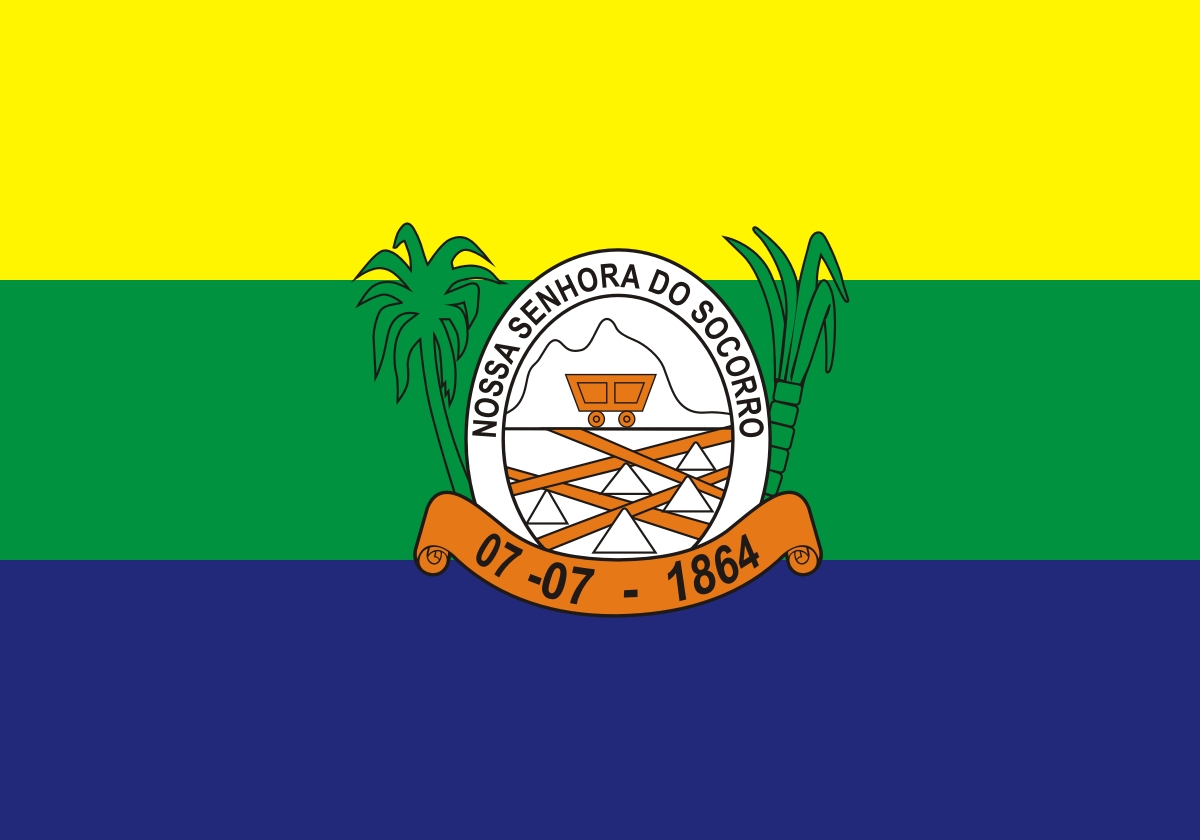
Nossa Senhora do Socorro

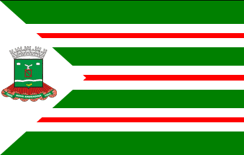
Nova Andradina

Nova Friburgo

Nova Iguaçu

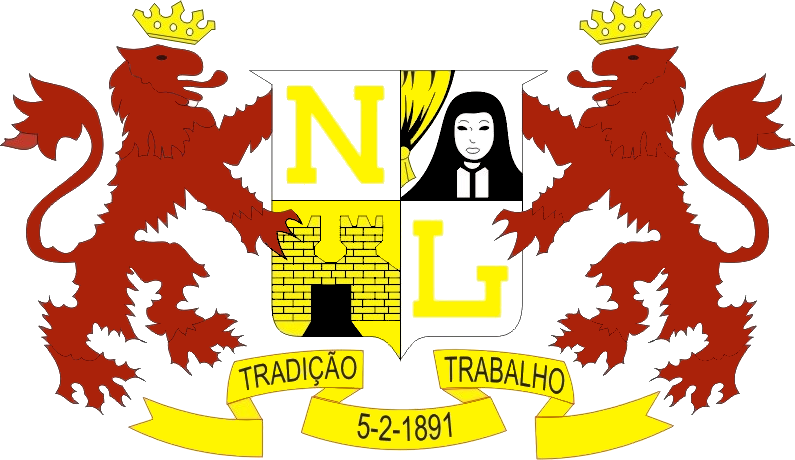
Nova Lima

Nova Olinda

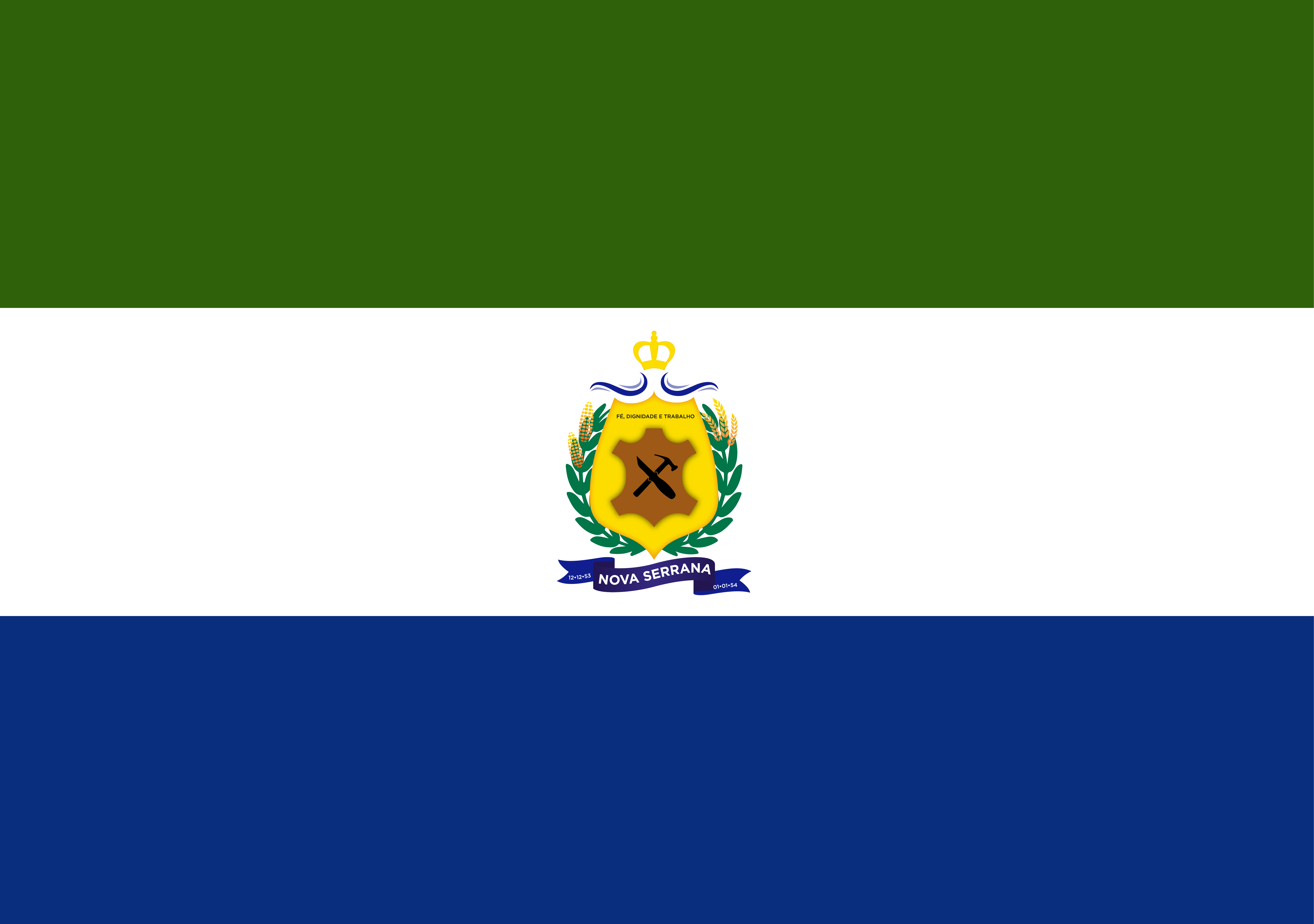
Nova Serrana

Nova Viçosa

Nova Xavantina

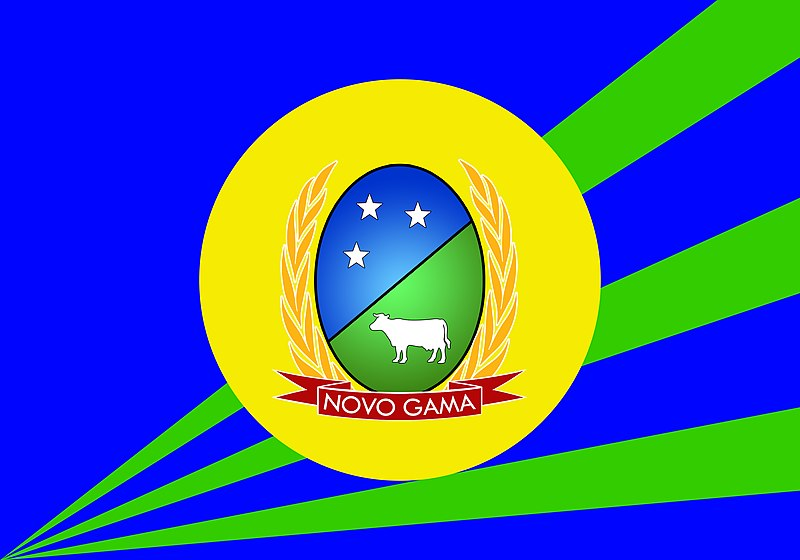
Novo Gama

Novo Hamburgo

Oiapoque

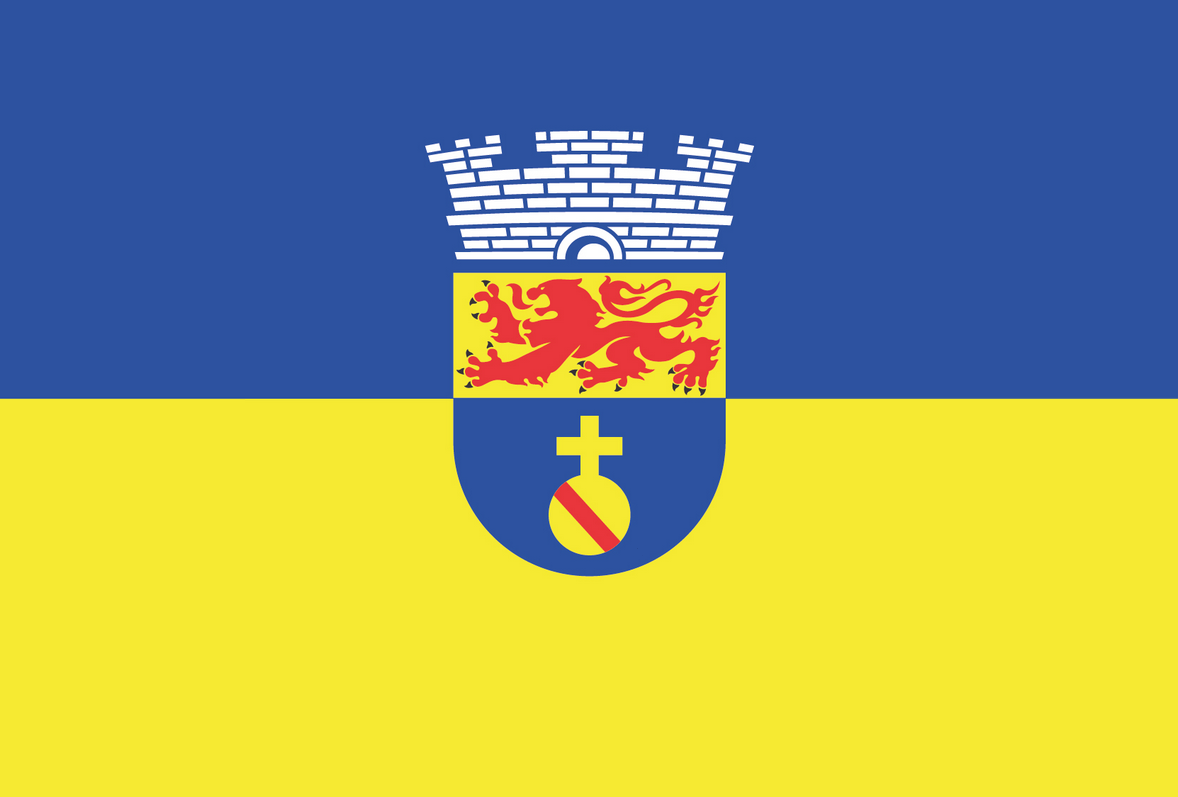
Olinda

Osasco

Ourinhos

Ouro Preto

Pacaraima

Pacatuba

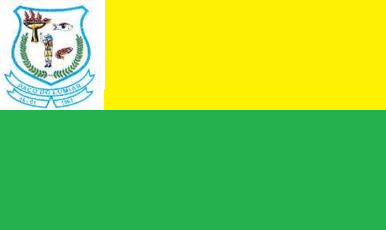
Paço do Lumiar

Palhoça

Palmas

Palmeira dos Índios

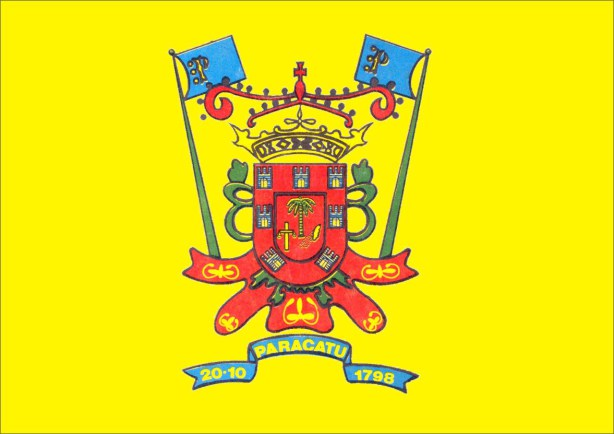
Paracatu

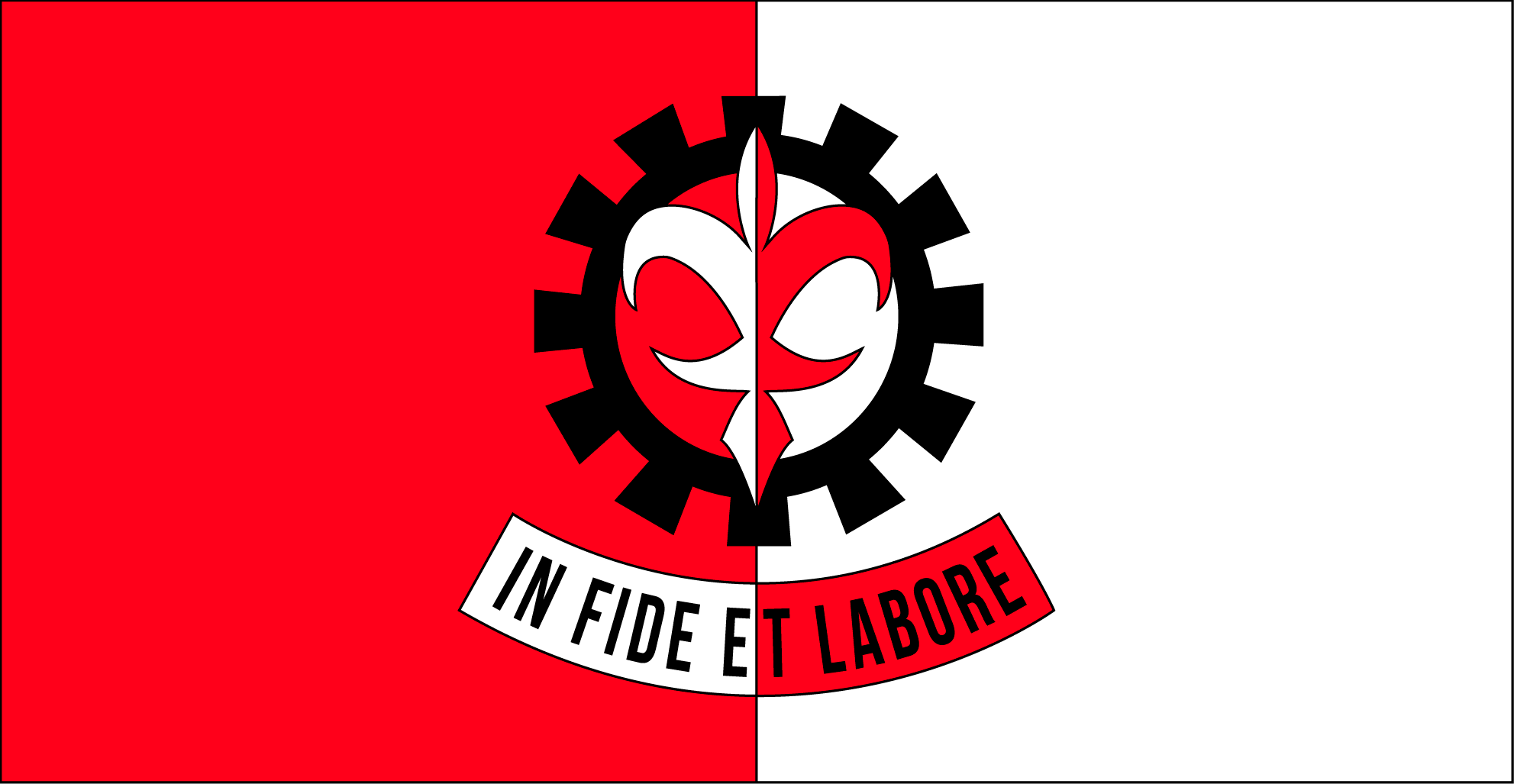
Pará de Minas

Paragominas

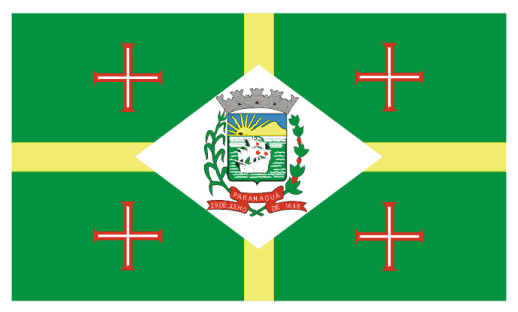
Paranaguá

Parauapebas

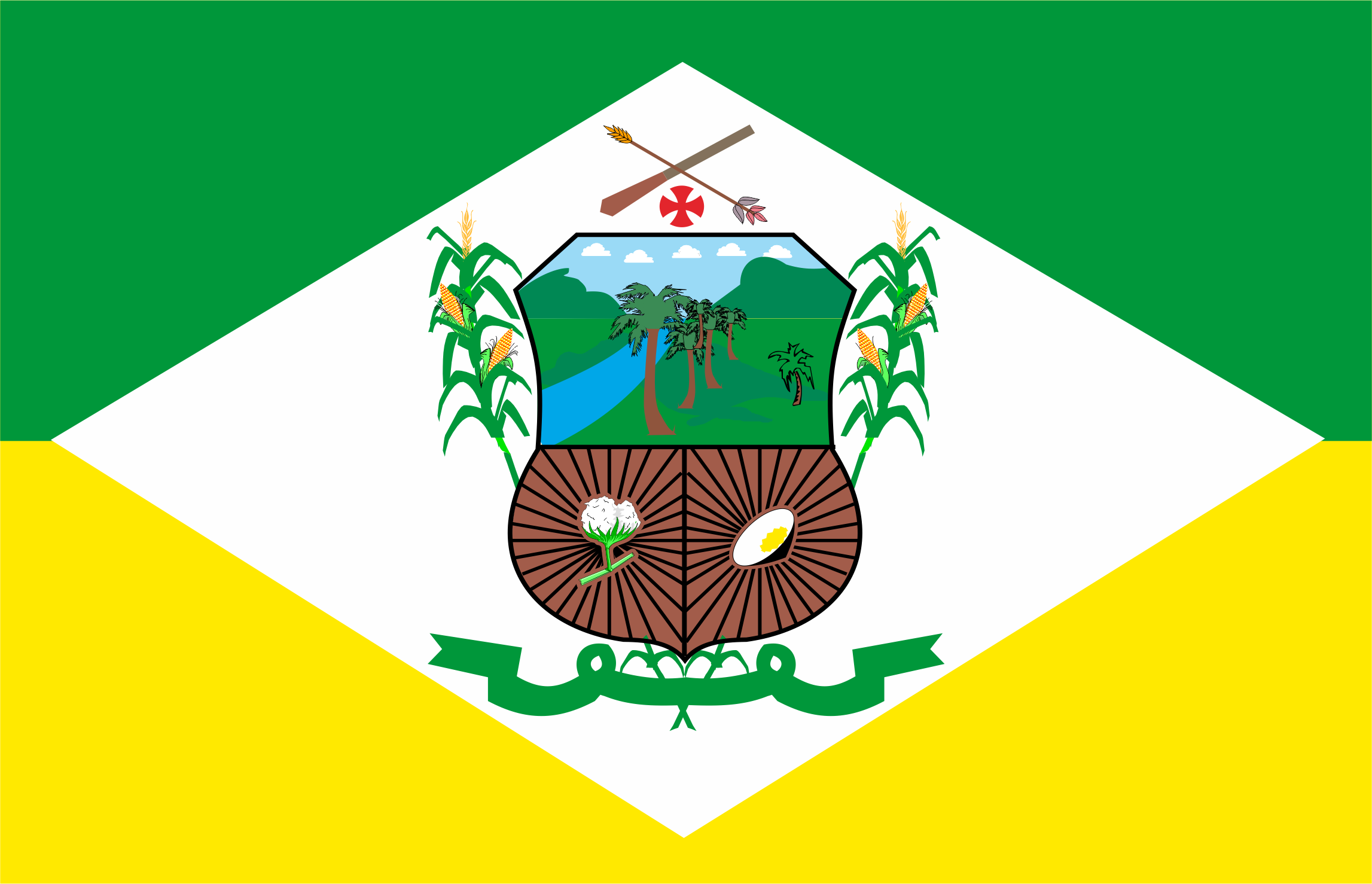
Parelhas

Parintins

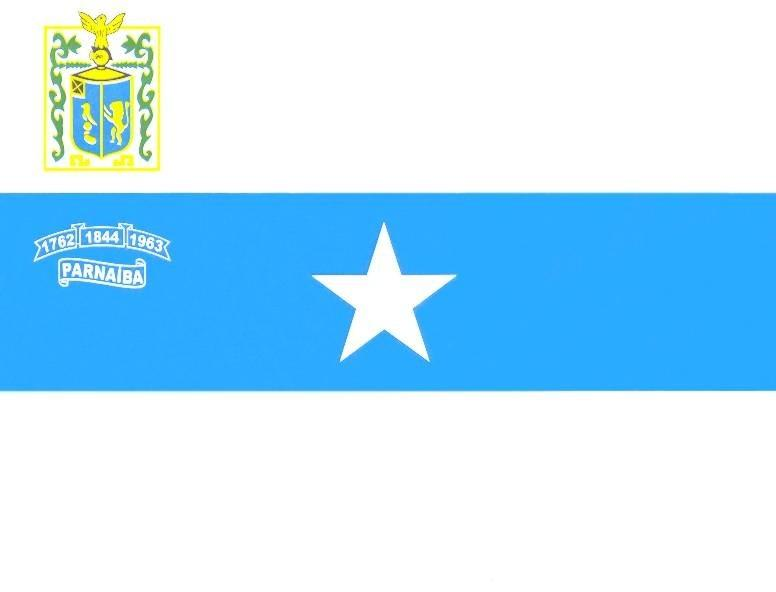
Parnaíba

Parnamirim

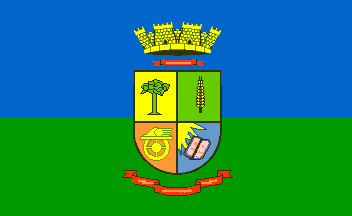
Passo Fundo

Passos

Patos

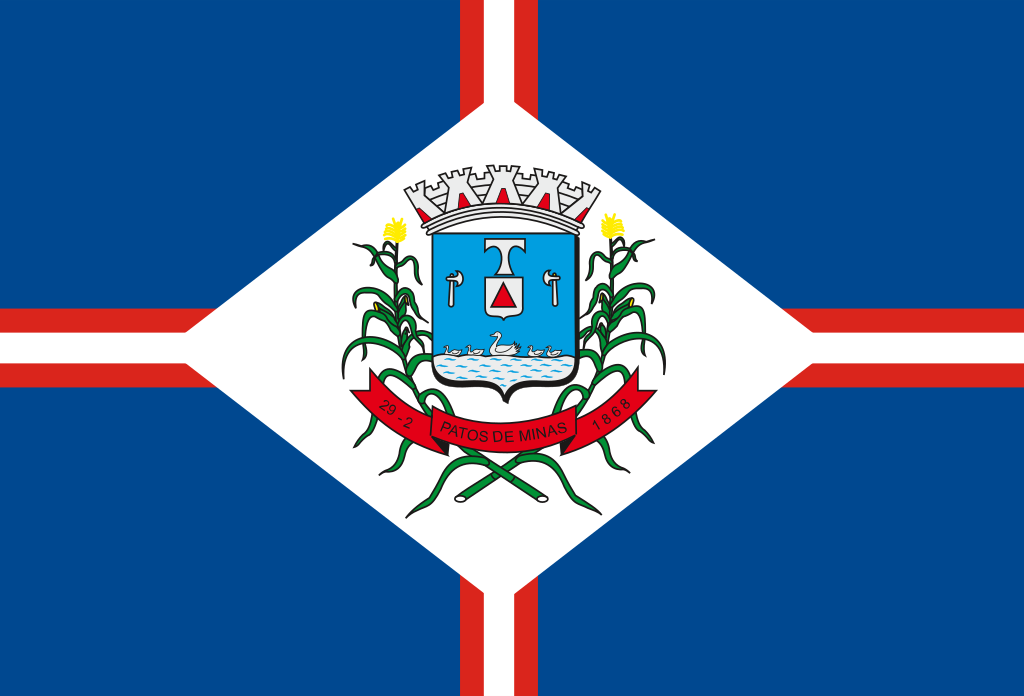
Patos de Minas

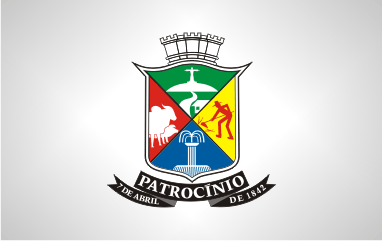
Patrocínio

Paulínia

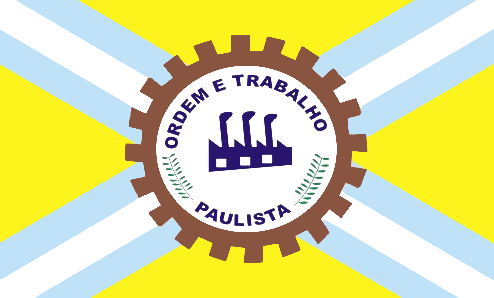
Paulista

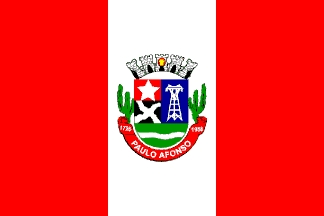
Paulo Afonso

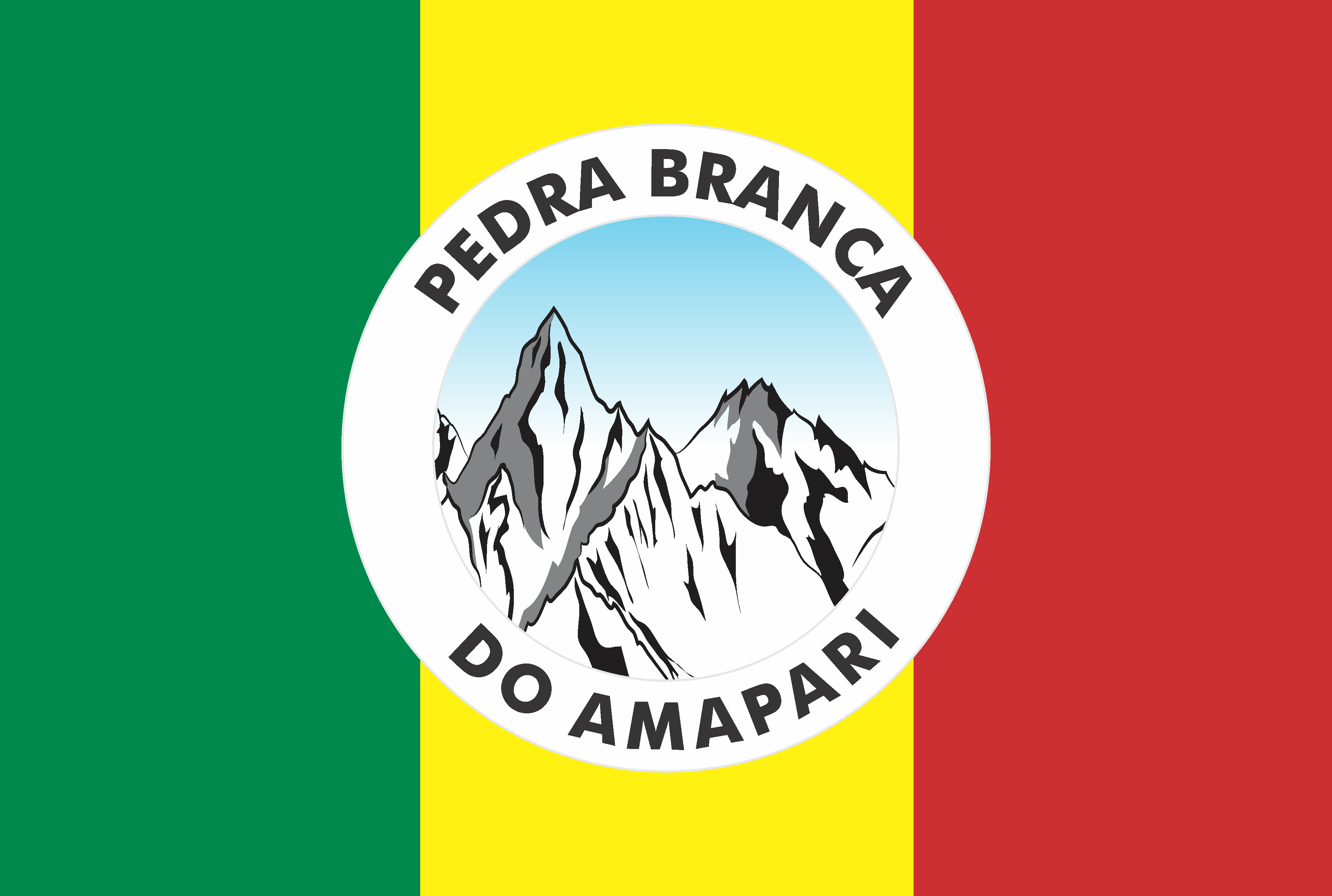
Pedra Branca do Amapari

Pedra Preta

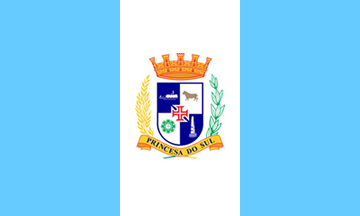
Pelotas

Penedo

Peruíbe

Petrolina

Petrópolis

Picos

Pindamonhangaba

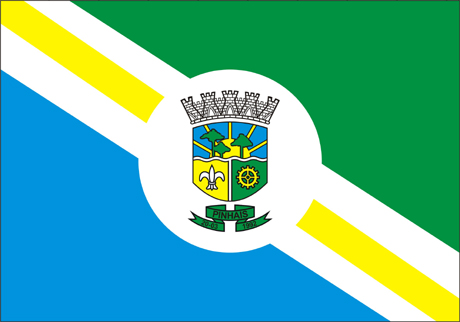
Pinhais

Pinheiro

Piracicaba

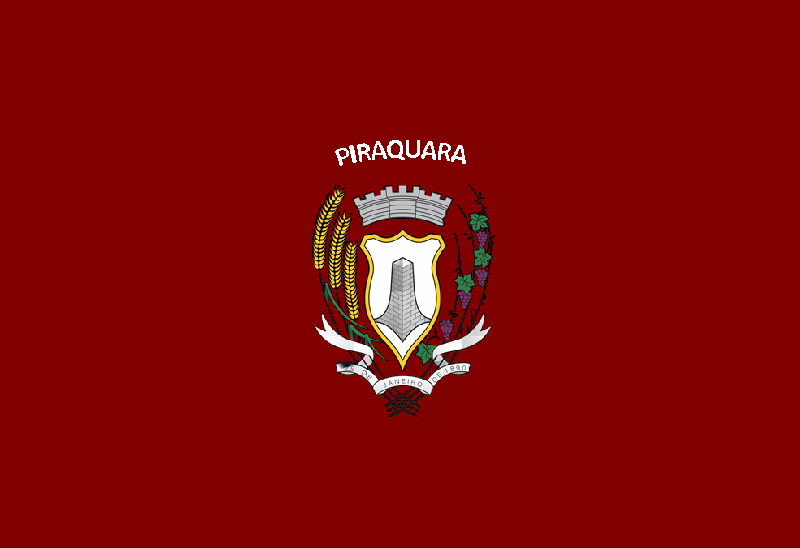
Piraquara

Plácido de Castro

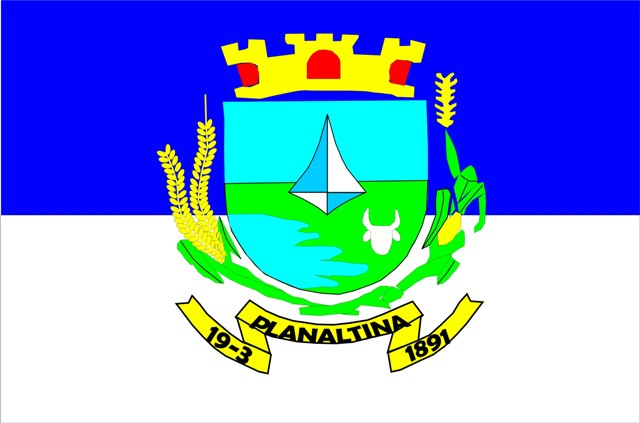
Planaltina

Poá

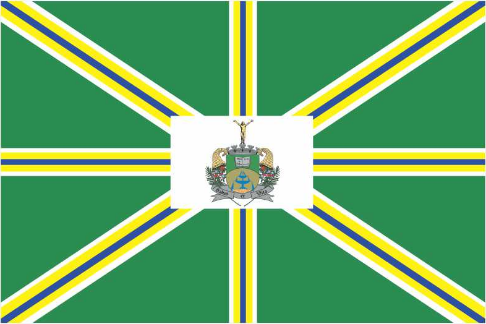
Poços de Caldas

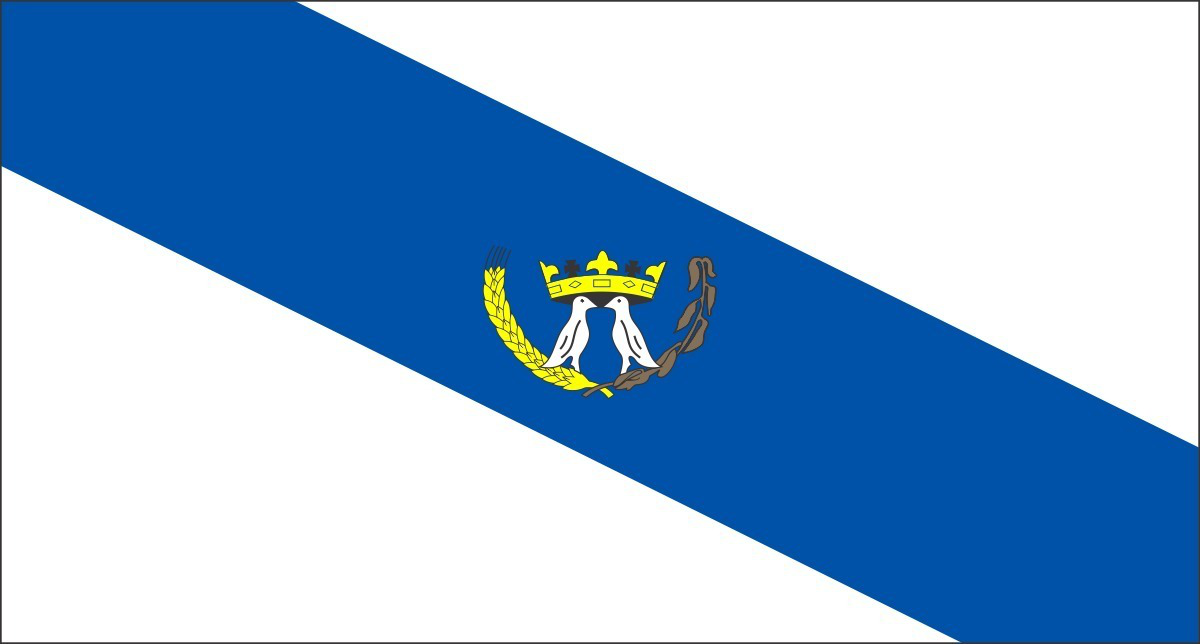
Ponta Grossa

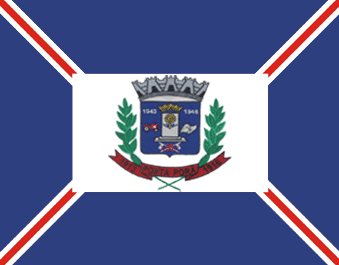
Ponta Porã

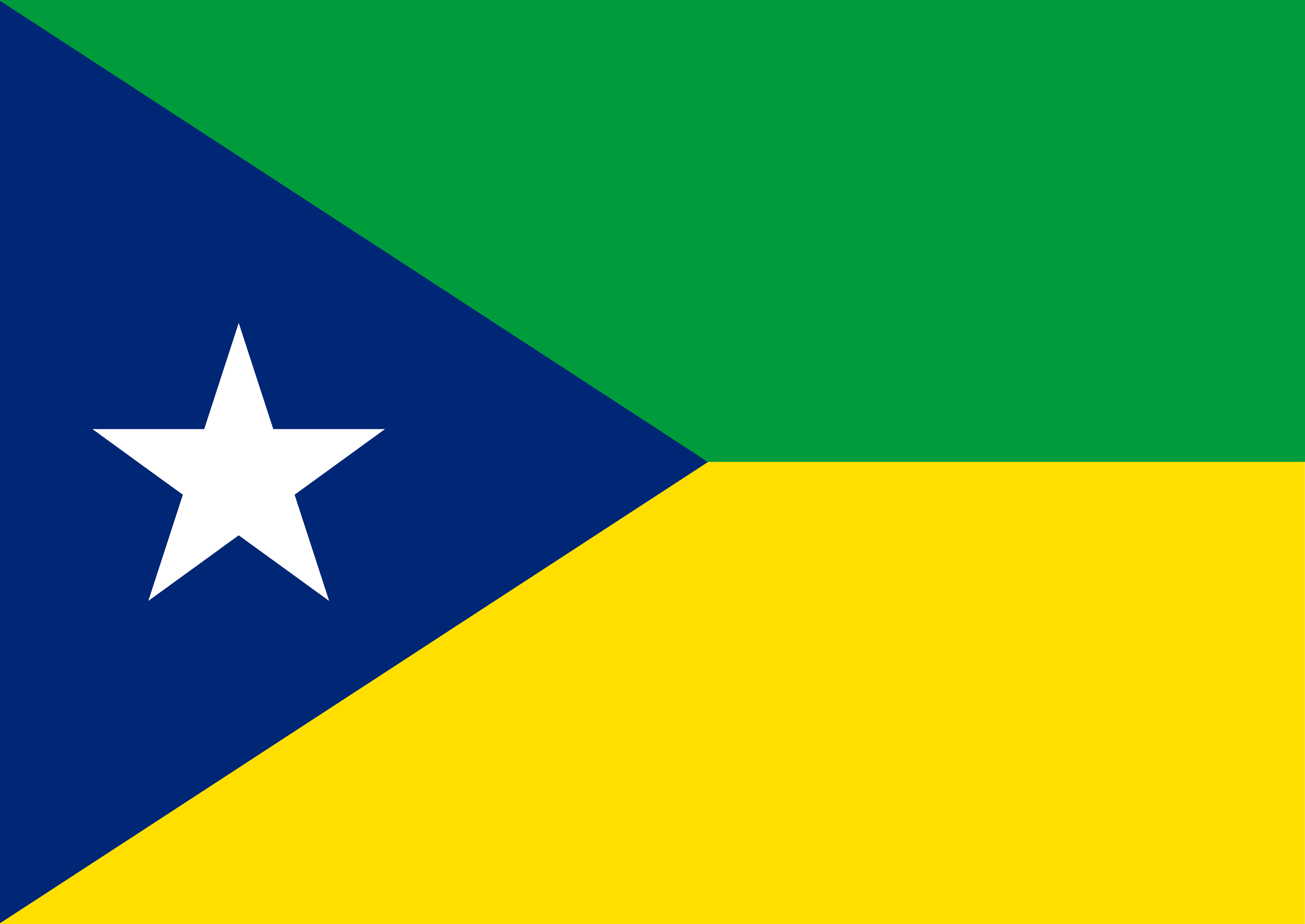
Pontes e Lacerda

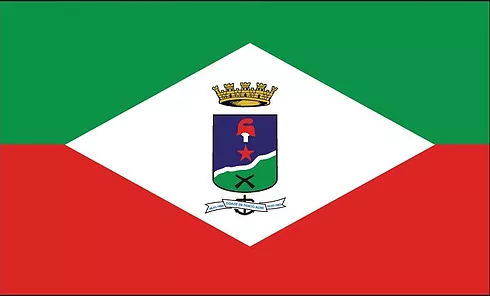
Porto Acre

Porto Alegre

Porto Grande

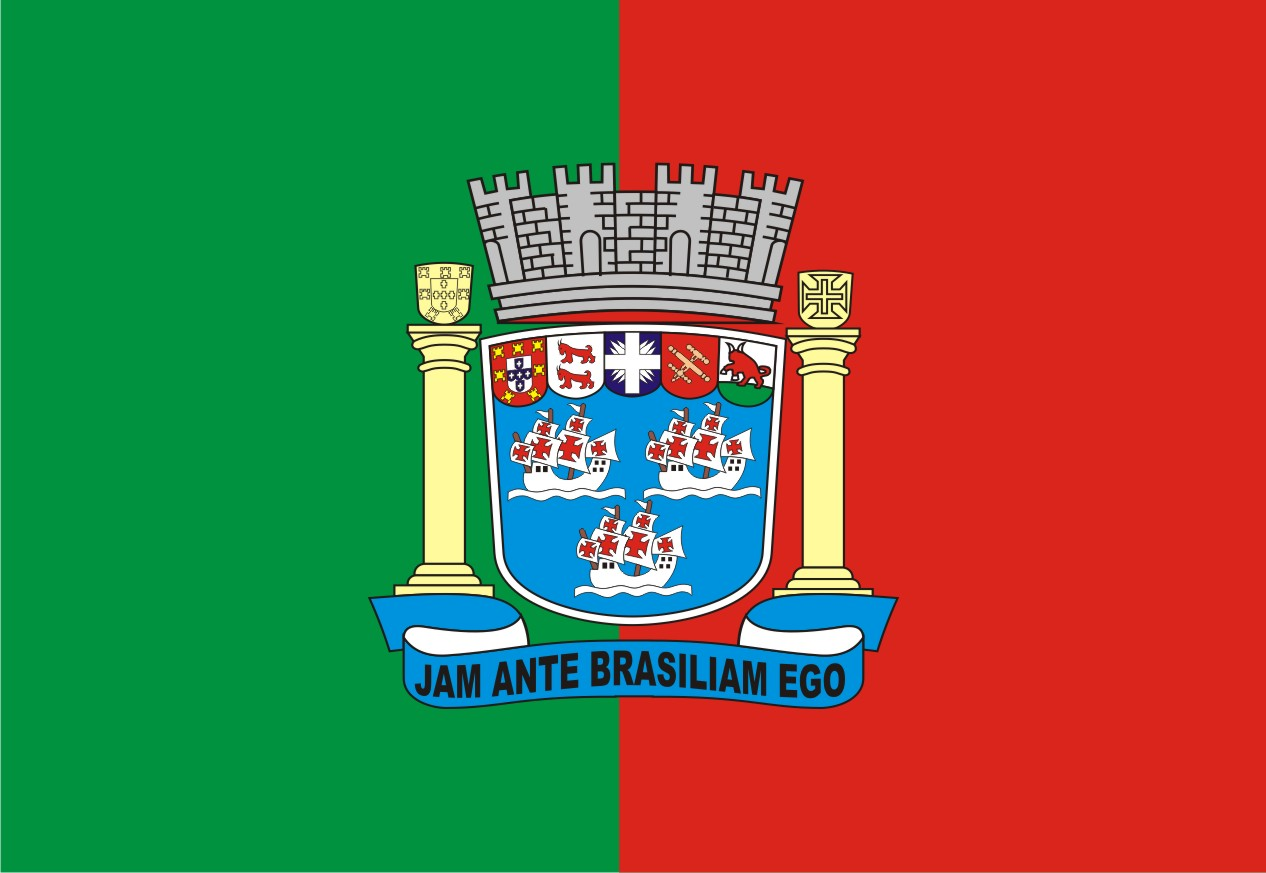
Porto Seguro

Porto Velho

Porto Walter

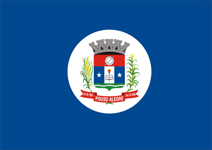
Pouso Alegre

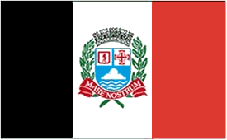
Praia Grande

Presidente Prudente

Quaraí

Queimados

Quixadá

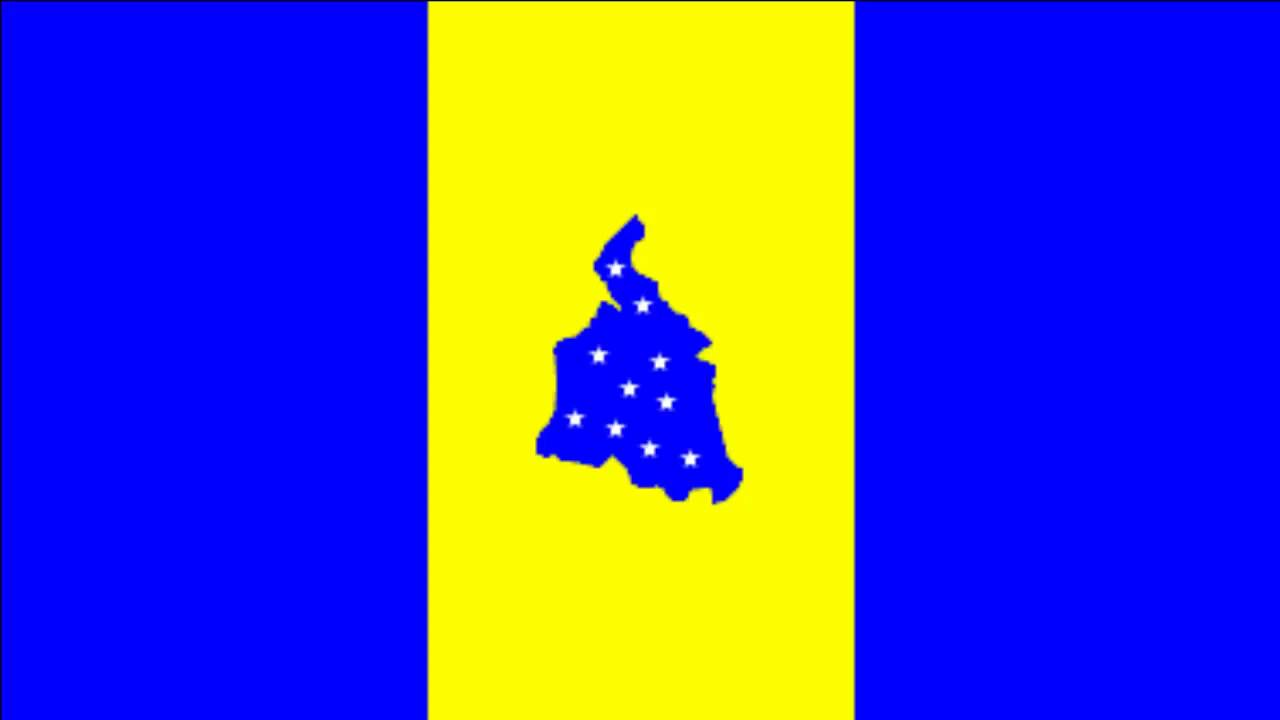
Quixeramobim

Recife

Redenção

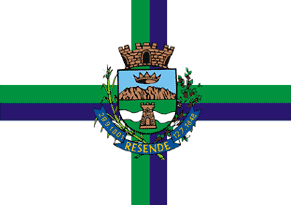
Resende

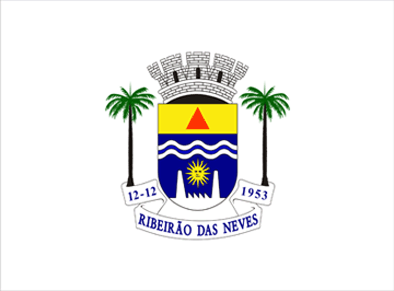
Ribeirão das Neves

Ribeirão Pires

Ribeirão Preto

Rio Branco

Rio Claro

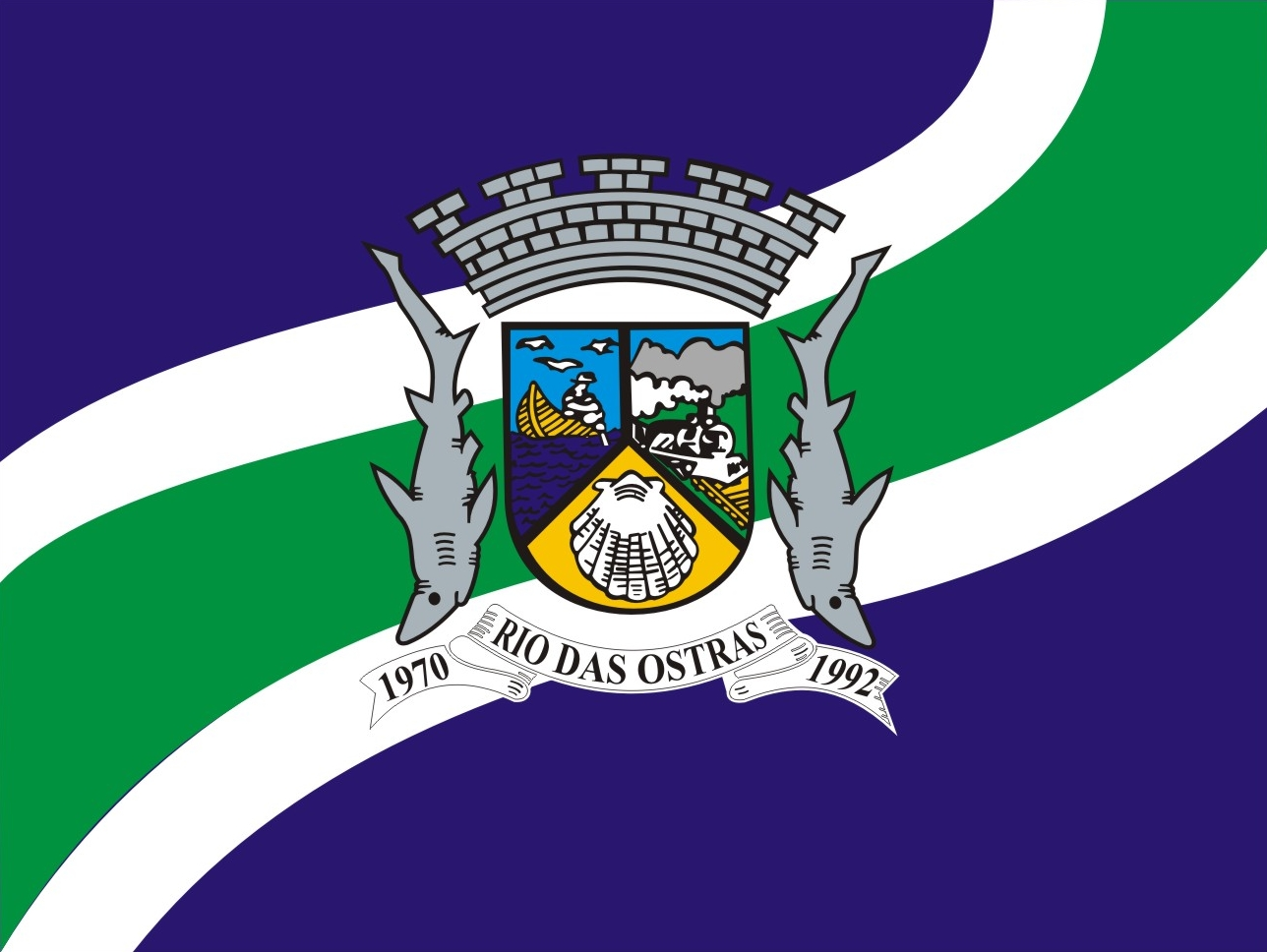
Rio das Ostras

Rio de Janeiro (details)

Rio do Sul

Rio Grande

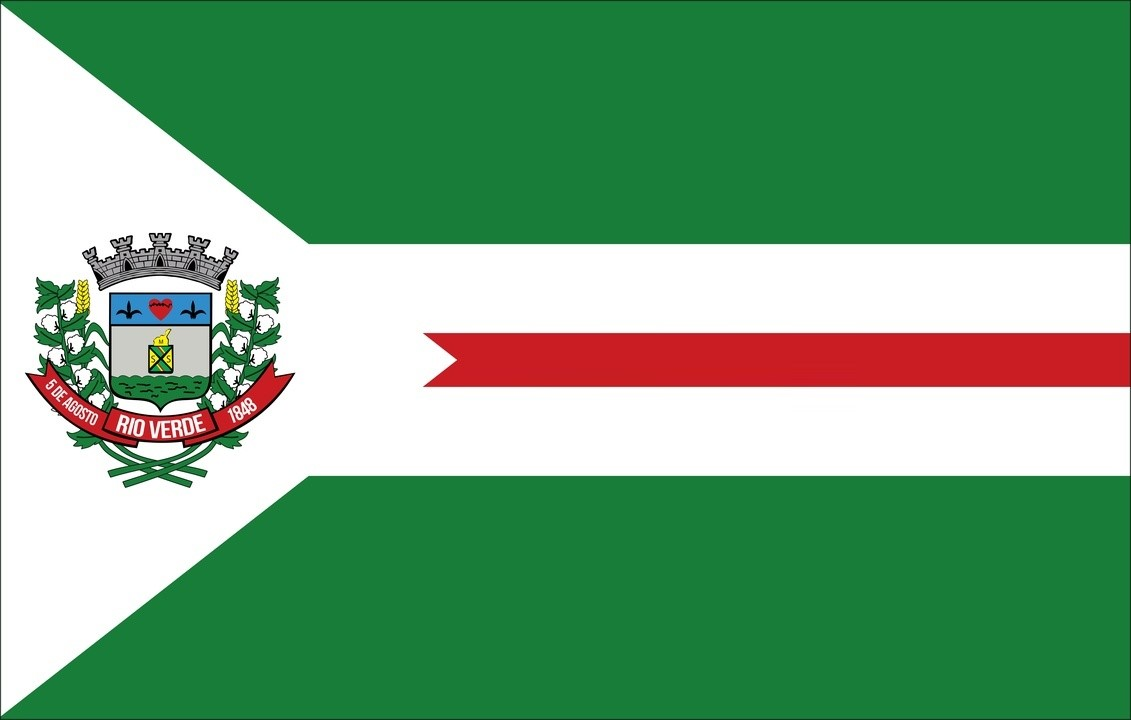
Rio Verde

Rodrigues Alves

Rolim de Moura

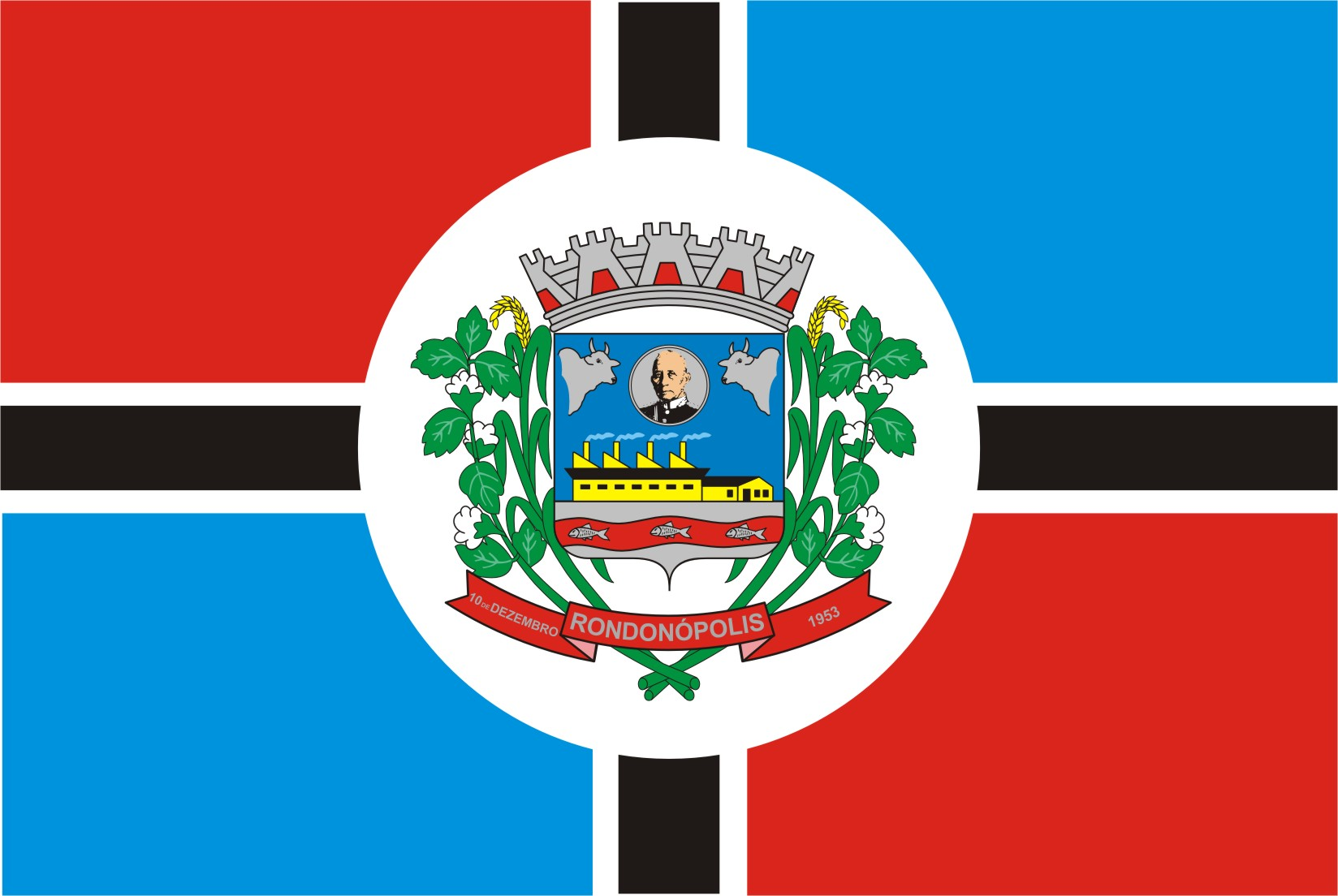
Rondonópolis

Rorainópolis

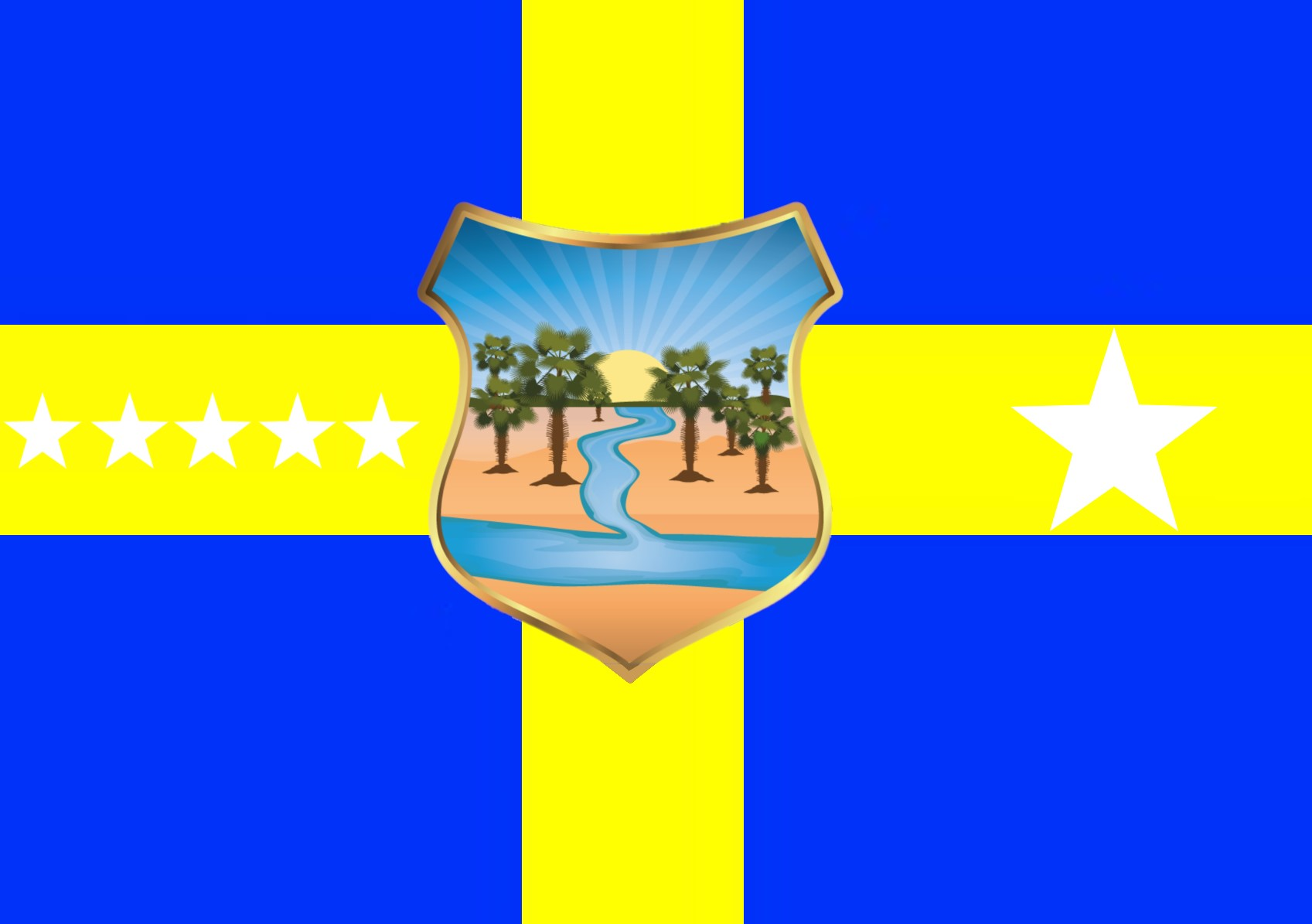
Russas

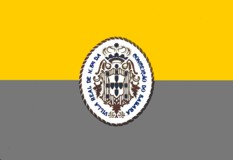
Sabará

Salesópolis

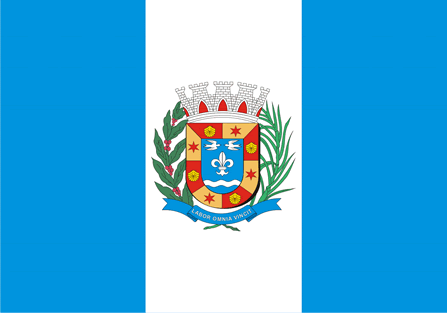
Salto

Salvador

Santa Bárbara d'Oeste

Santa Cruz do Capibaribe

Santa Cruz do Sul

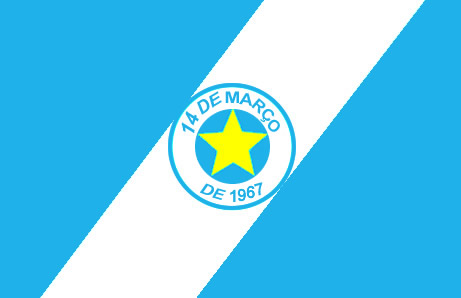
Santa Inês

Santa Izabel do Oeste

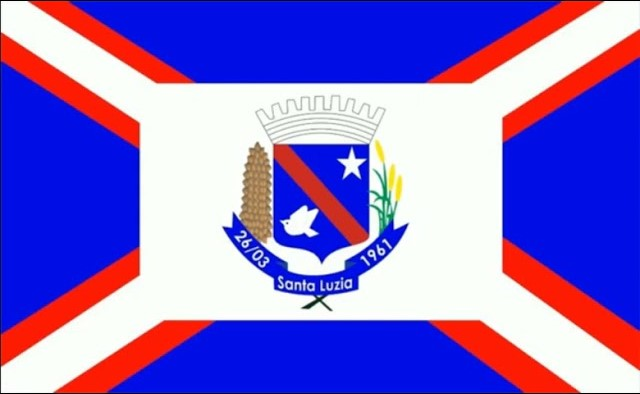
Santa Luzia, Maranhão

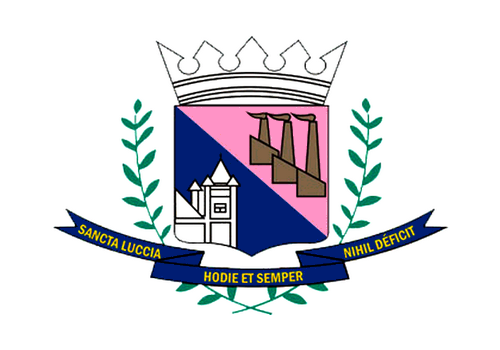
Santa Luzia, Minas Gerais

Santa Luzia, Paraíba

Santa Maria

Santana

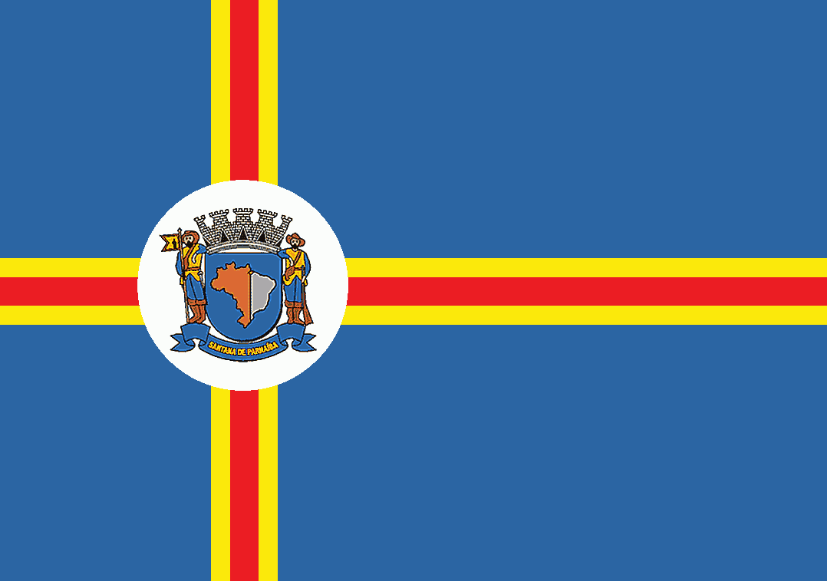
Santana de Parnaíba

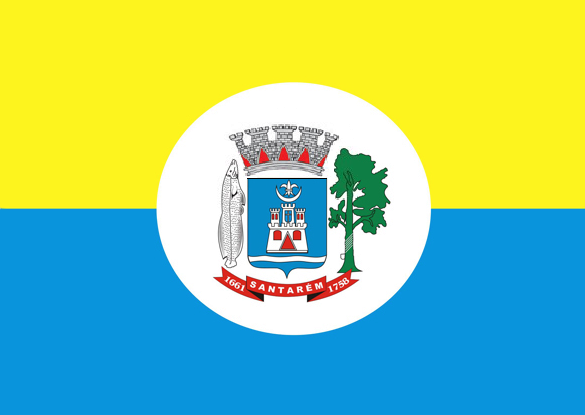
Santarém

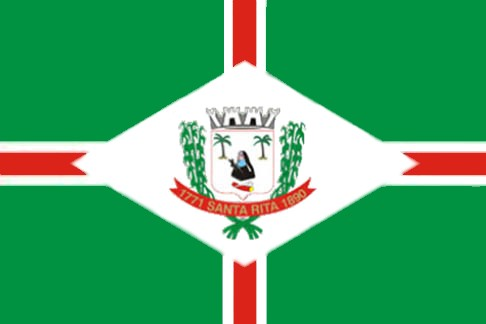
Santa Rita

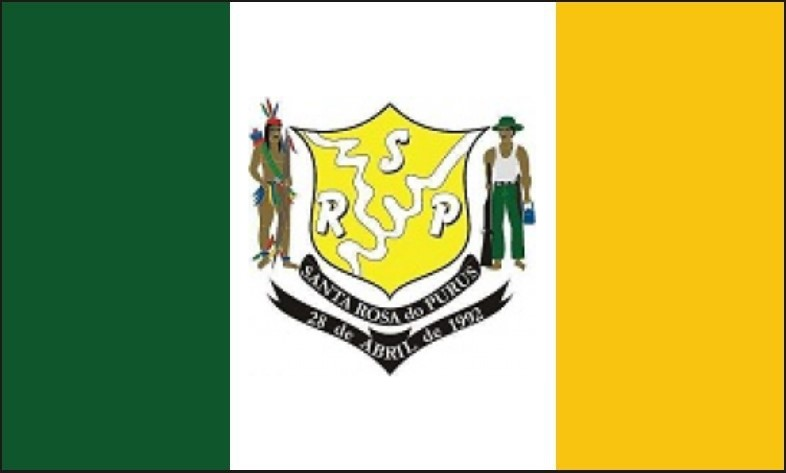
Santa Rosa do Purus

Santo André

Santo Antônio de Jesus

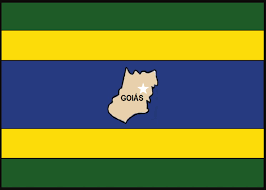
Santo Antônio do Descoberto

Santos

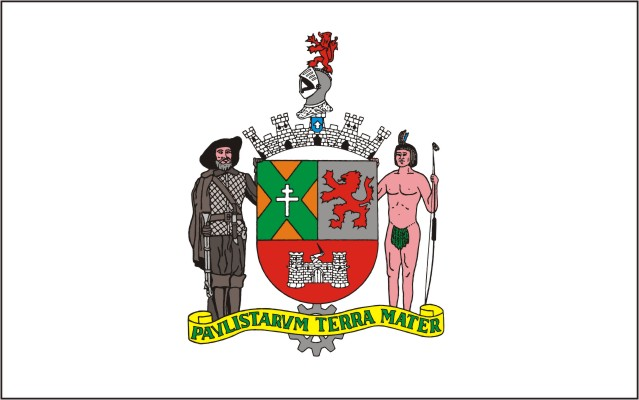
São Bernardo do Campo

São Caetano do Sul

São Carlos

São Cristóvão

São Félix do Xingu

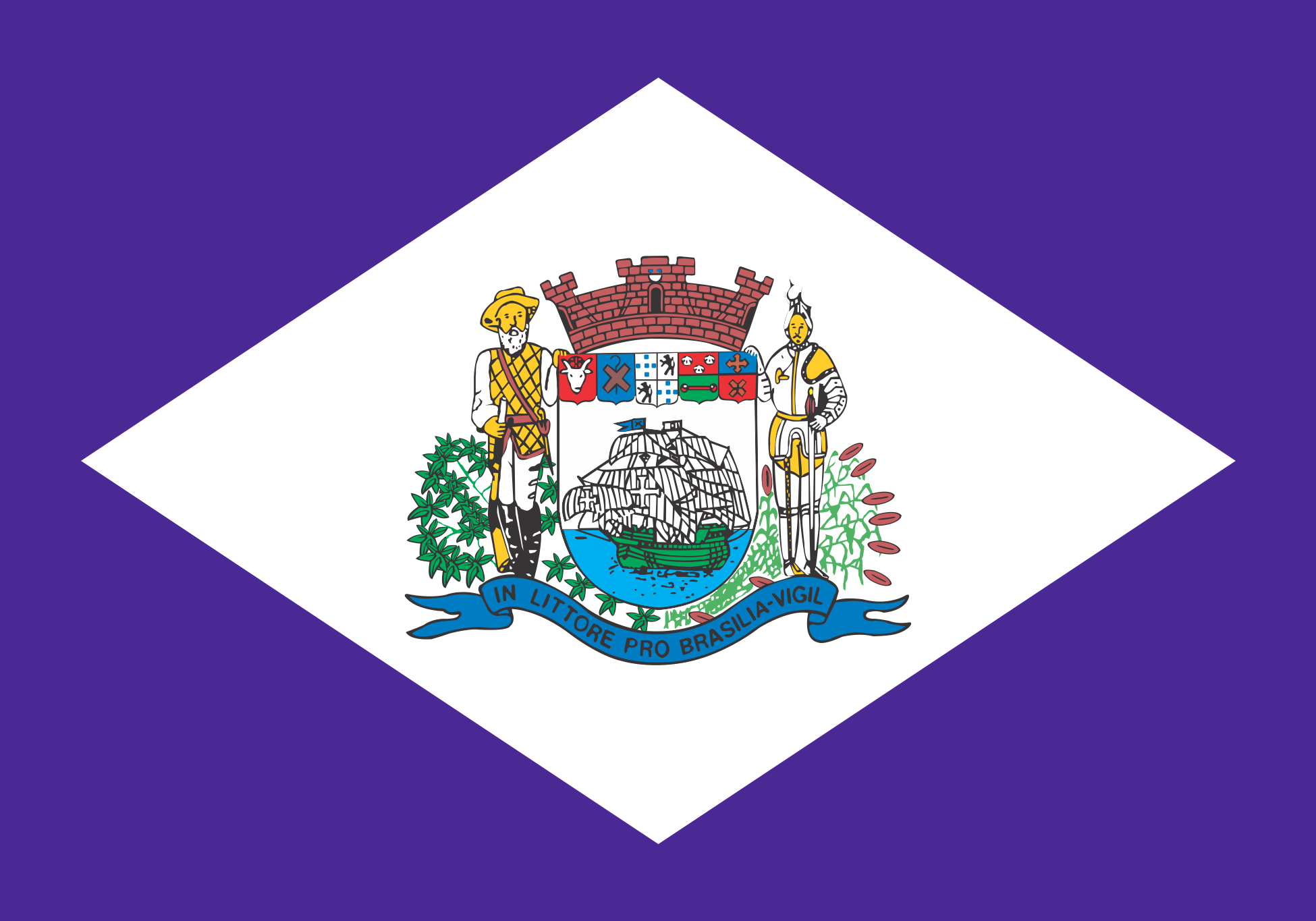
São Francisco do Sul

São Gonçalo

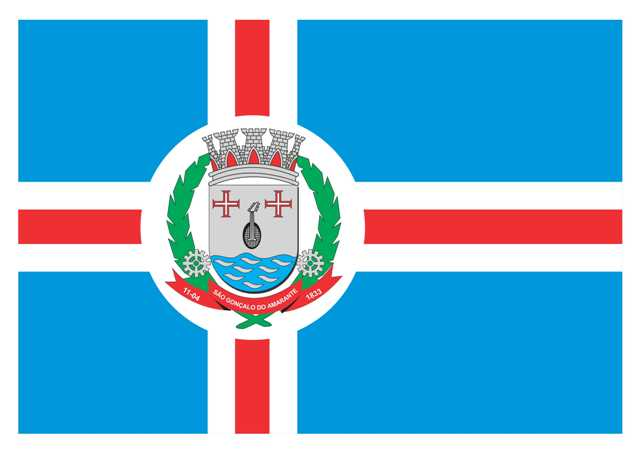
São Gonçalo do Amarante

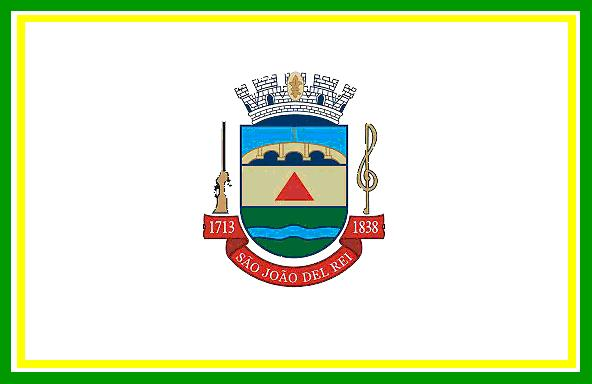
São João del-Rei

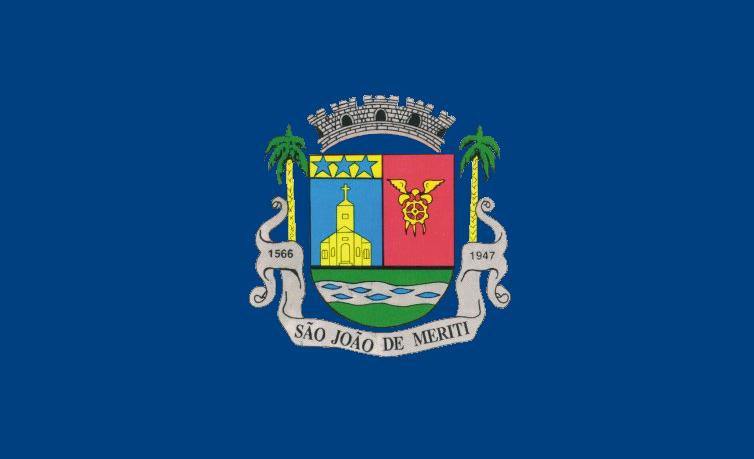
São João de Meriti

São Jorge do Ivaí

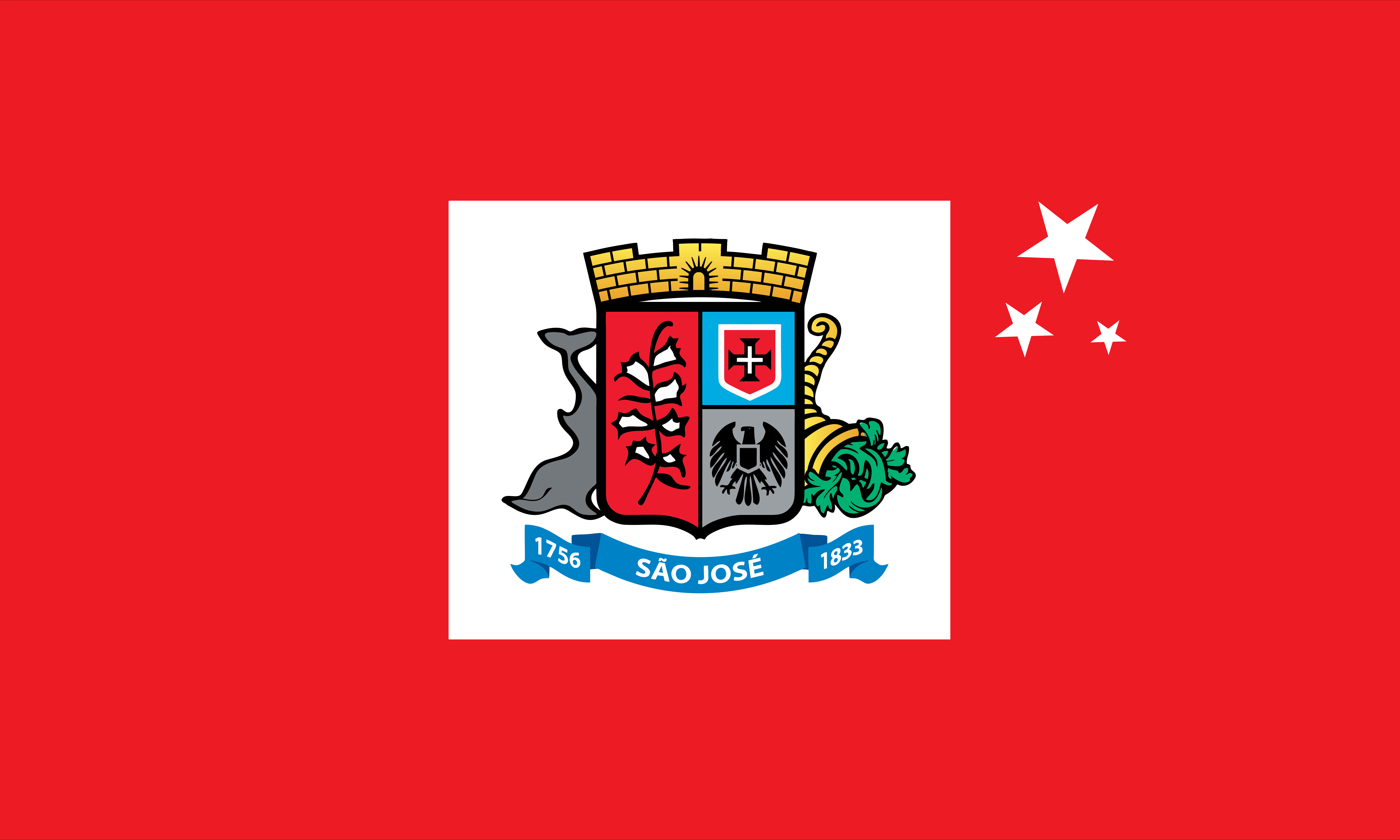
São José

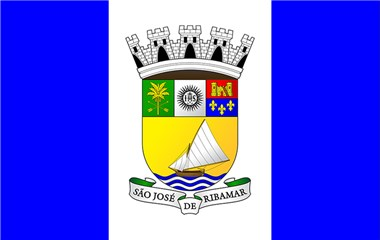
São José de Ribamar

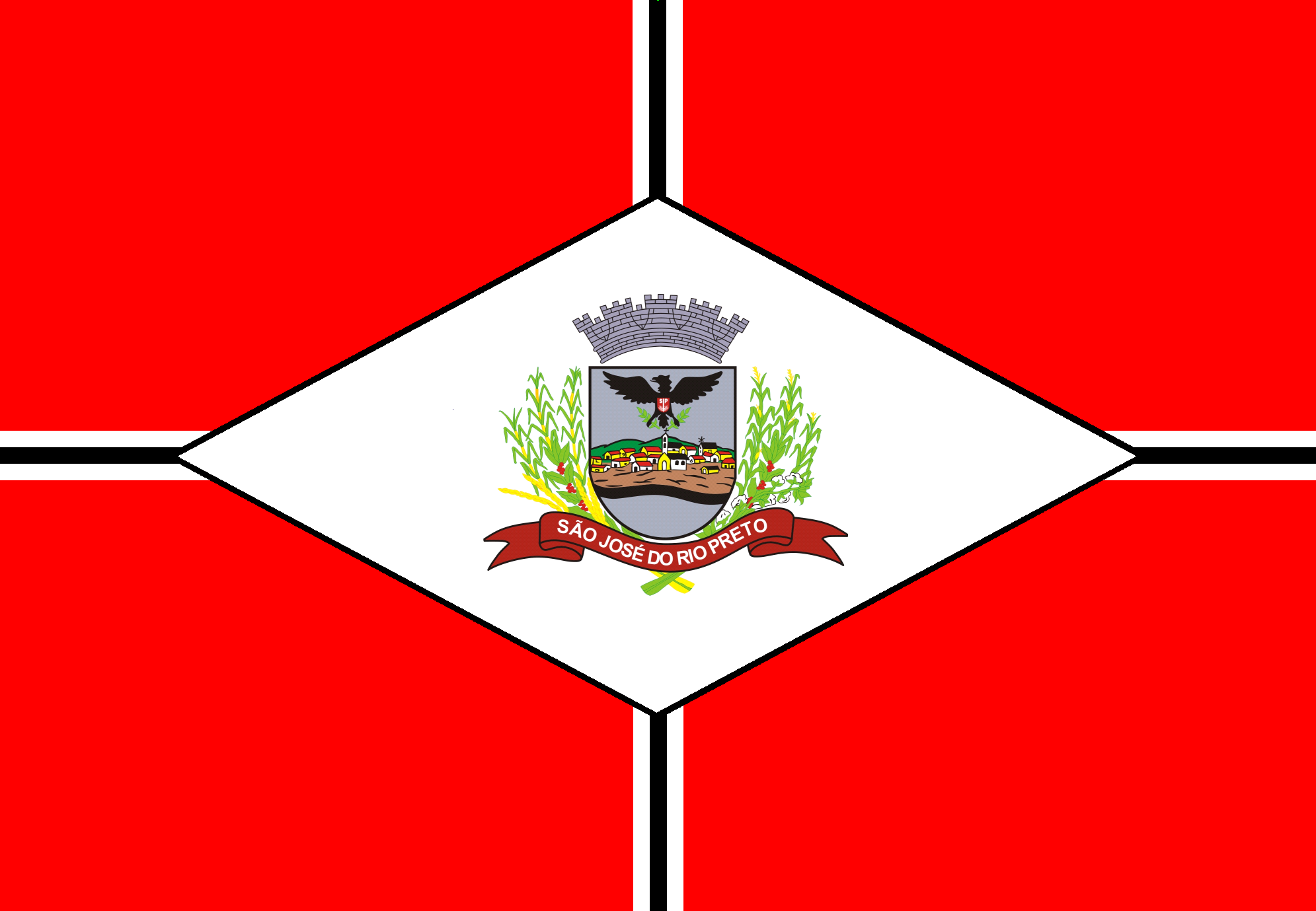
São José do Rio Preto

São José dos Campos

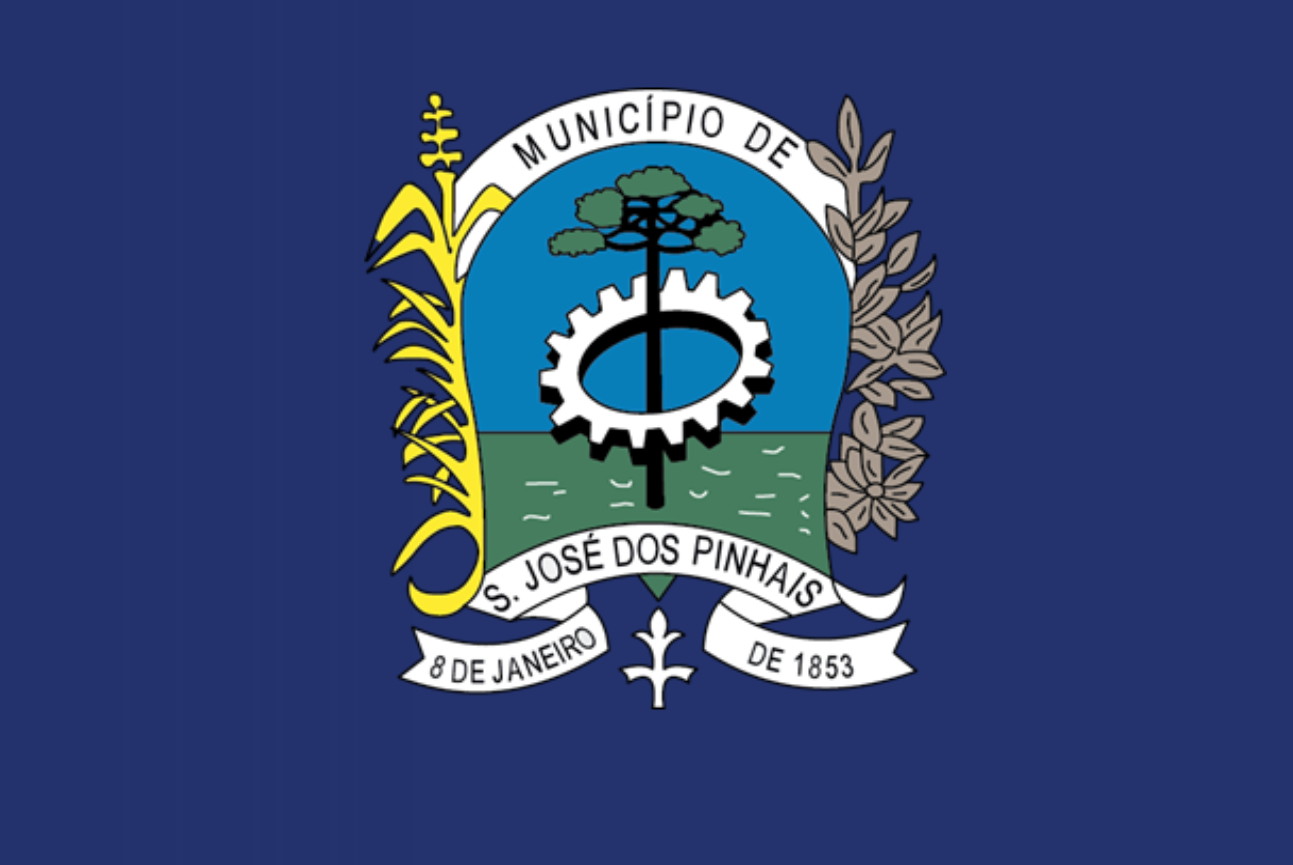
São José dos Pinhais

São Leopoldo

São Lourenço da Mata

São Luís

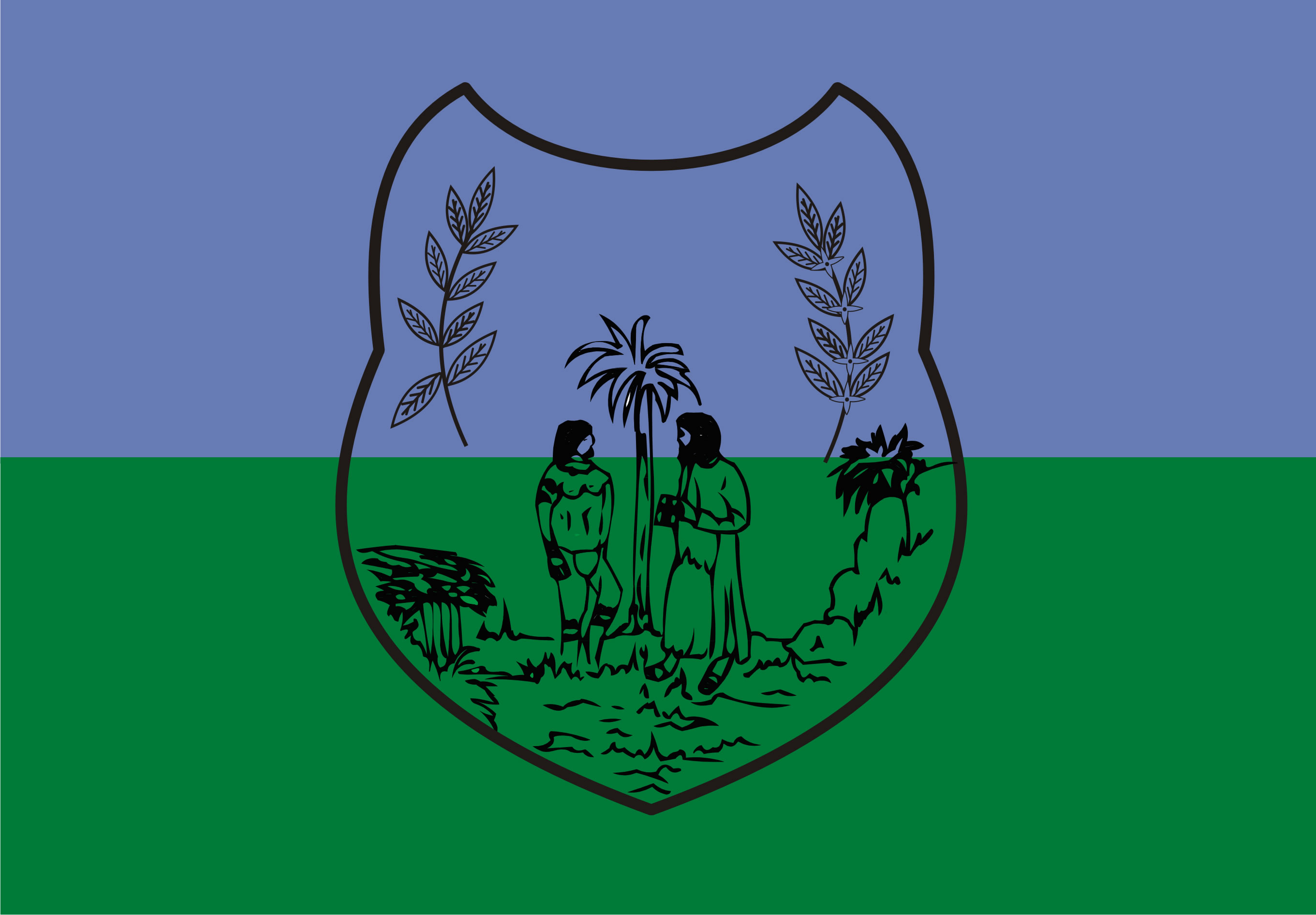
São Mateus

São Paulo

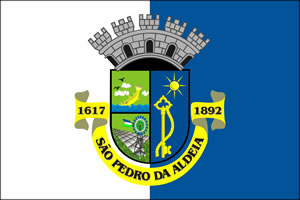
São Pedro da Aldeia

São Sebastião

São Vicente

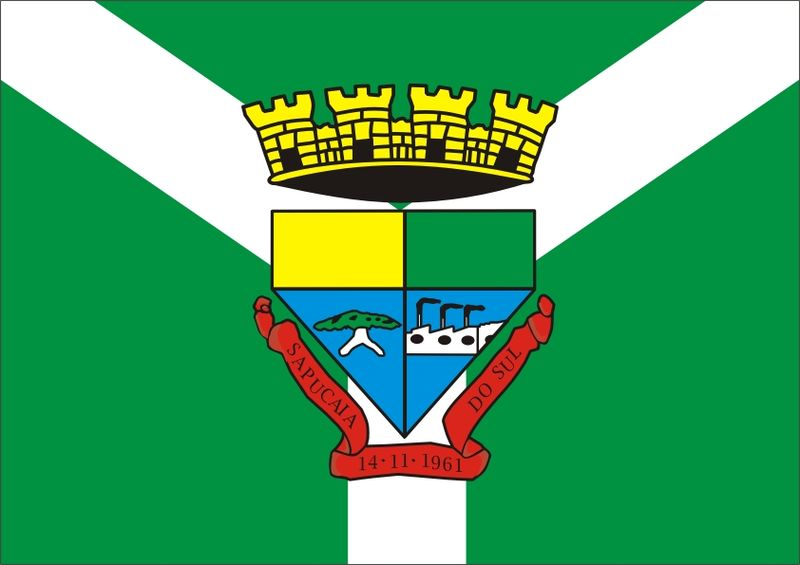
Sapucaia do Sul

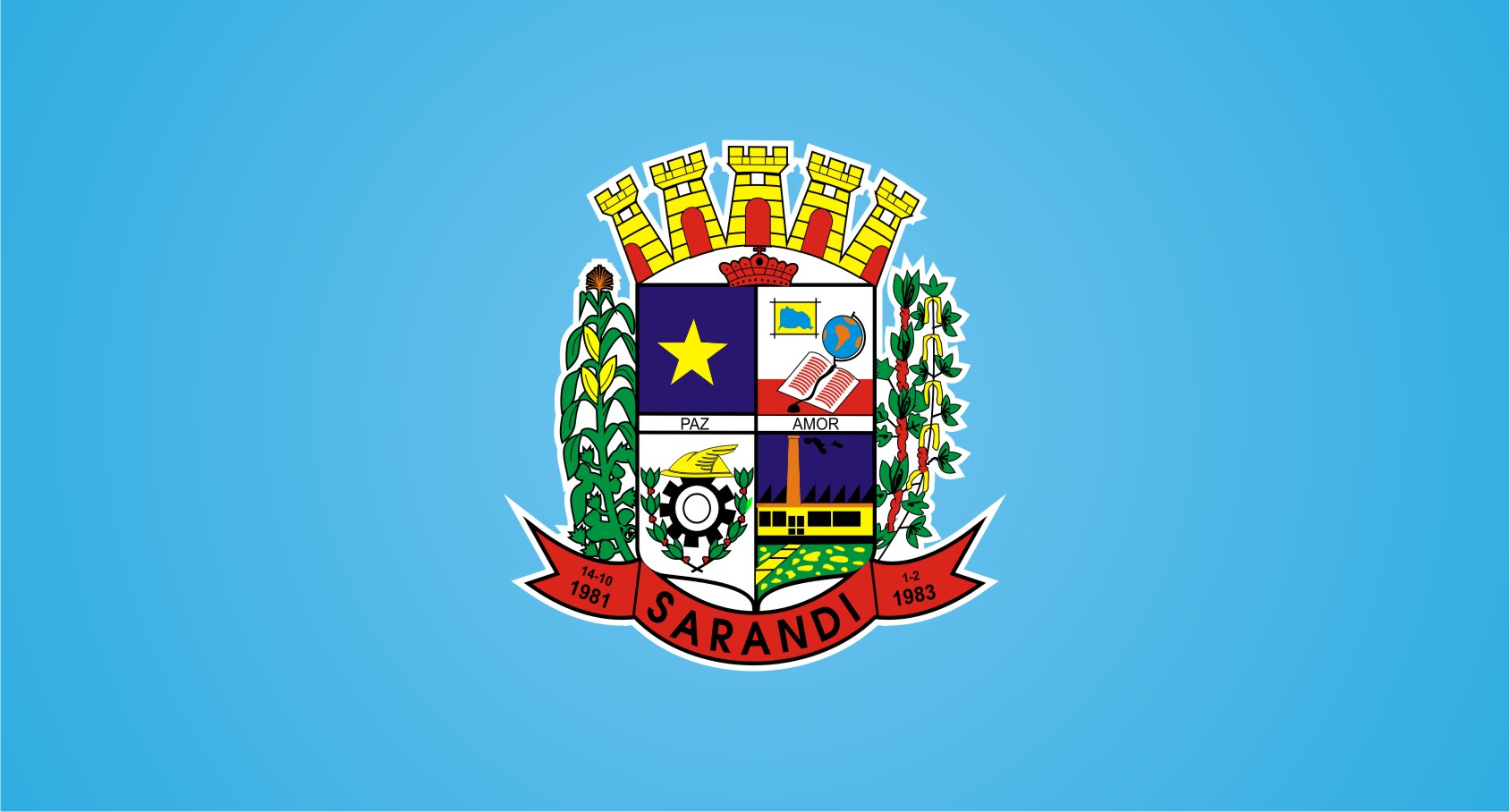
Sarandi

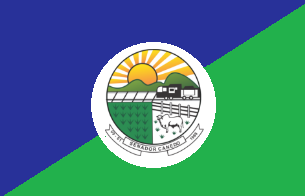
Senador Canedo

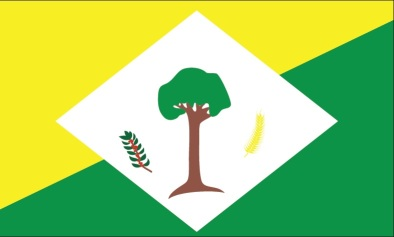
Senador Guiomard

Sena Madureira

Senhor do Bonfim

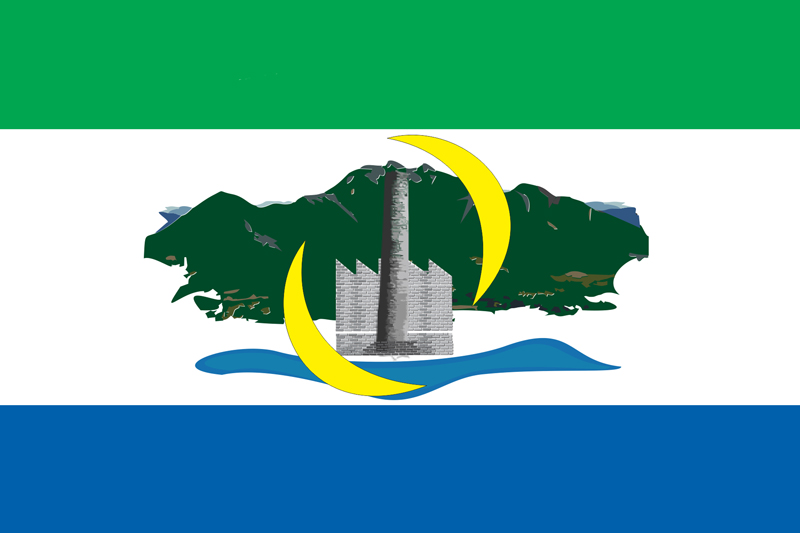
Serra

Sertãozinho

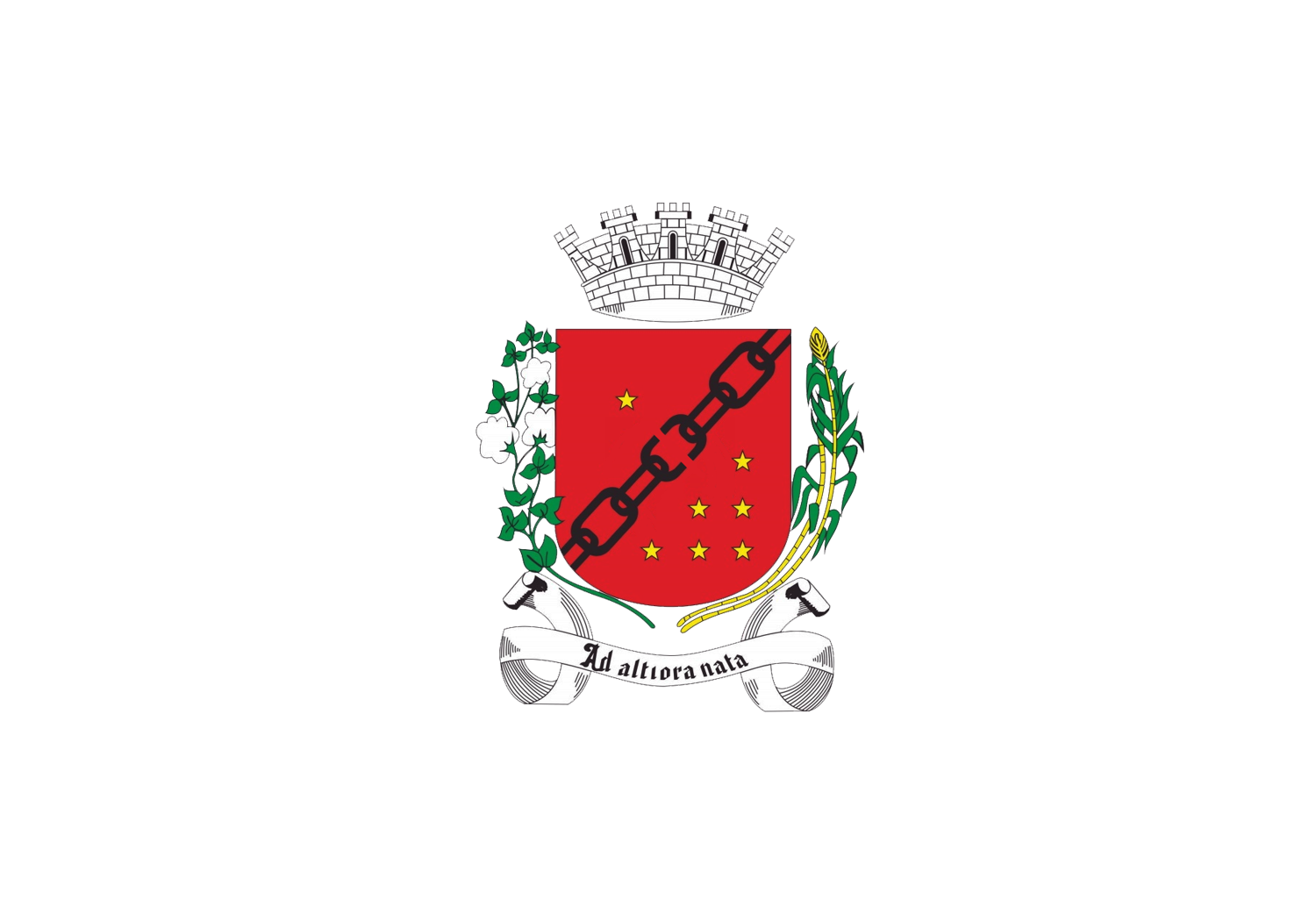
Sete Lagoas

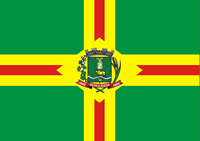
Sidrolândia

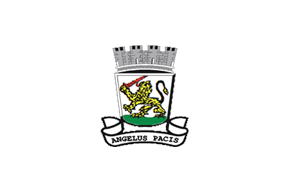
Simões Filho

Sinop

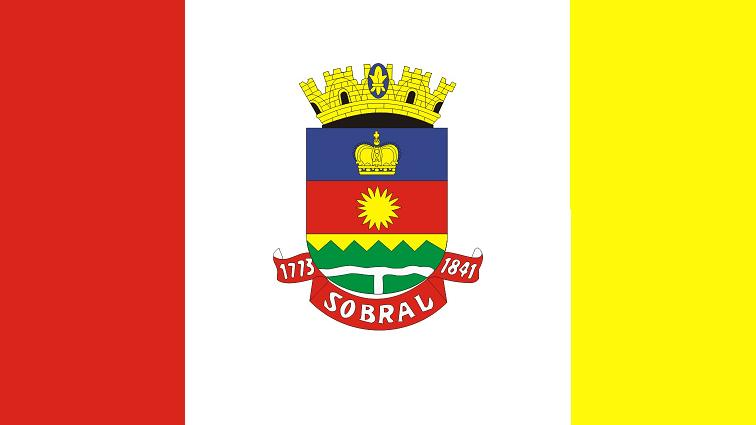
Sobral

Sorocaba

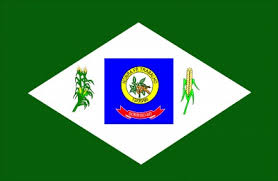
Sorriso

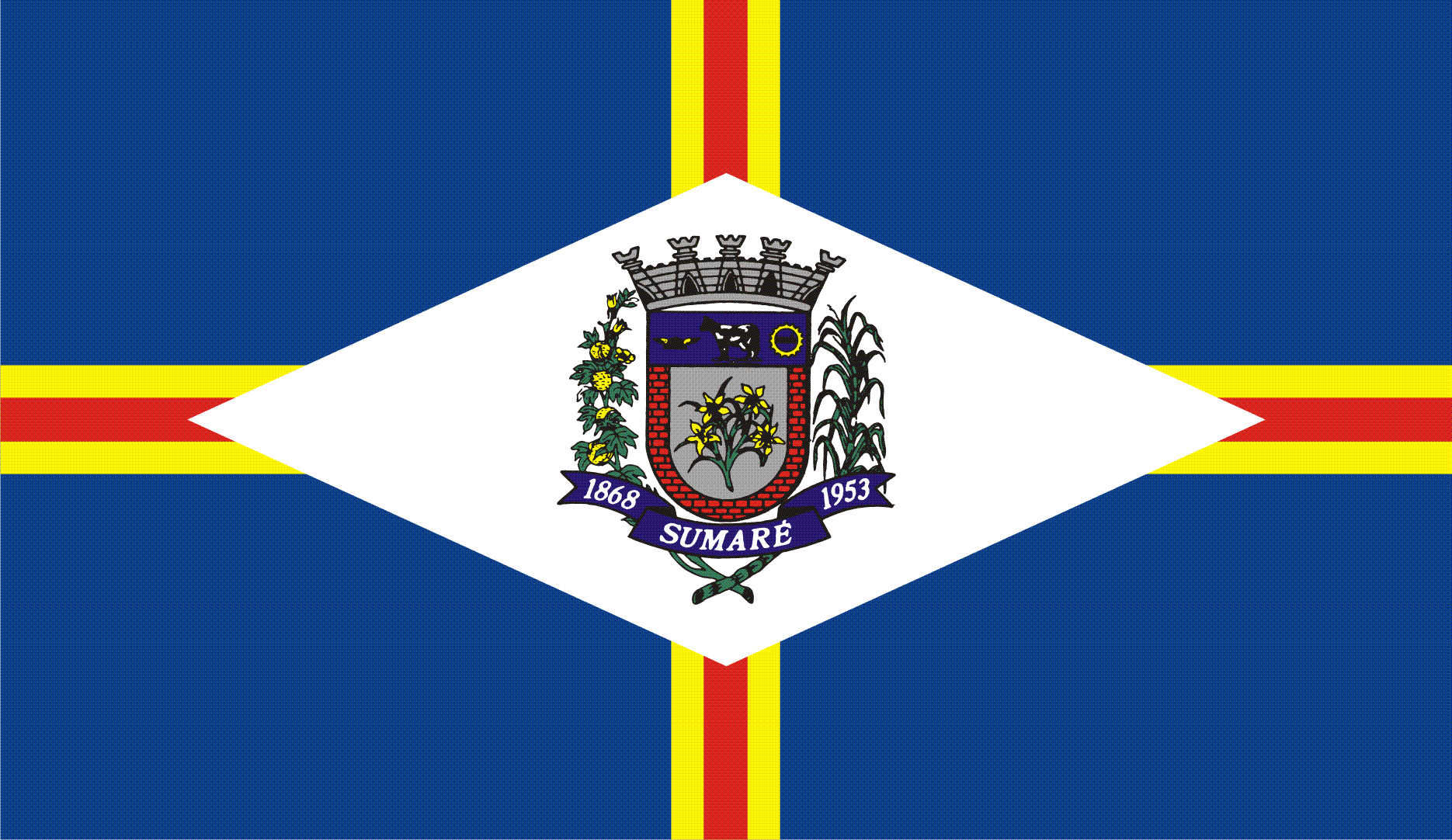
Sumaré

Suzano

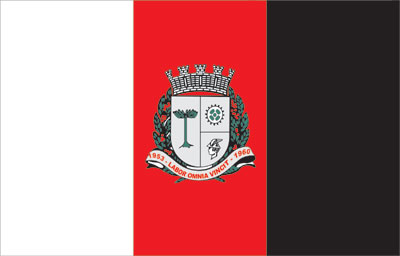
Taboão da Serra

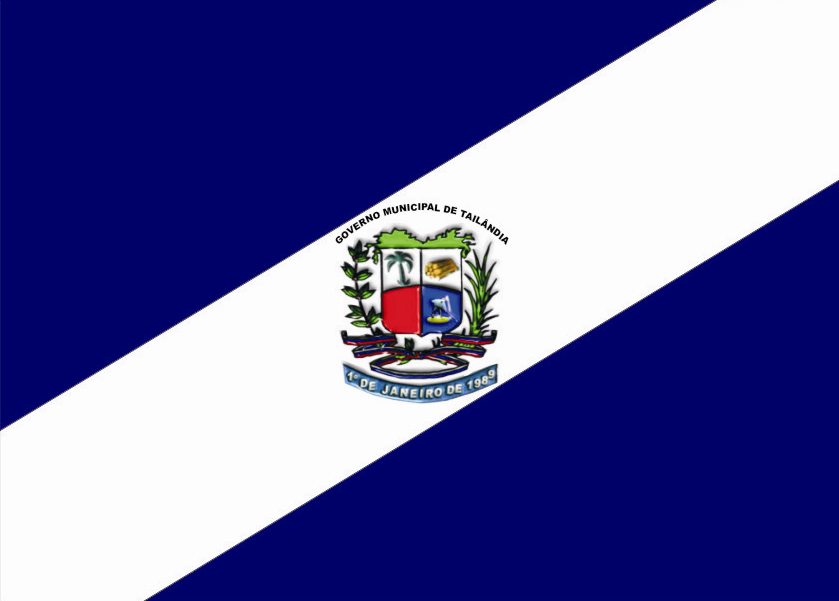
Tailândia

Taió

Tangará da Serra

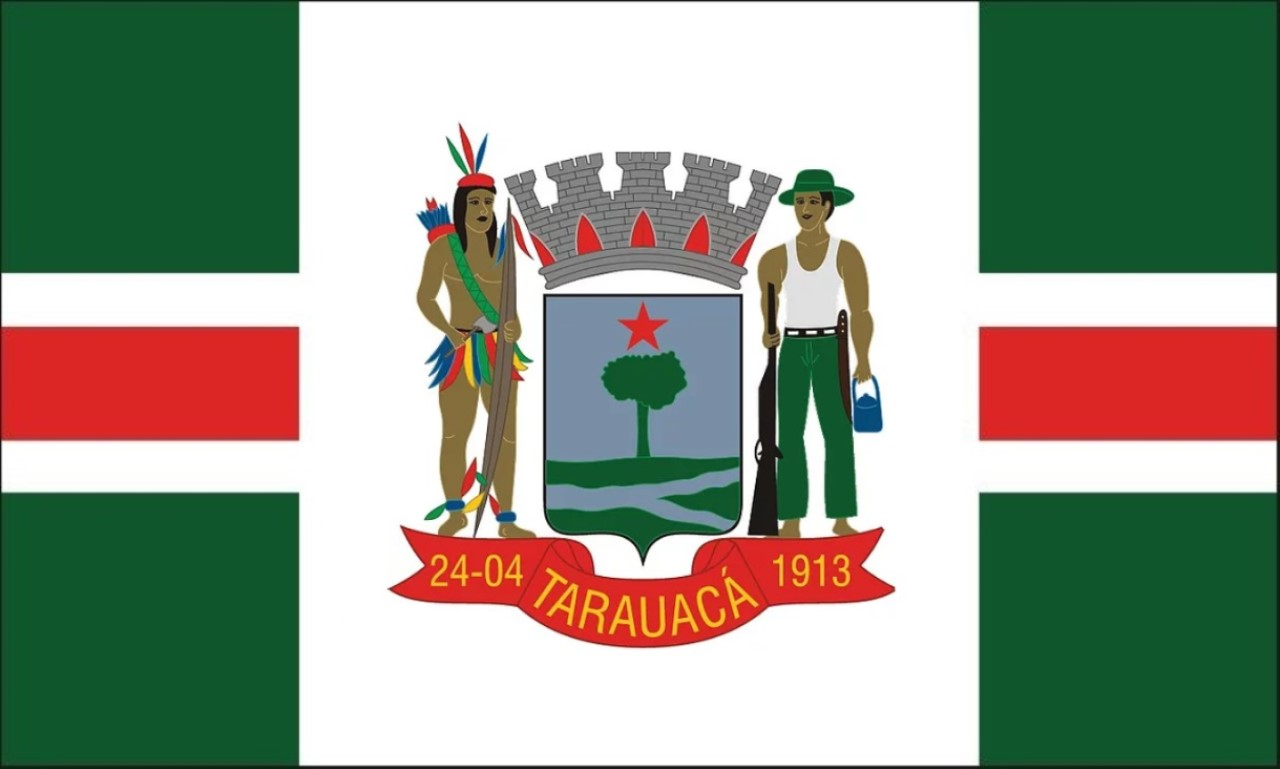
Tarauacá

Tartarugalzinho

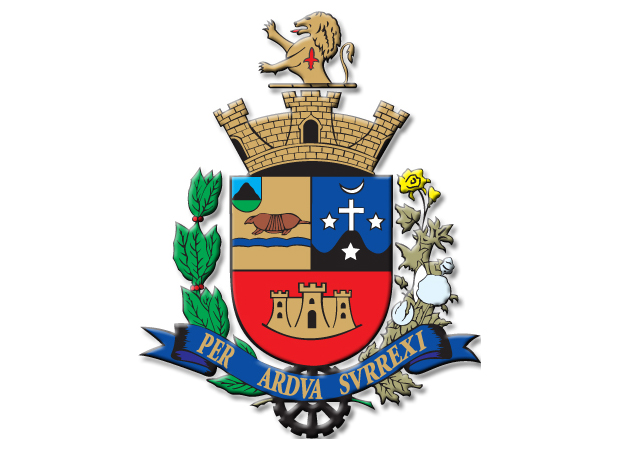
Tatuí

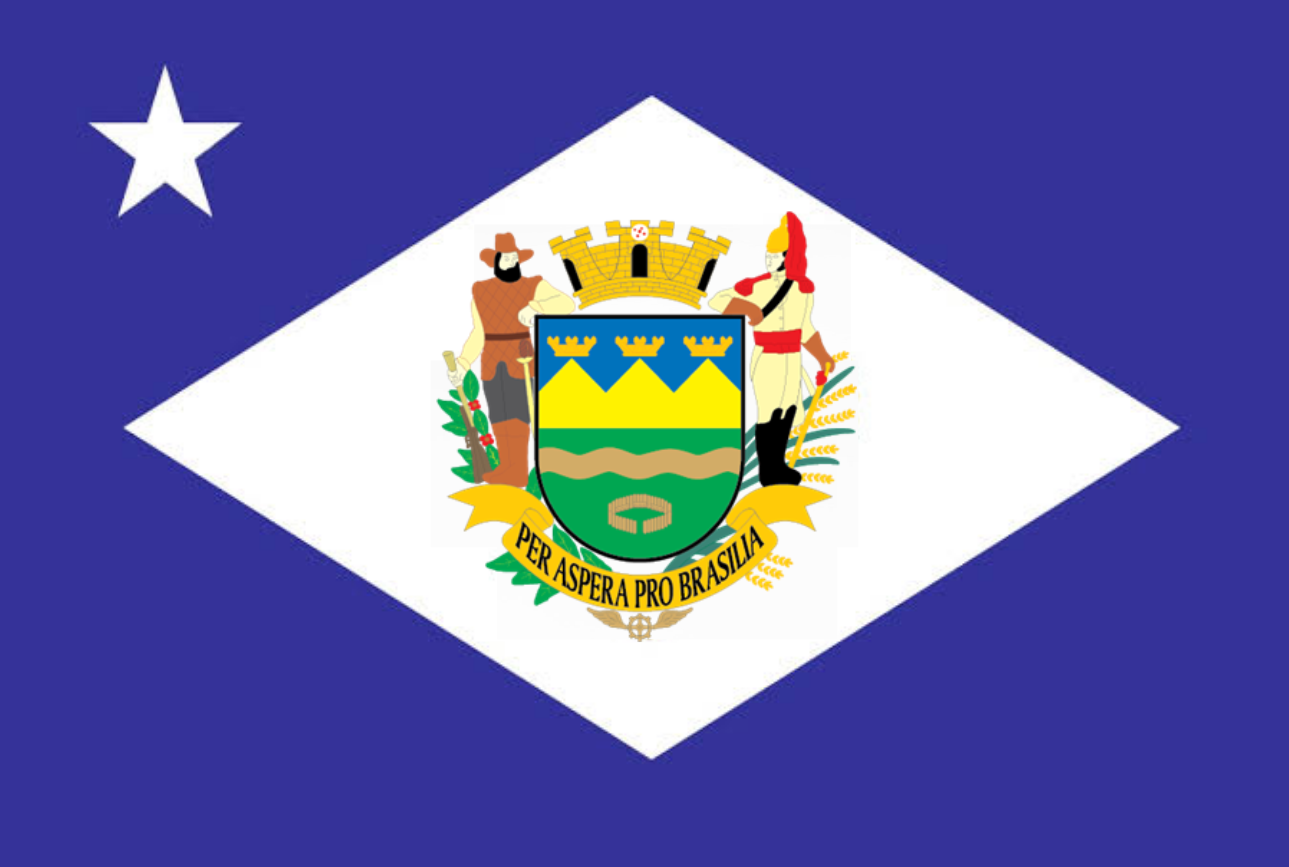
Taubaté

Tefé

Teixeira de Freitas

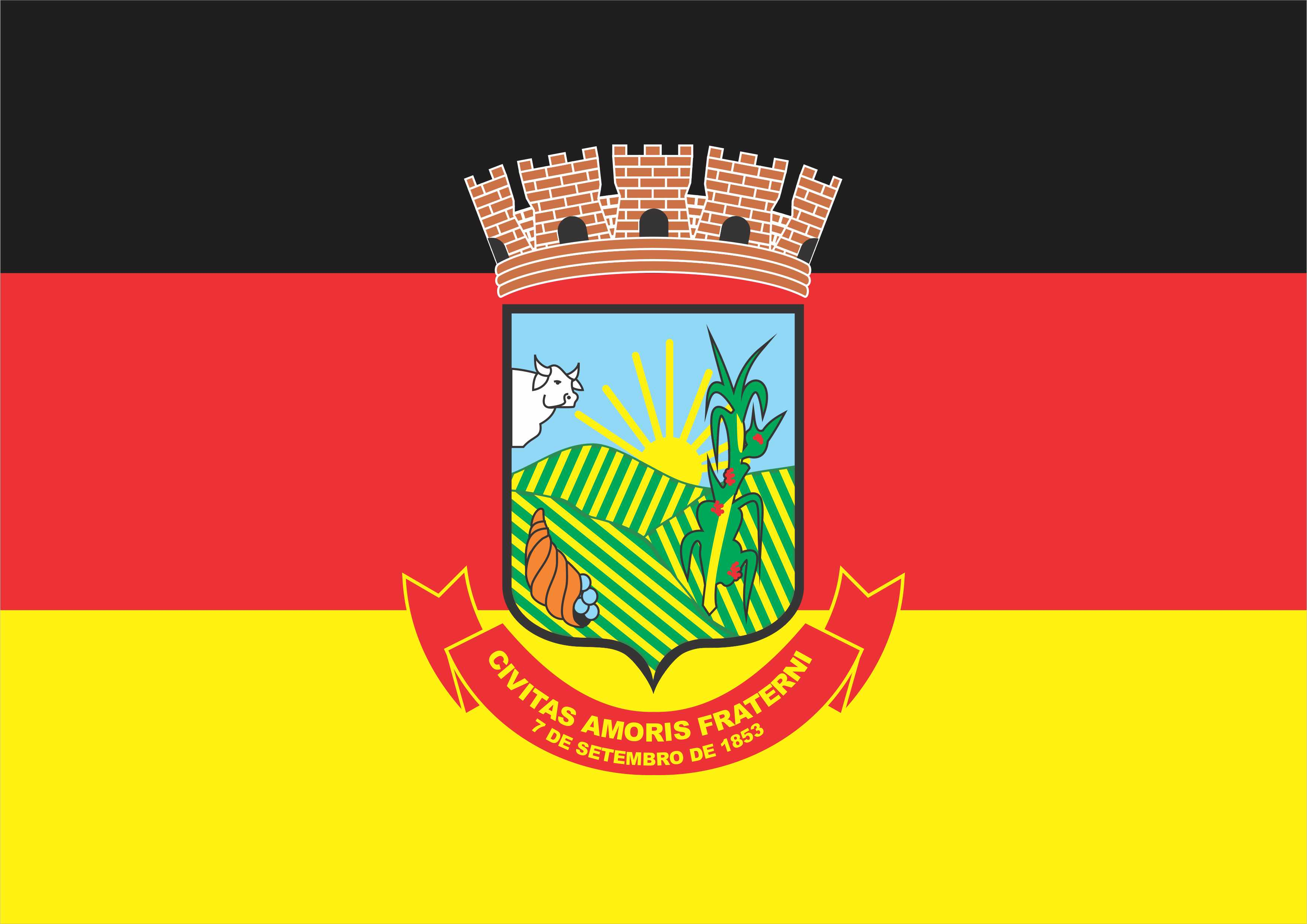
Teófilo Otoni

Teresina

Teresópolis

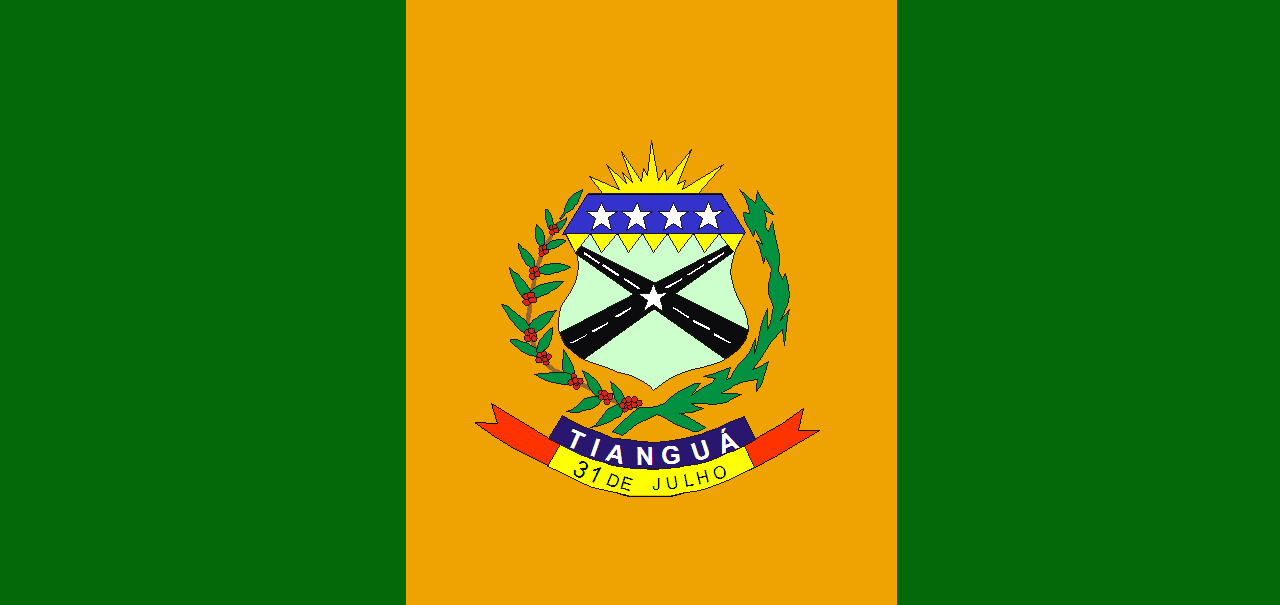
Tianguá

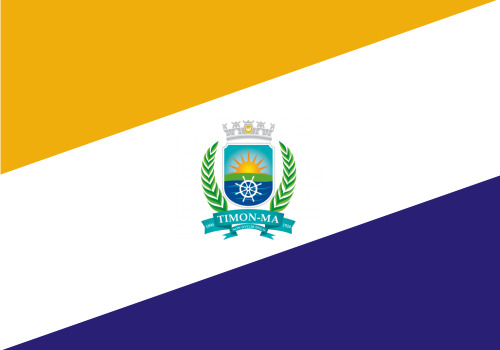
Timon

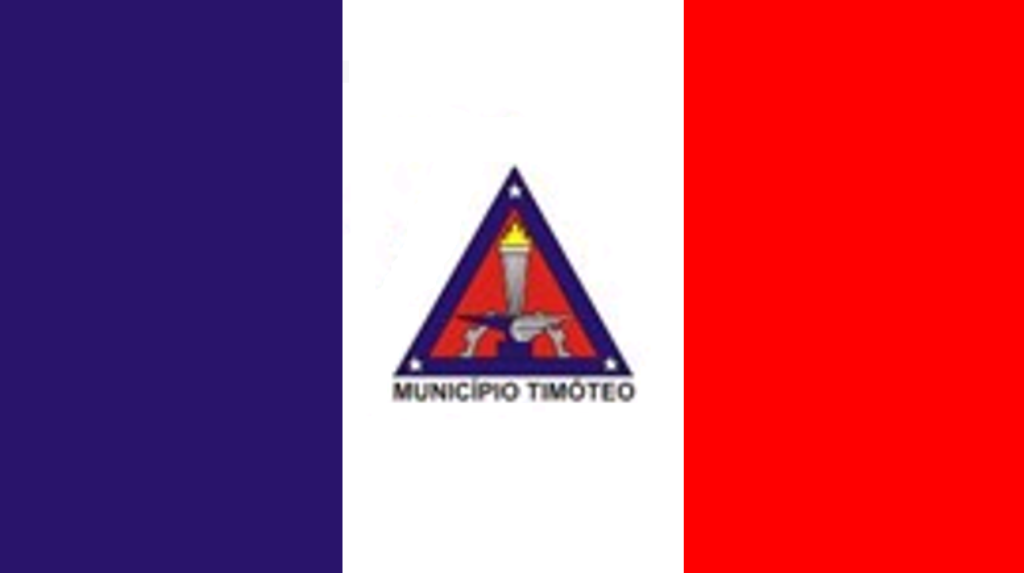
Timóteo

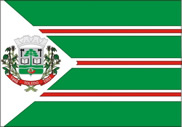
Toledo

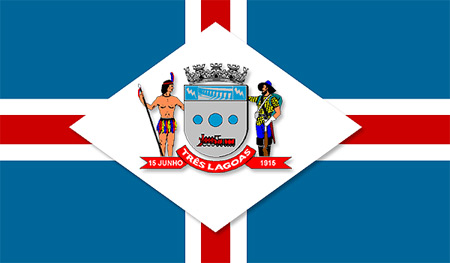
Três Lagoas

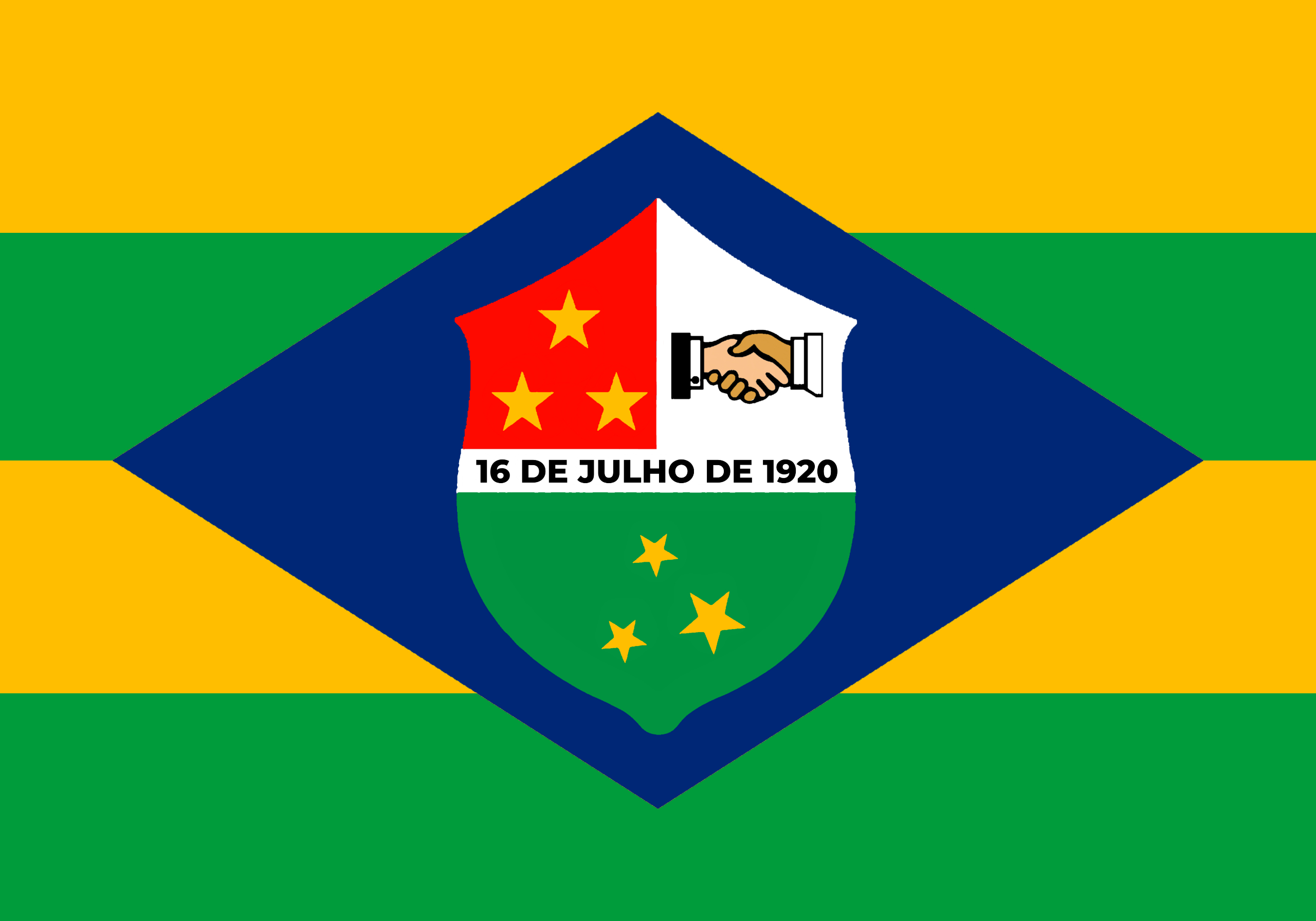
Trindade

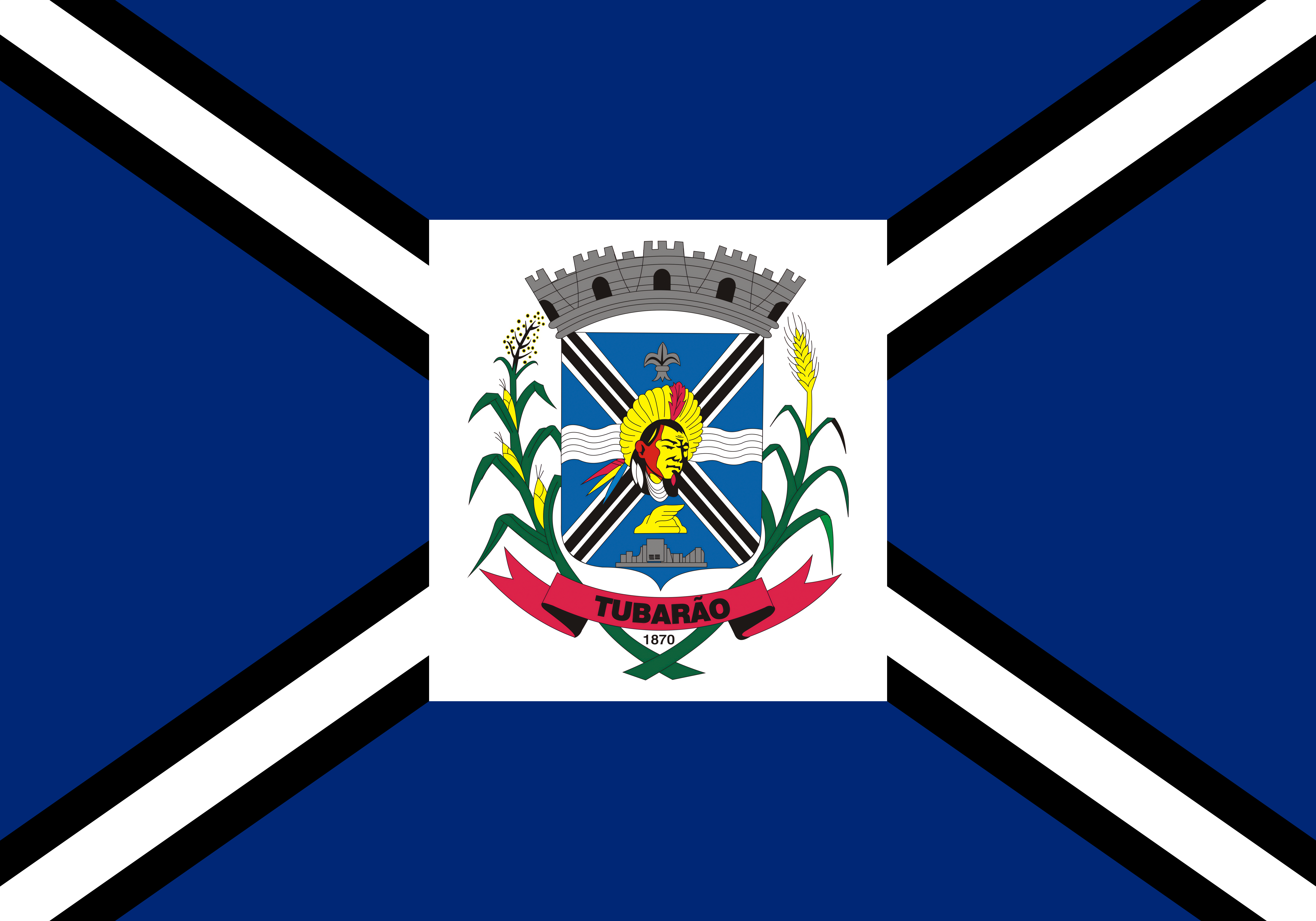
Tubarão

Tucuruí

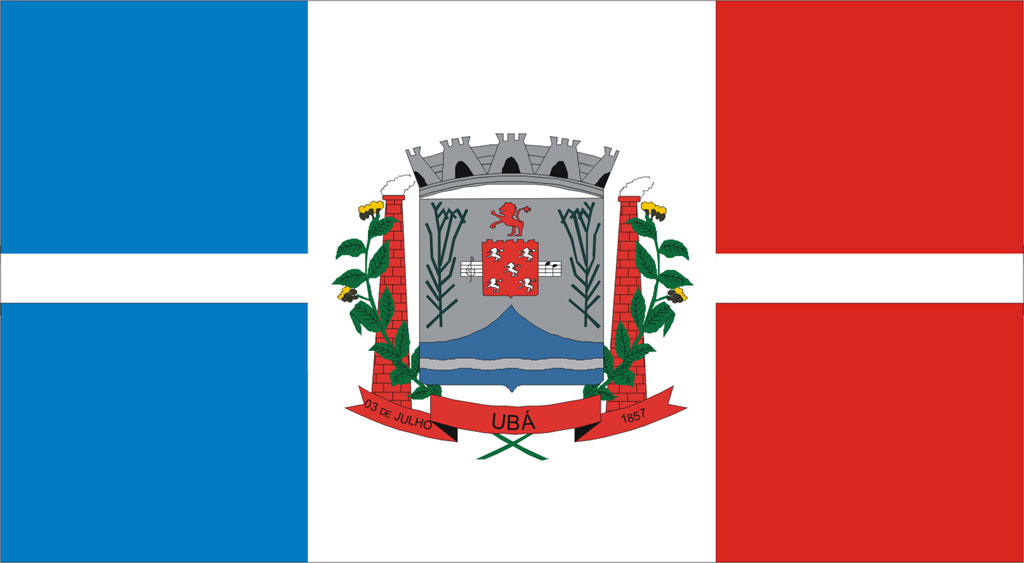
Ubá

Ubatuba

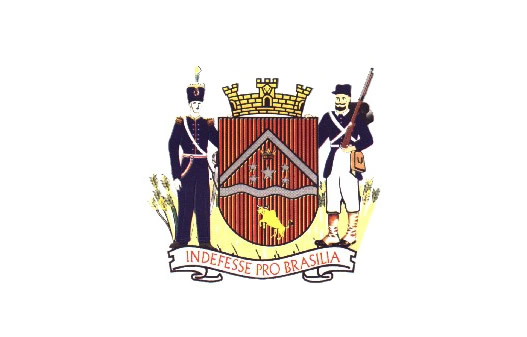
Uberaba

Uberlândia

Uiramutã

Umuarama

União dos Palmares

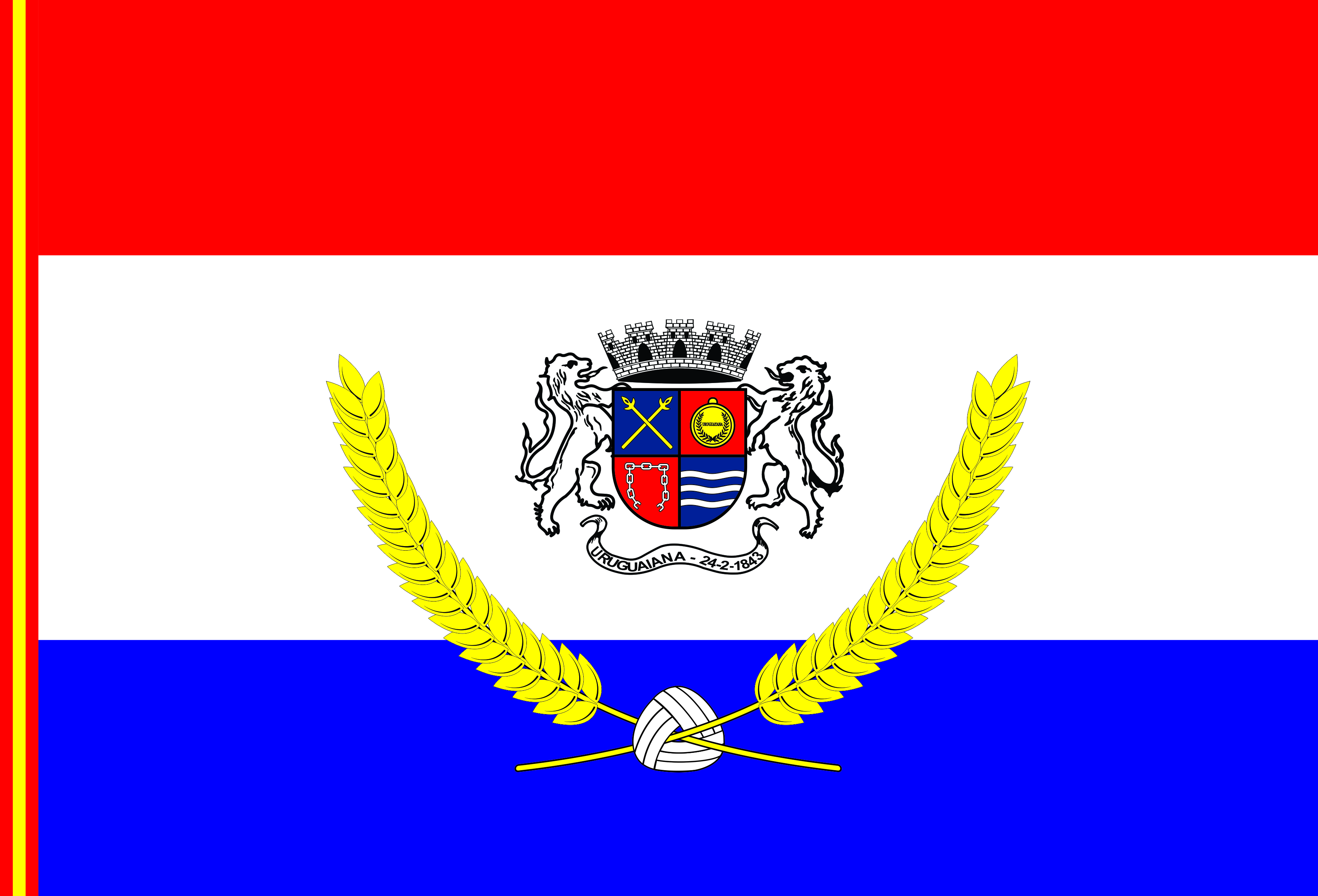
Uruguaiana

Valença

Valinhos

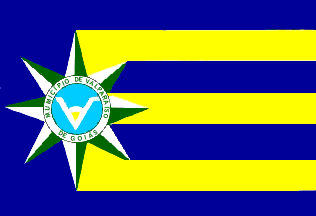
Valparaíso de Goiás

Vargem Grande Paulista

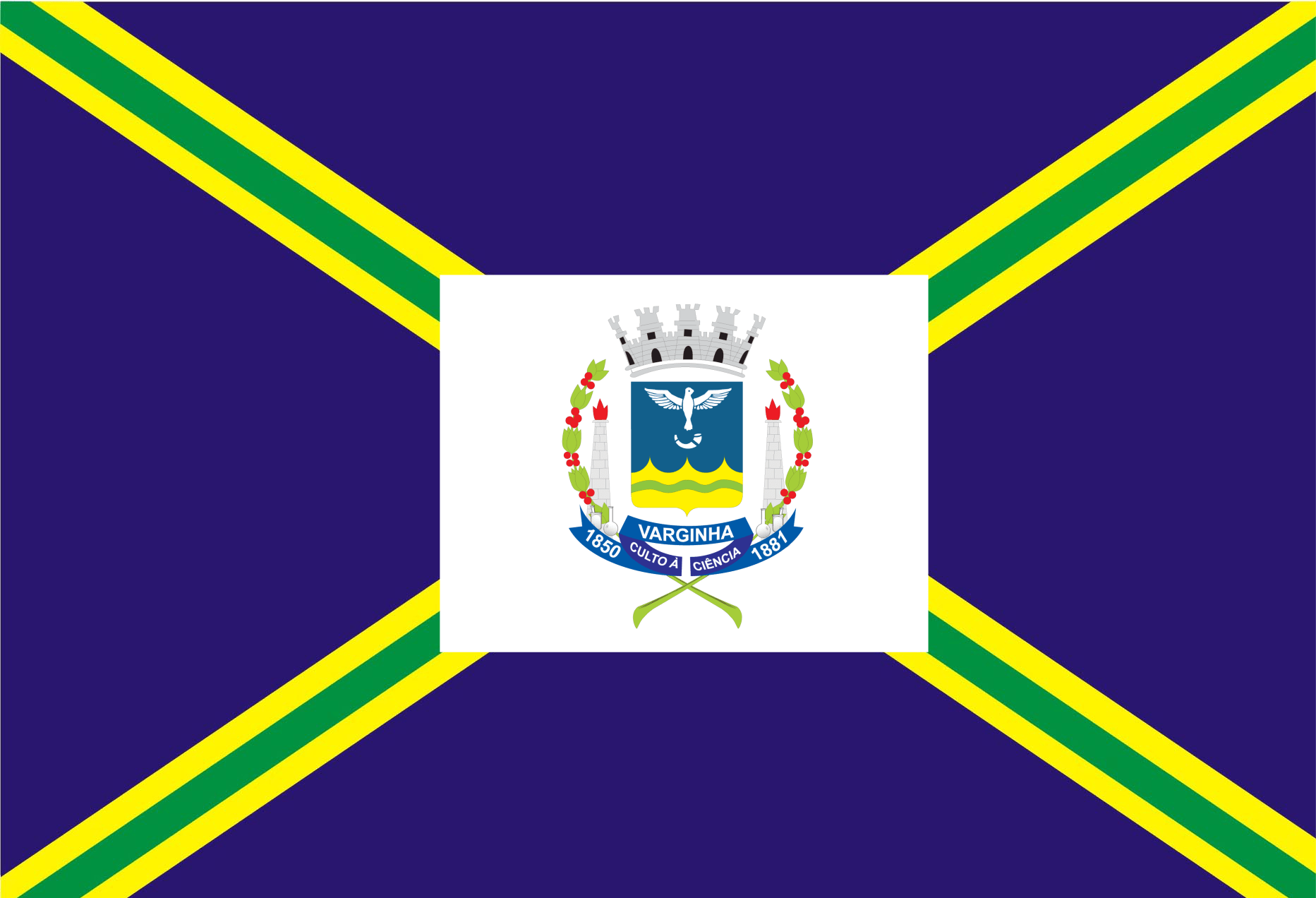
Varginha

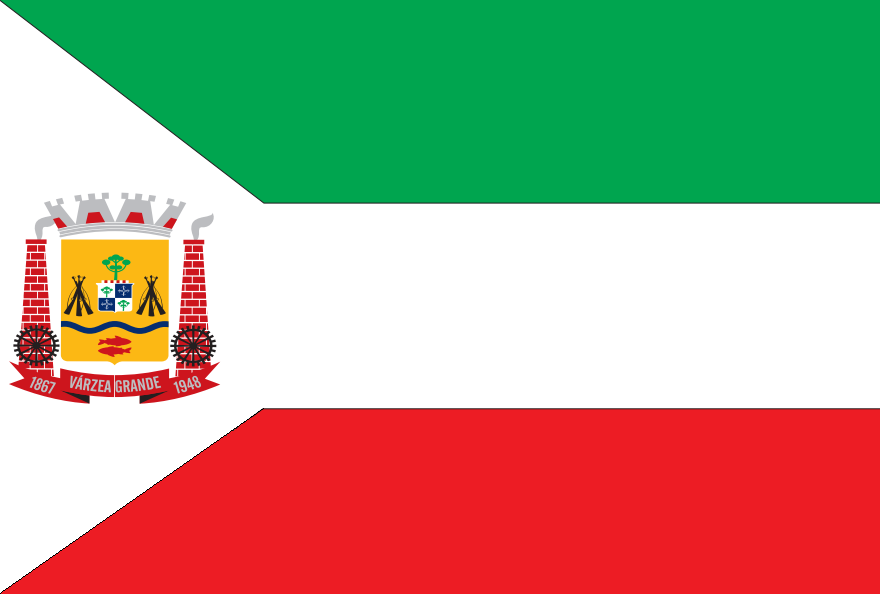
Várzea Grande

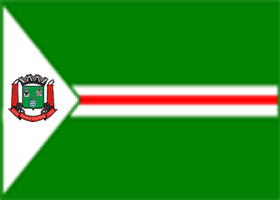
Várzea Paulista

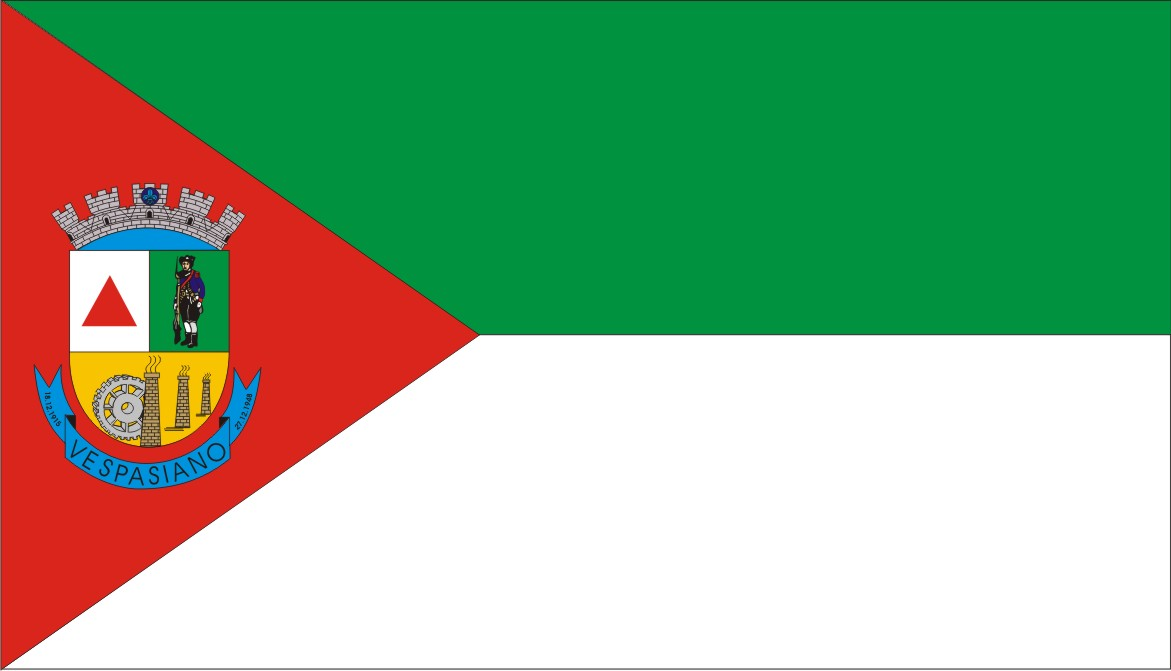
Vespasiano

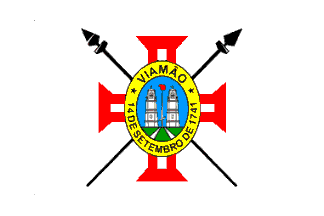
Viamão

Vila Velha

Vilhena

Vitória

Vitória da Conquista

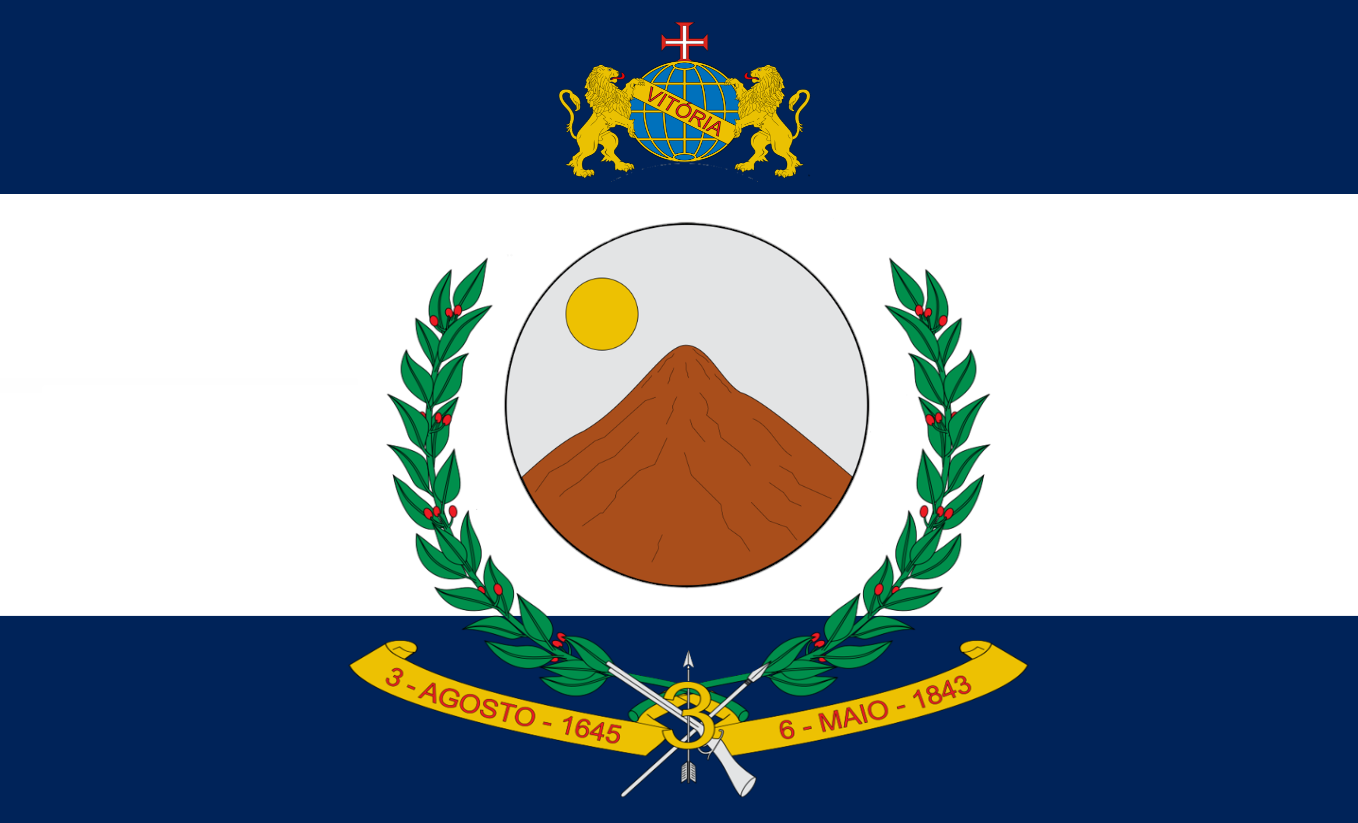
Vitória de Santo Antão

Vitória do Jari

Volta Redonda

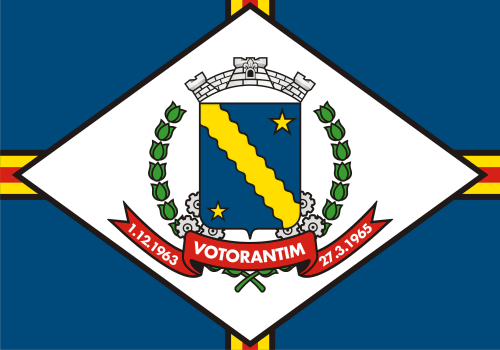
Votorantim

Votuporanga

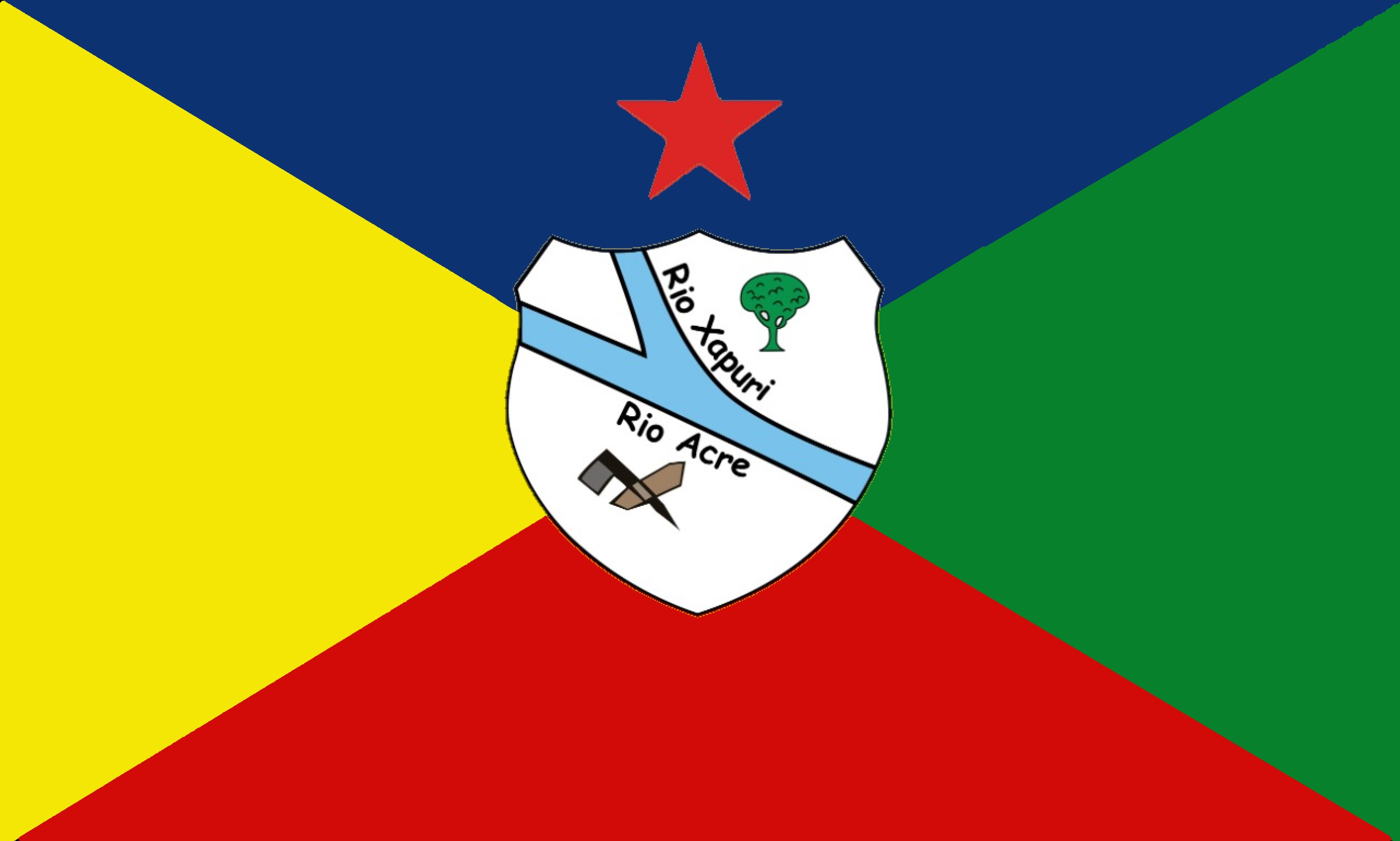
Xapuri

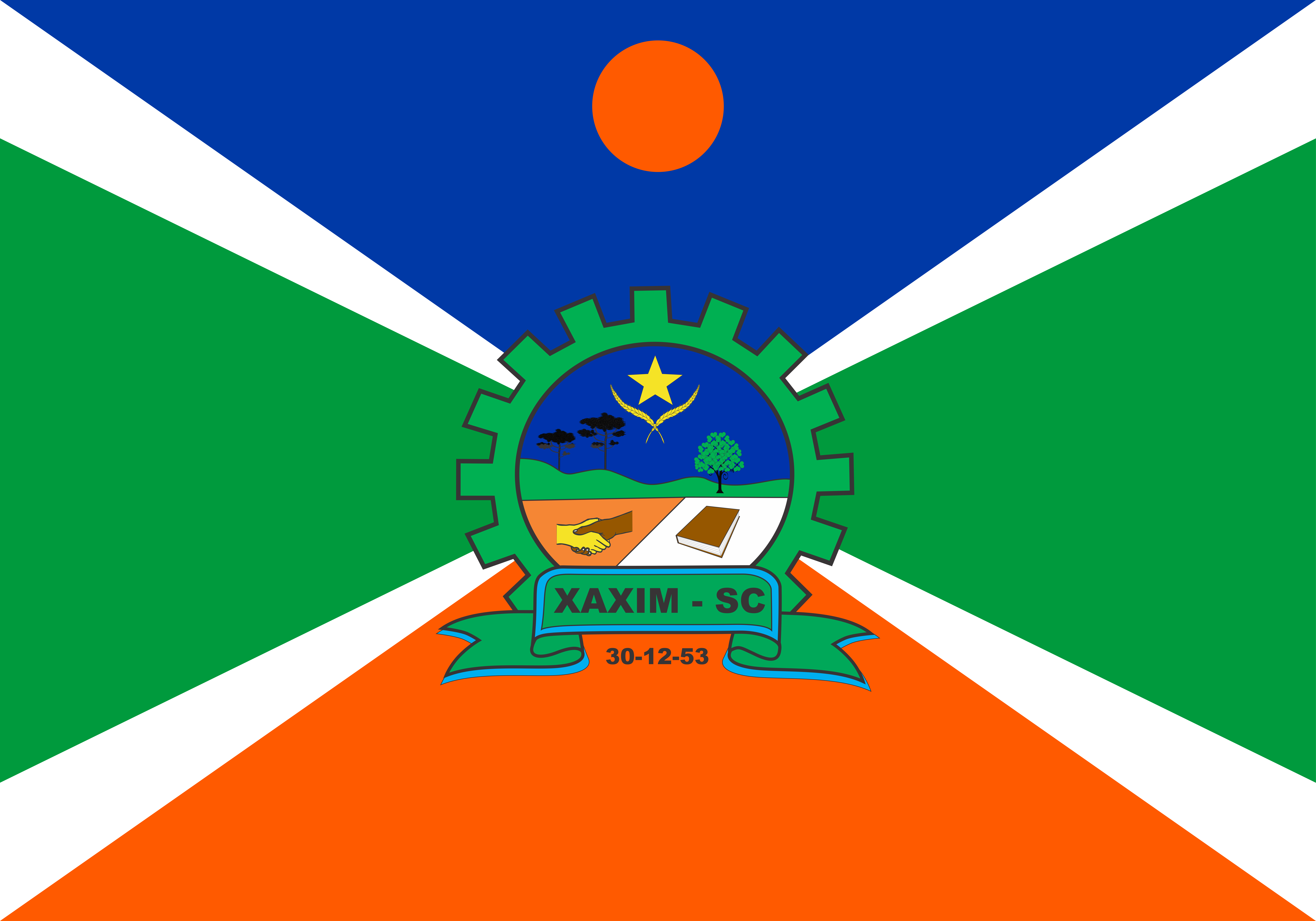
Xaxim

Zé Doca

=== Historical ===
Fortaleza (until 2013)

Rio de Janeiro (1808 - 1822)

Rio de Janeiro (1822 - 1831)

Rio de Janeiro (1831 - 1889)

São Paulo (1603 - 1700/1815)

São Paulo (1950 - 1974)

São Paulo (1974 - 1987)

== Chile ==
Alto Hospicio

Ancud

Arauco

Arica

Cabo de Hornos

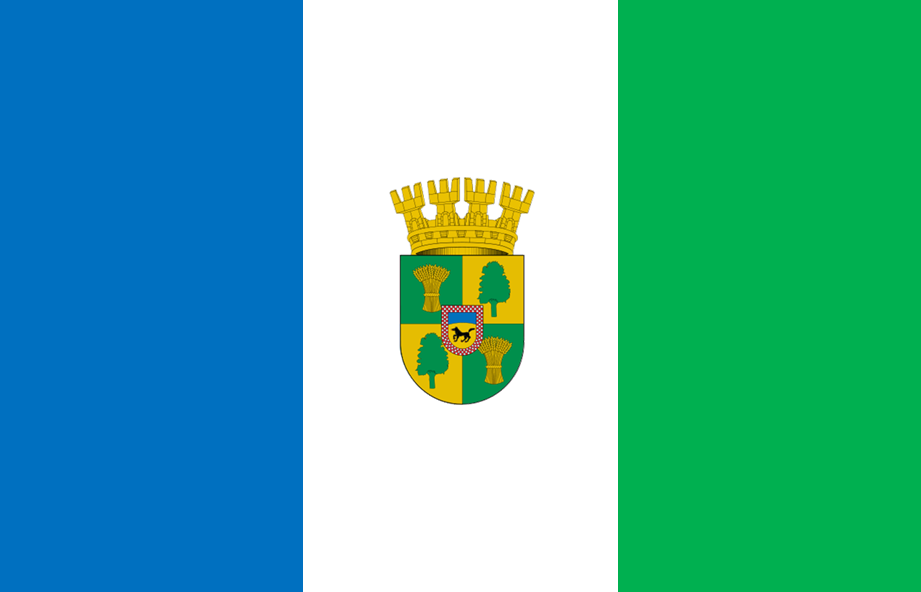
Cabrero

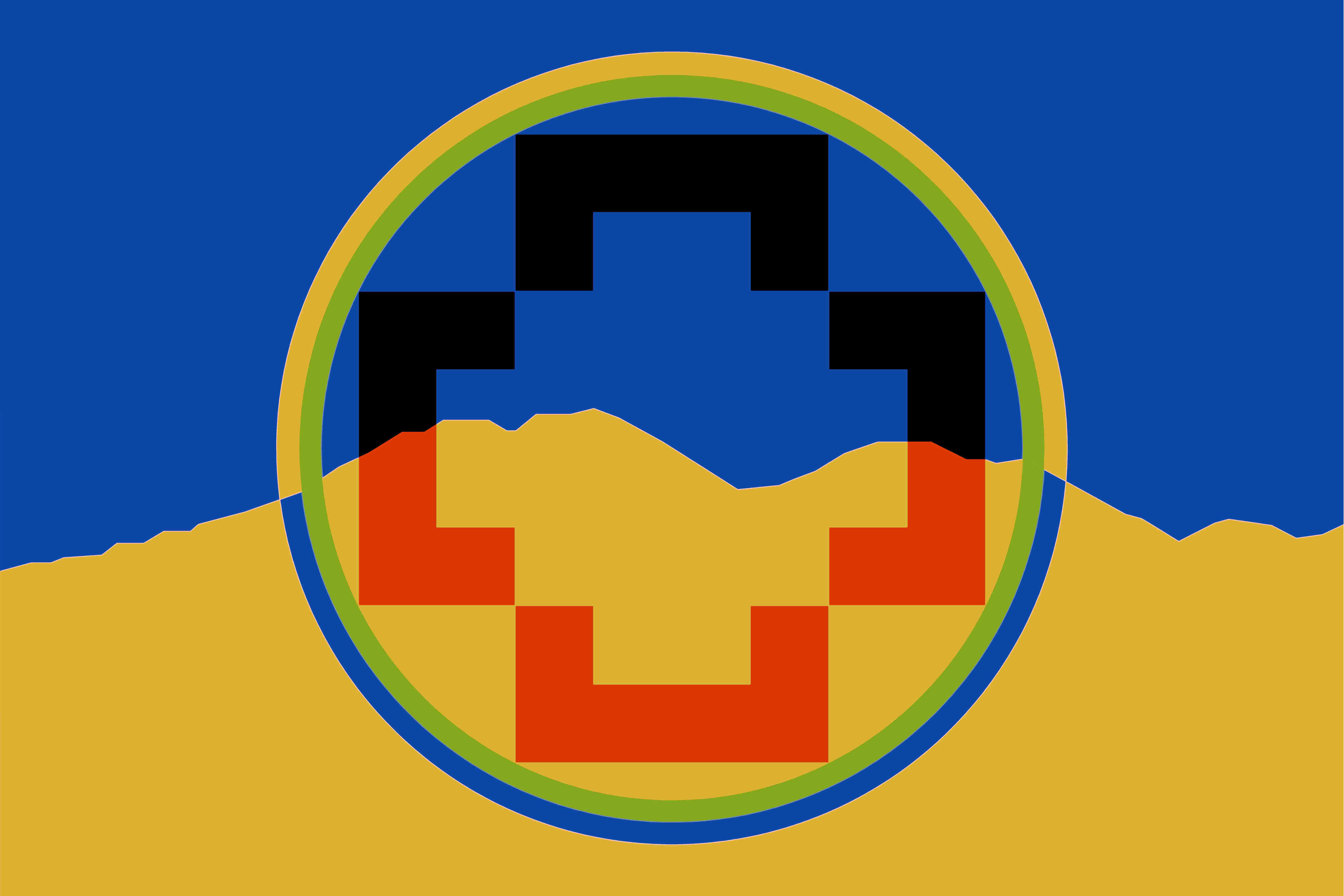
Calama

Calbuco

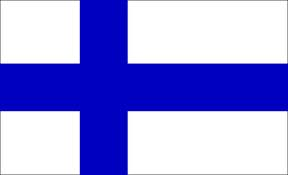
Carahue

Casablanca

Cerro Navia

Chillán Viejo

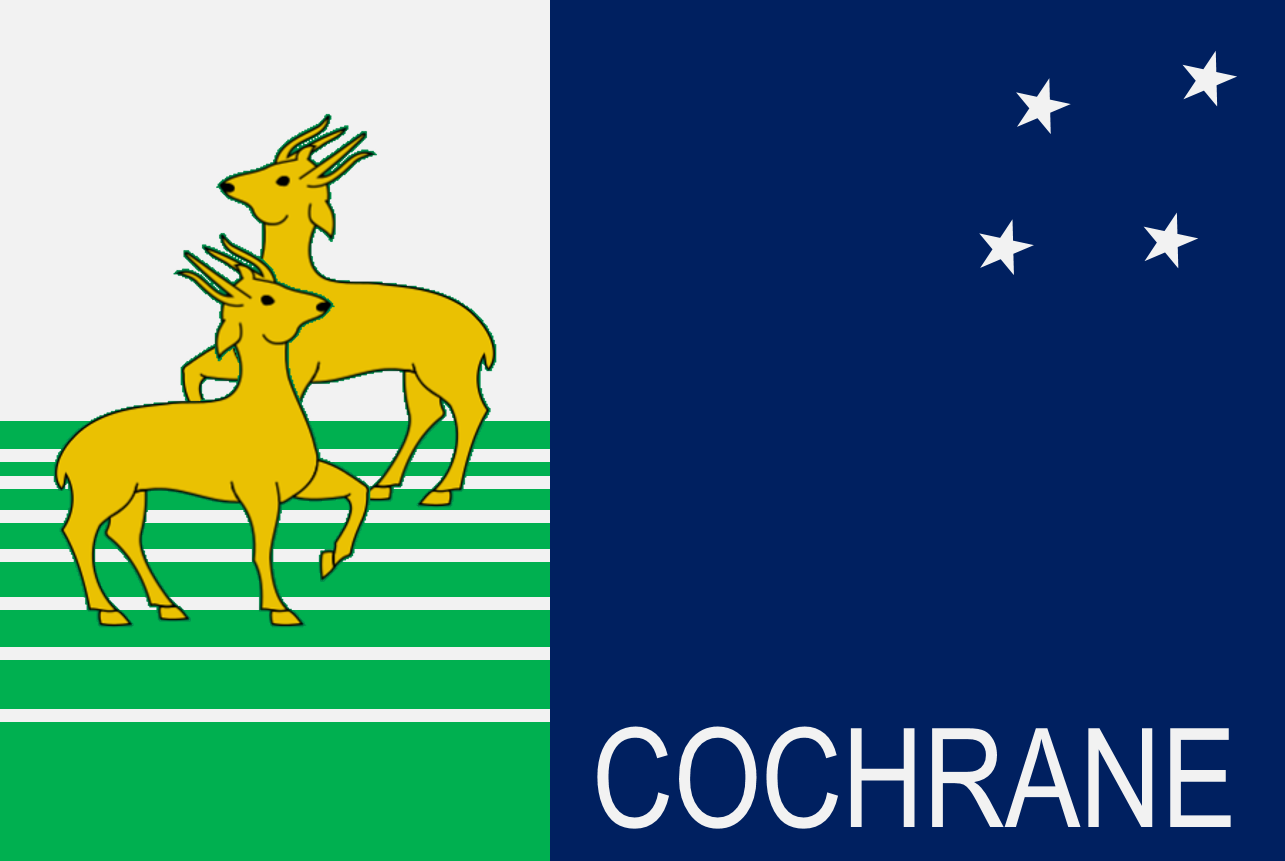
Cochrane

Colchane

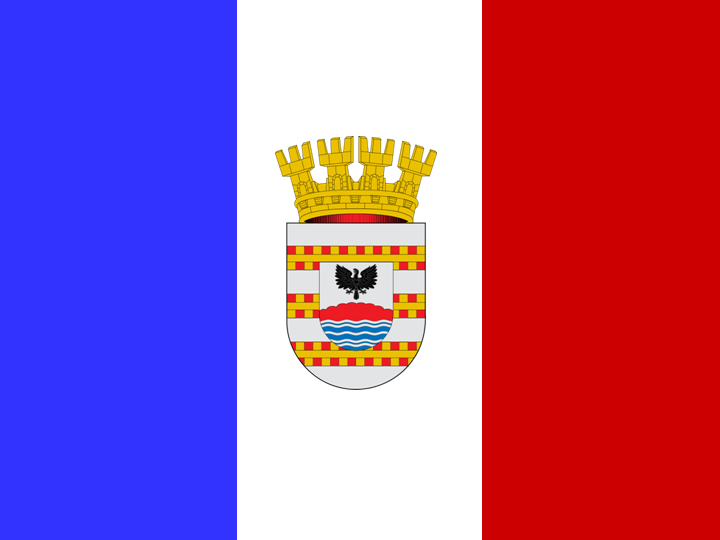
Collipulli

Concepción

Conchalí

Concón

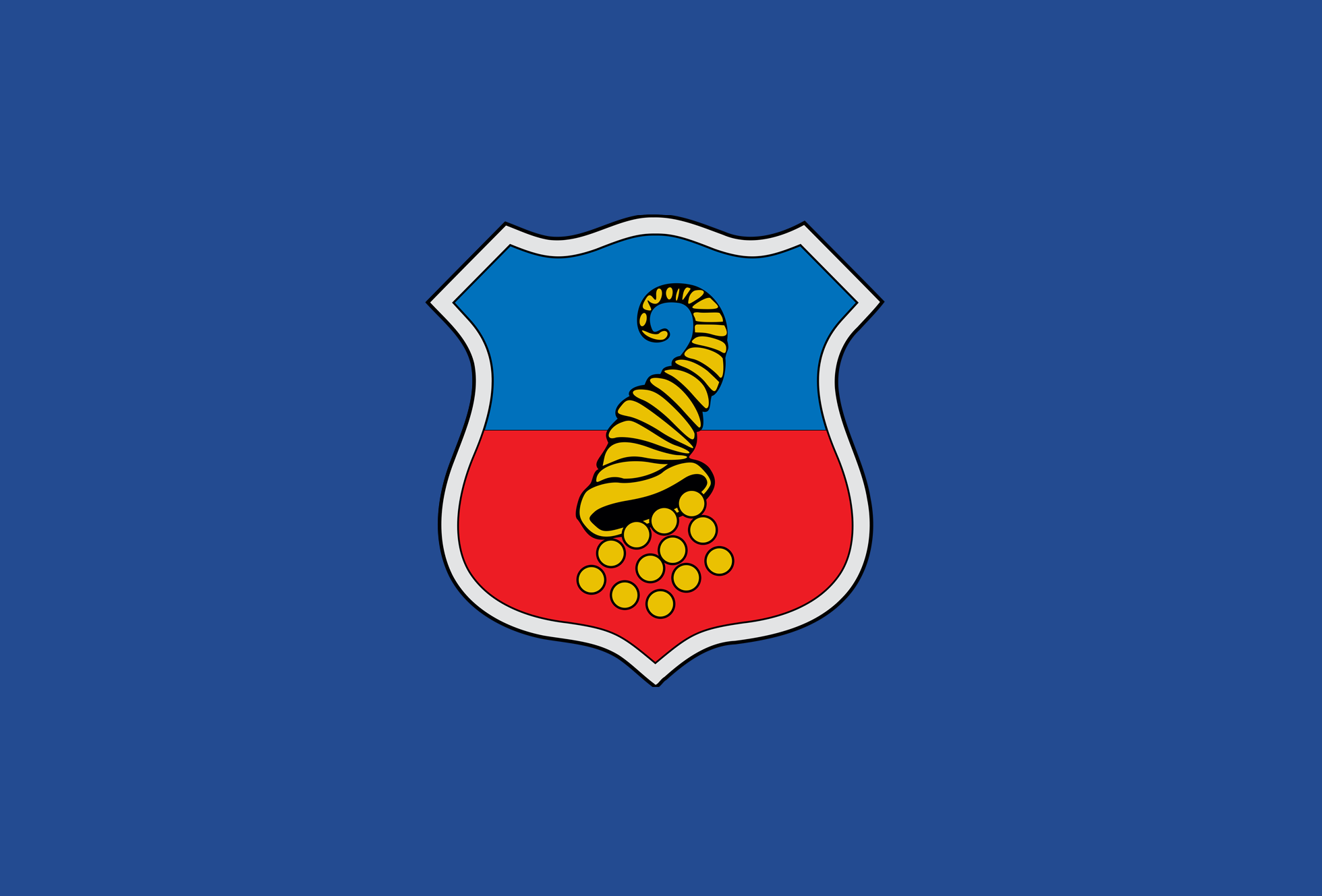
Copiapó

Coquimbo

Corral

Coyhaique

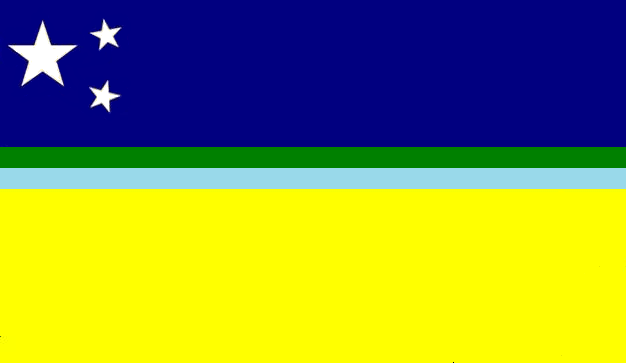
Dichato

El Monte

Florida

Futaleufú

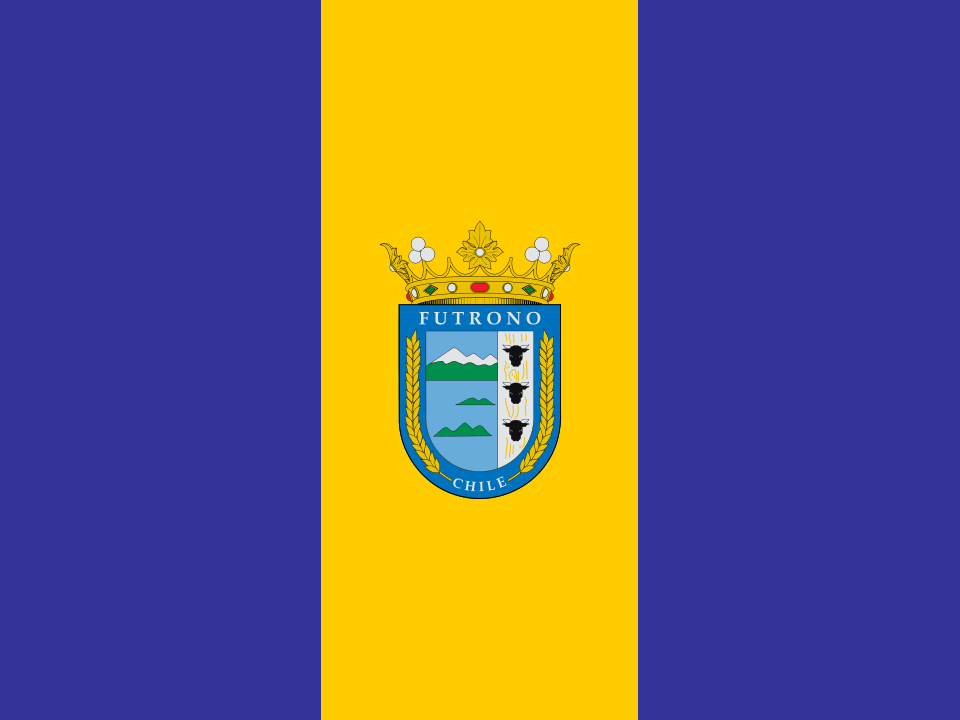
Futrono

Gorbea

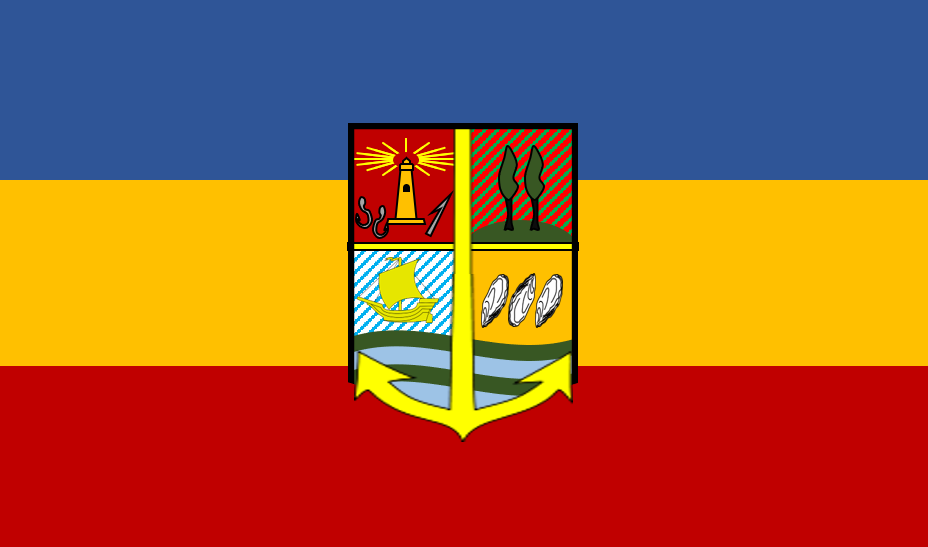
Guaitecas

Hualqui

Huasco

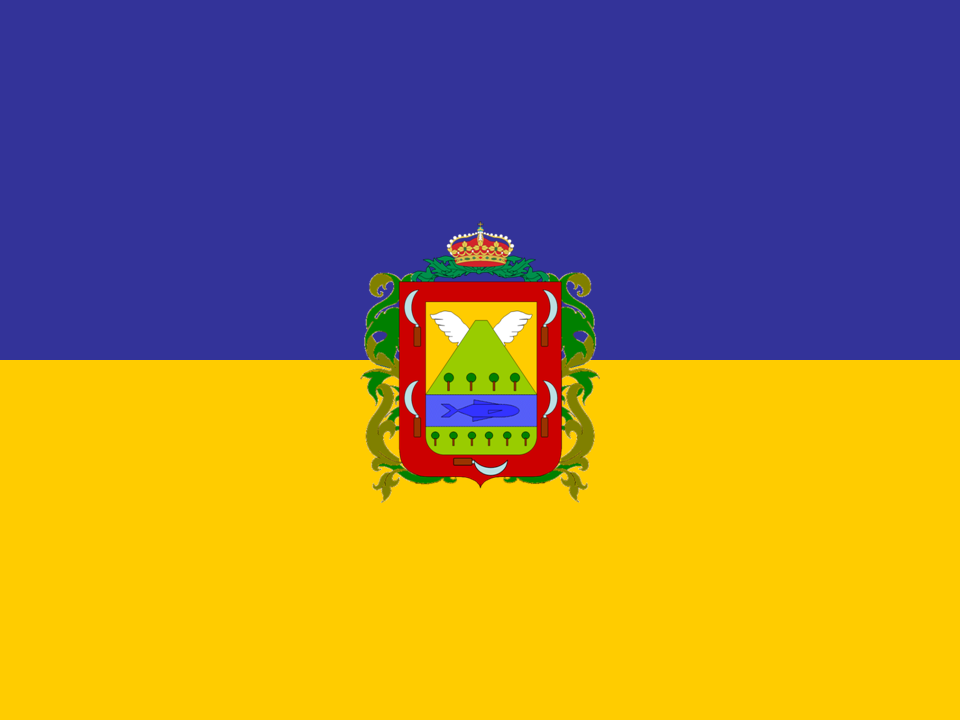
Illapel

Independencia

Iquique

Isla de Maipo

Juan Fernández

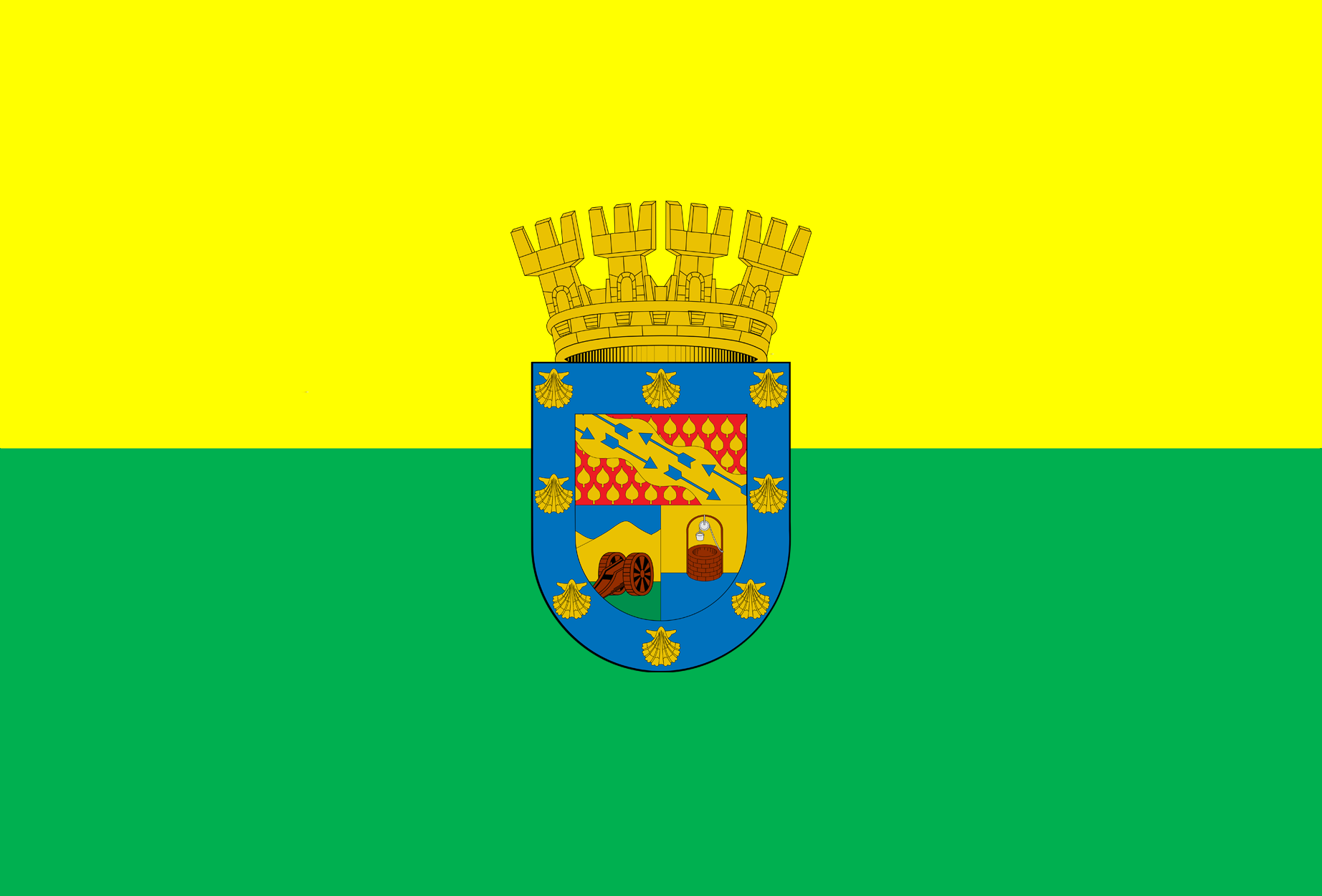
La Cisterna

La Florida

La Pintana

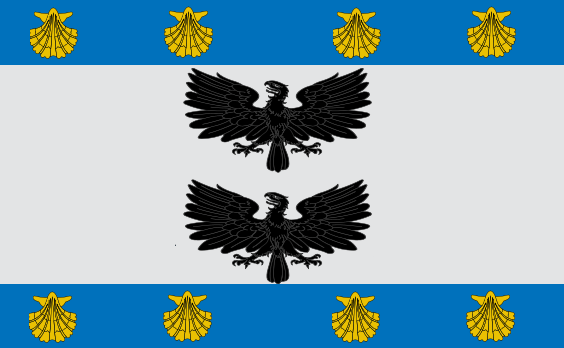
La Reina

La Serena

La Unión

Linares

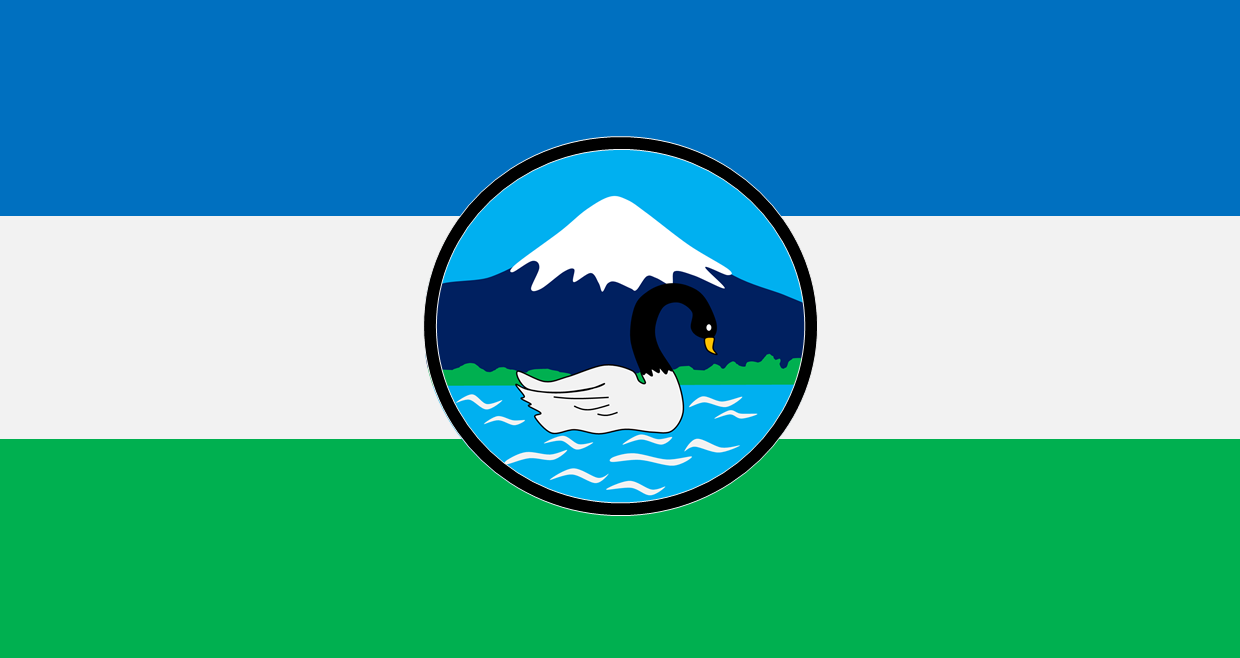
Llanquihue

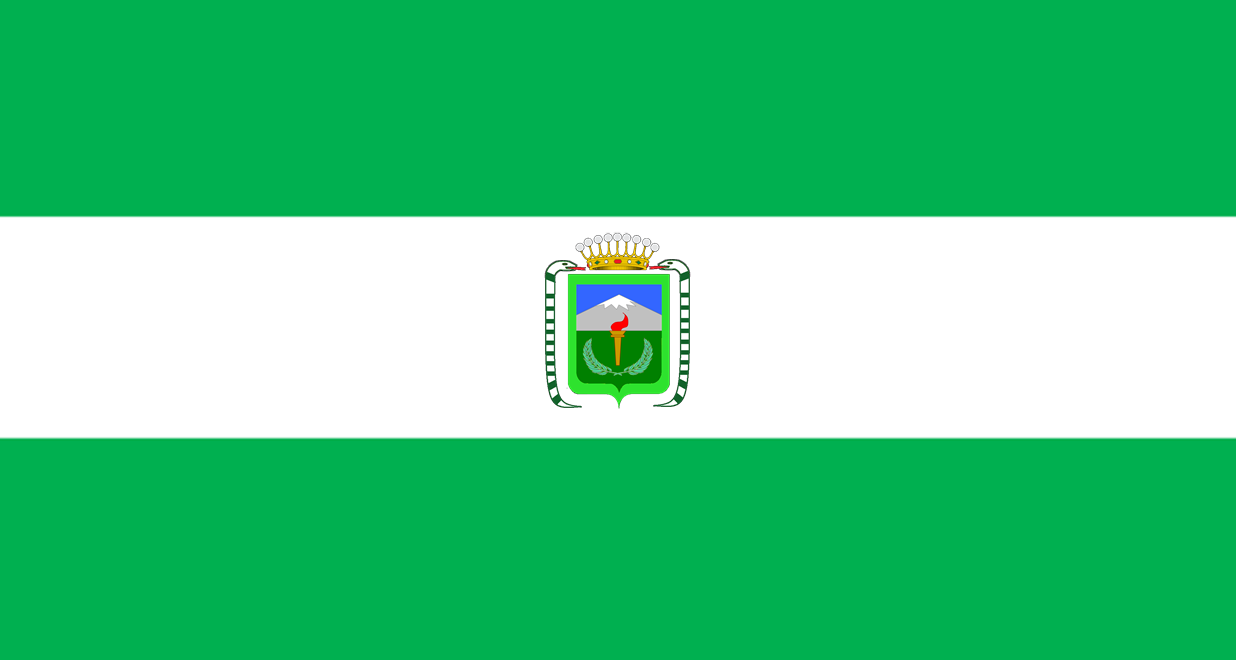
Longaví

Lo Prado

Los Ángeles

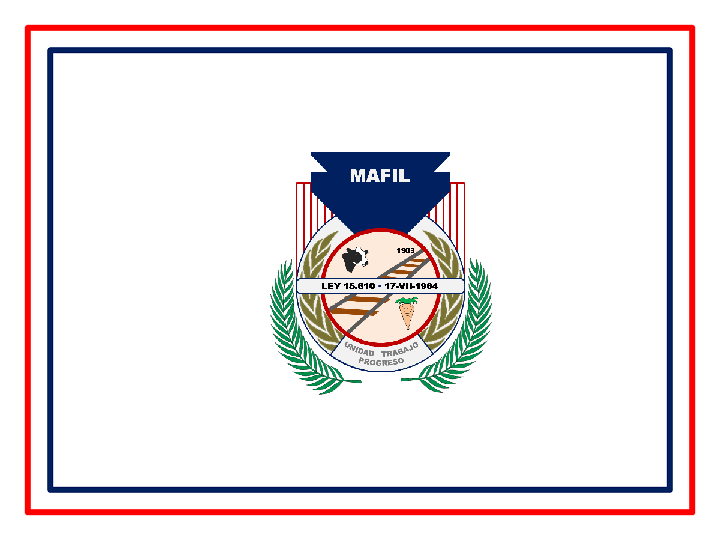
Máfil

Maipú

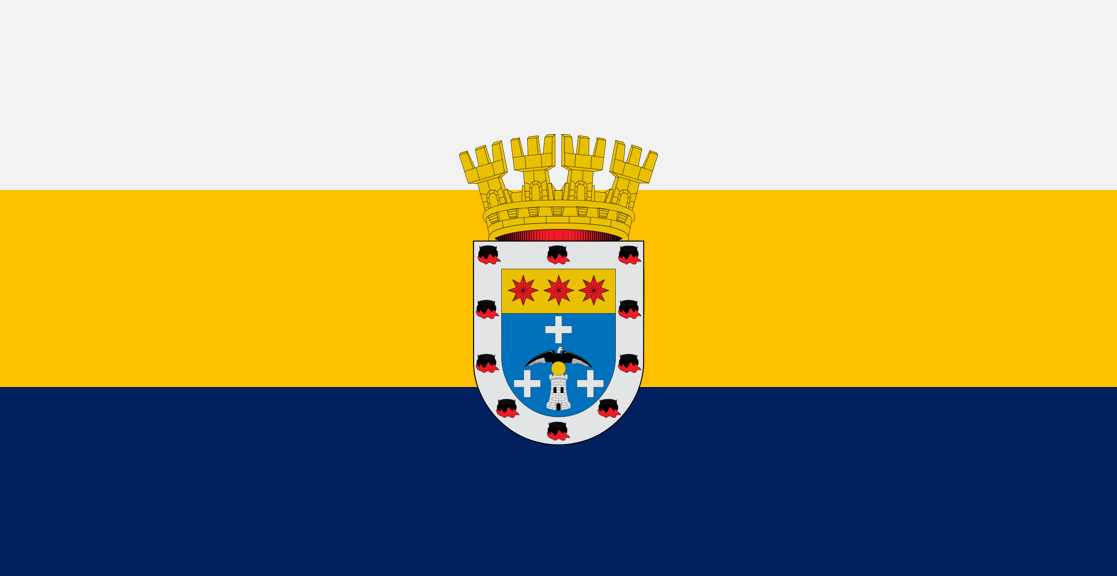
Mariquina

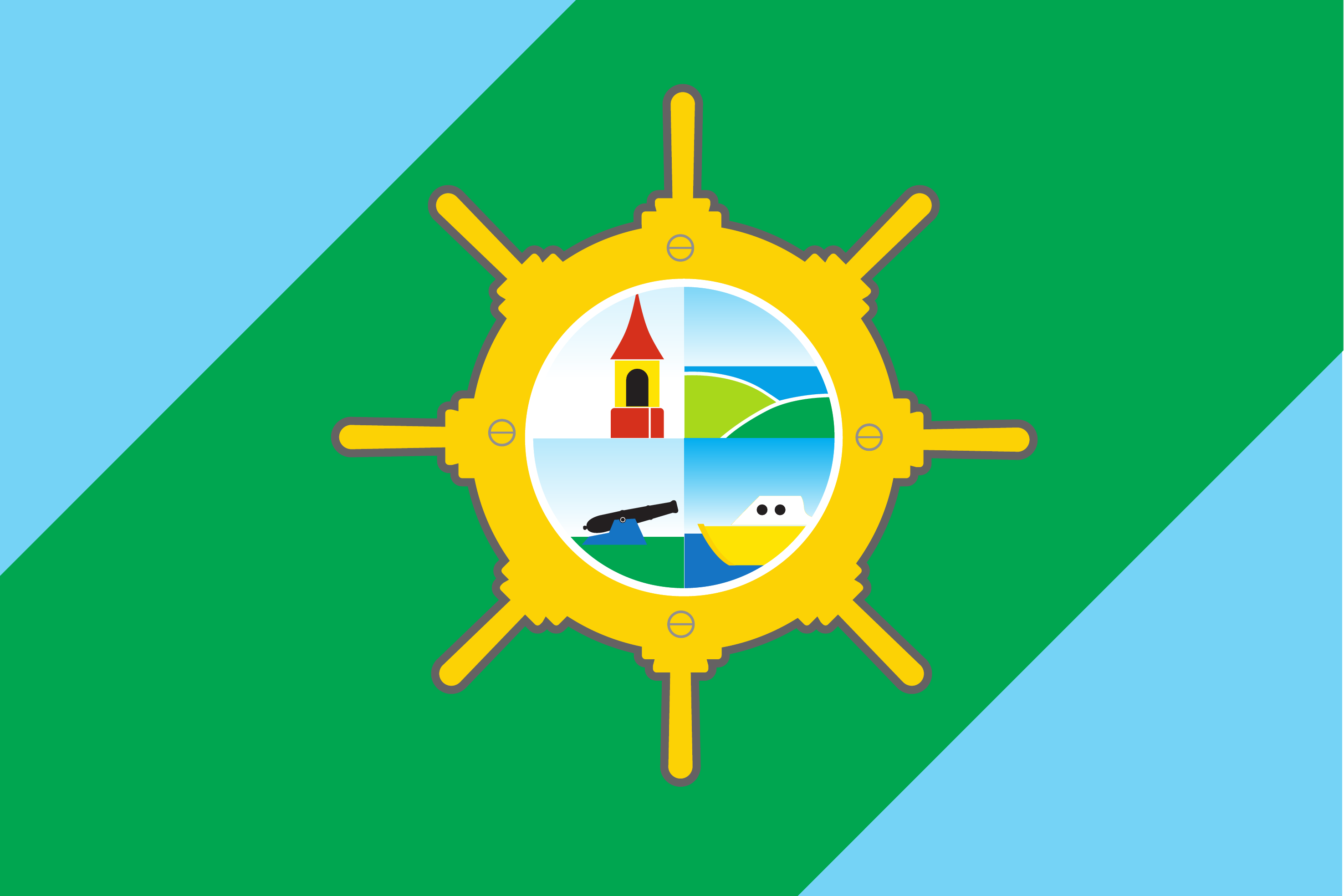
Maullín

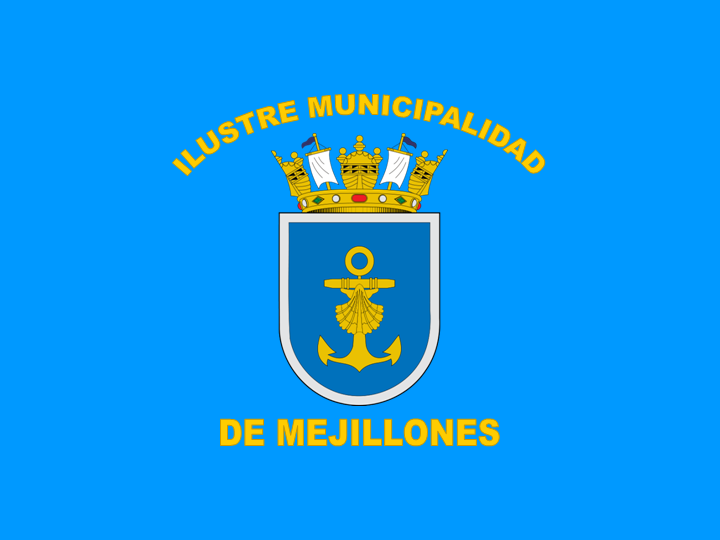
Mejillones

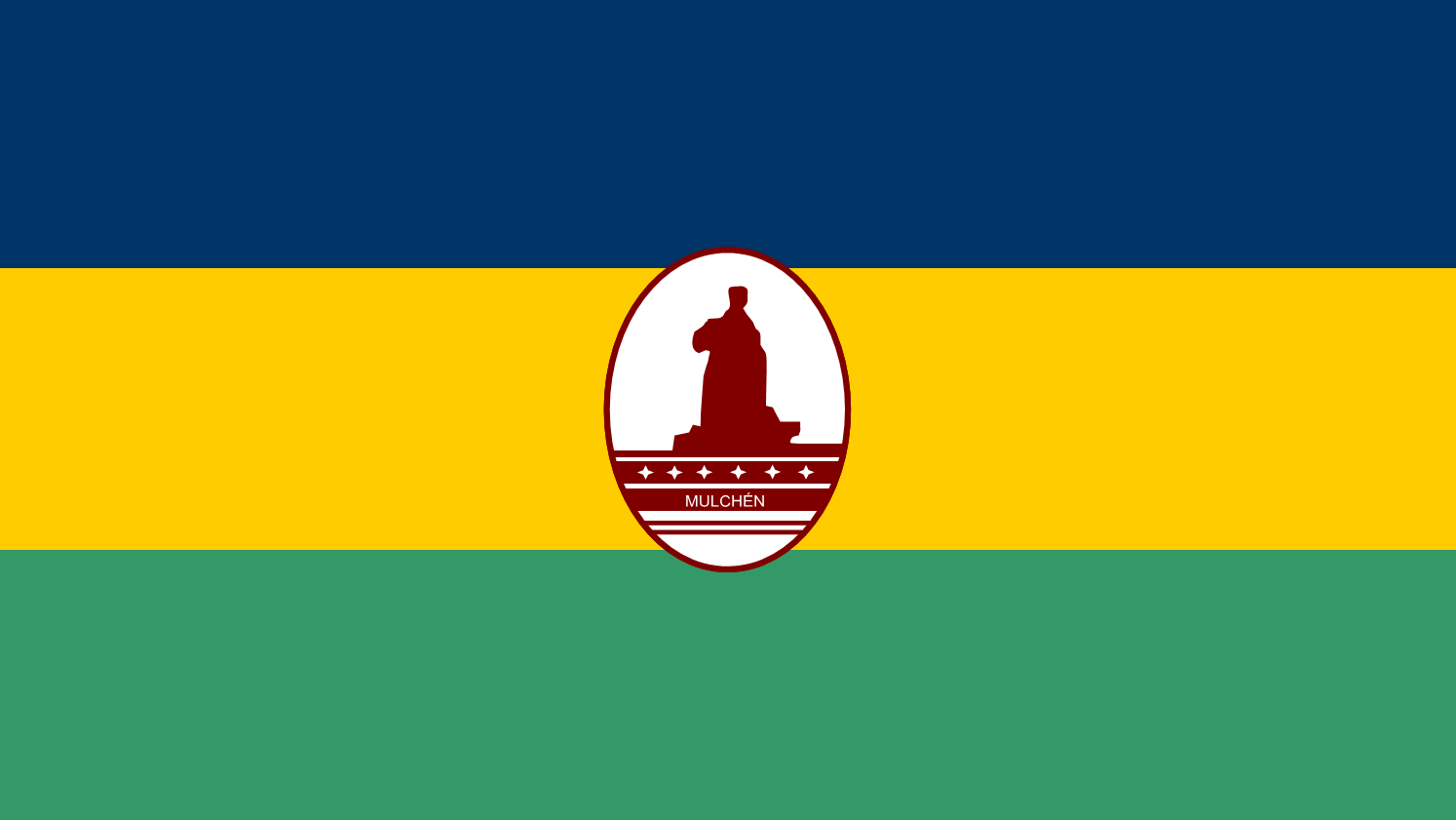
Mulchén

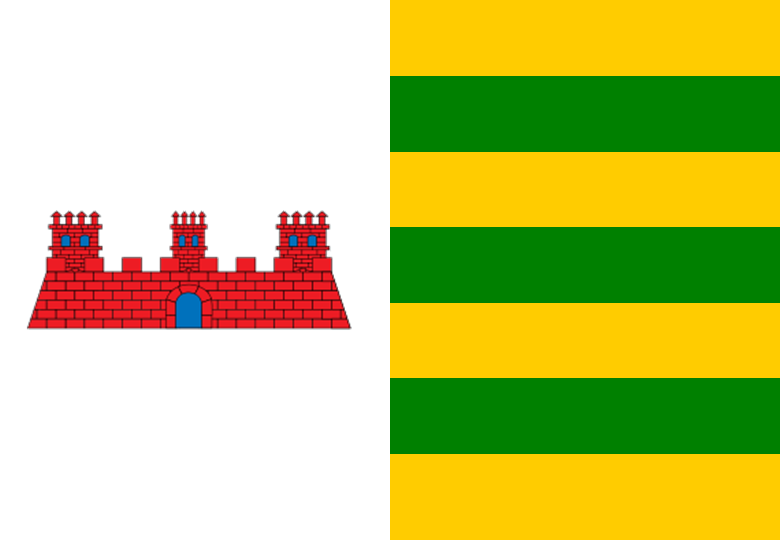
Nacimiento

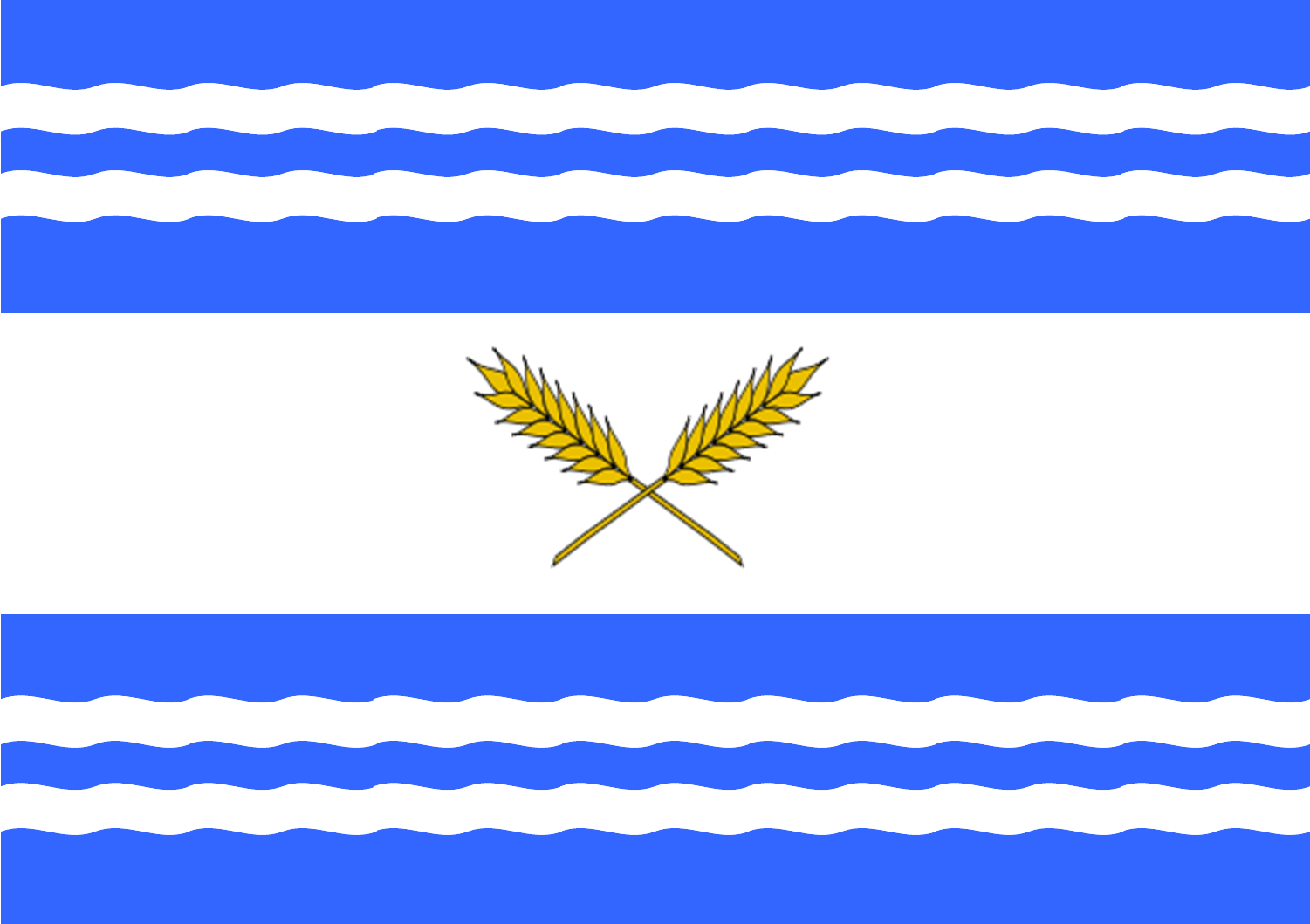
Ñiquén

Ñuñoa

Osorno

Ovalle

Paine

Panguipulli

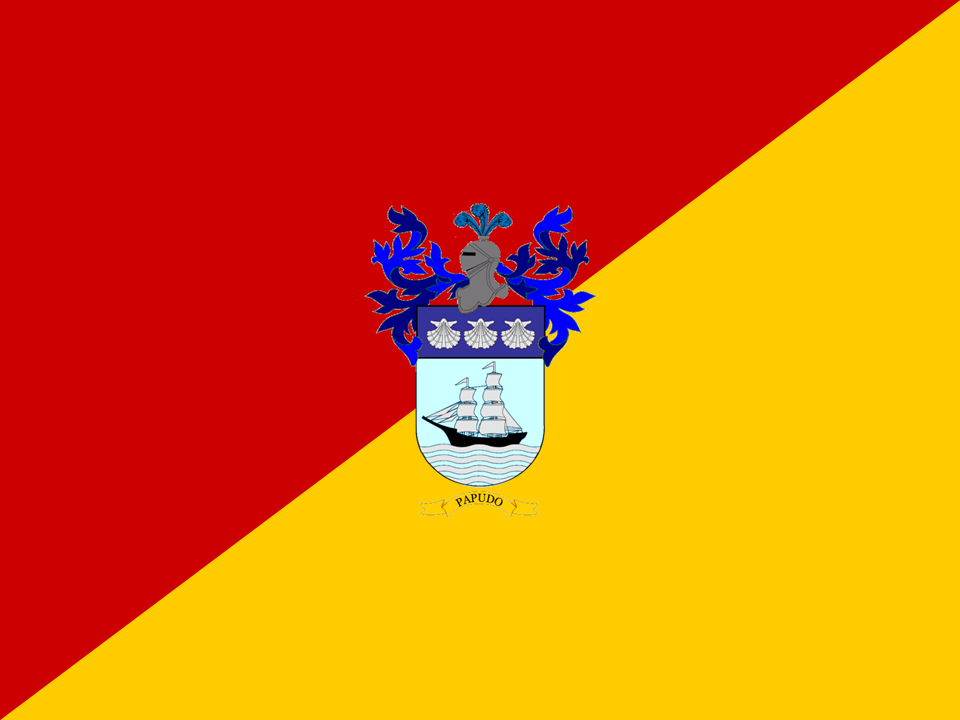
Papudo

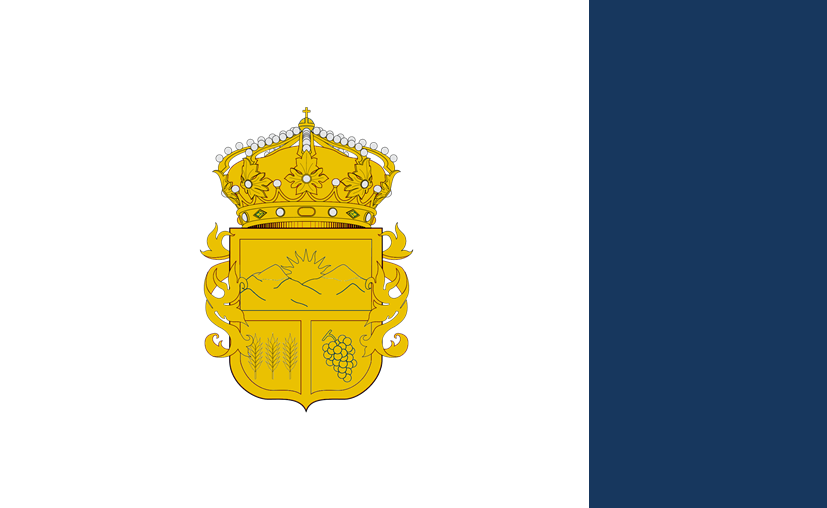
Parral

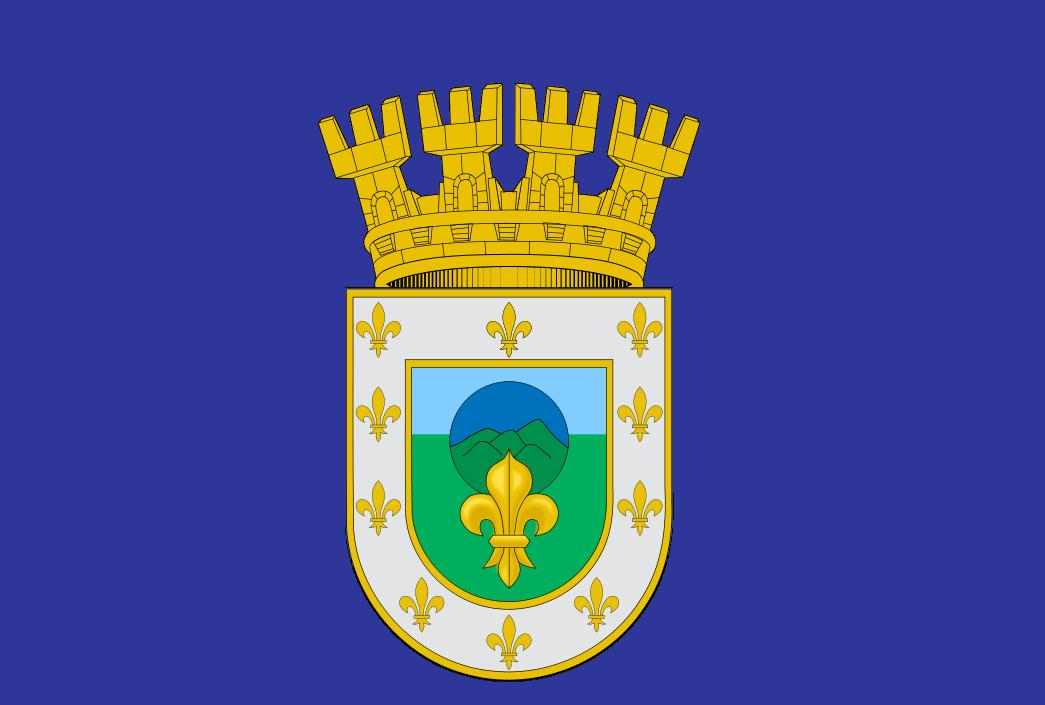
Peñaflor

Peumo

Pichilemu (details)

Placilla

Pucón

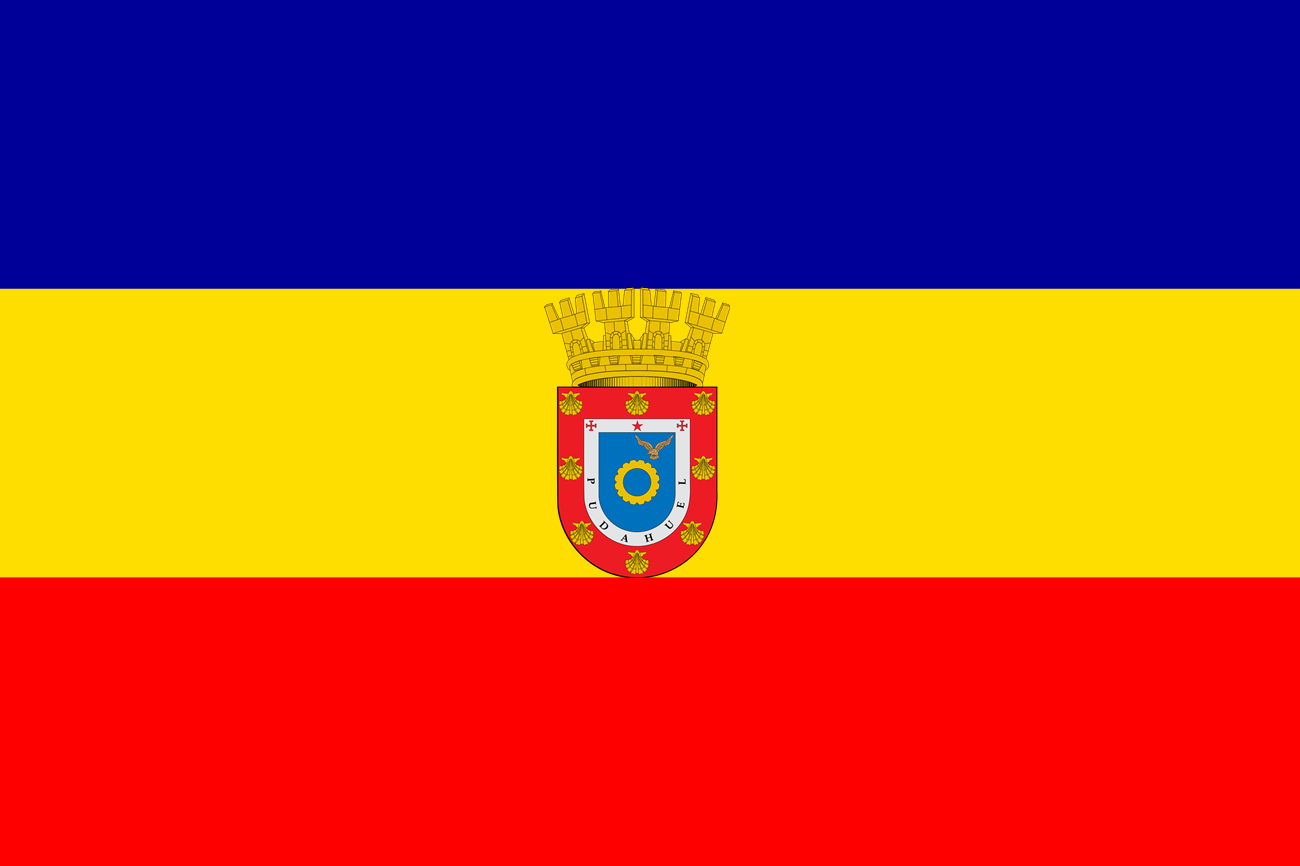
Pudahuel

Puerto Montt

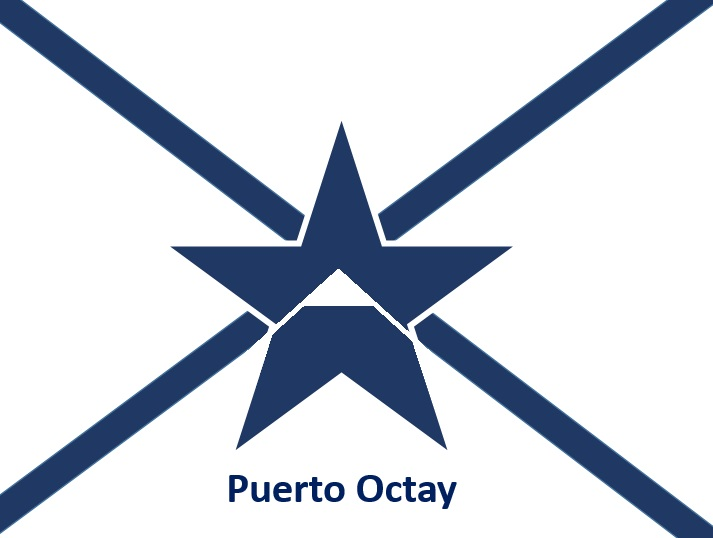
Puerto Octay

Puerto Varas

Puerto Williams

Putre

Quilicura

Quirihue

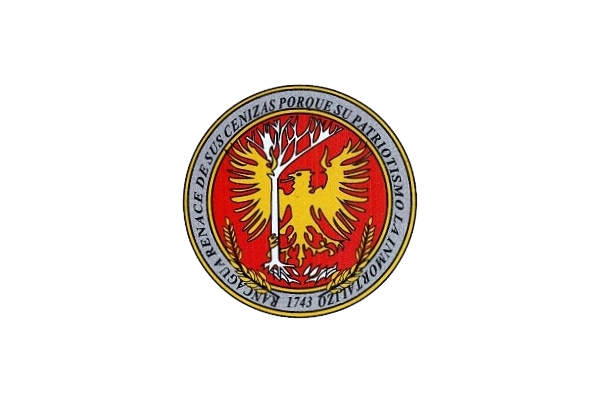
Rancagua

Renca

Requínoa

Río Bueno

Salamanca

San Bernardo

San Felipe

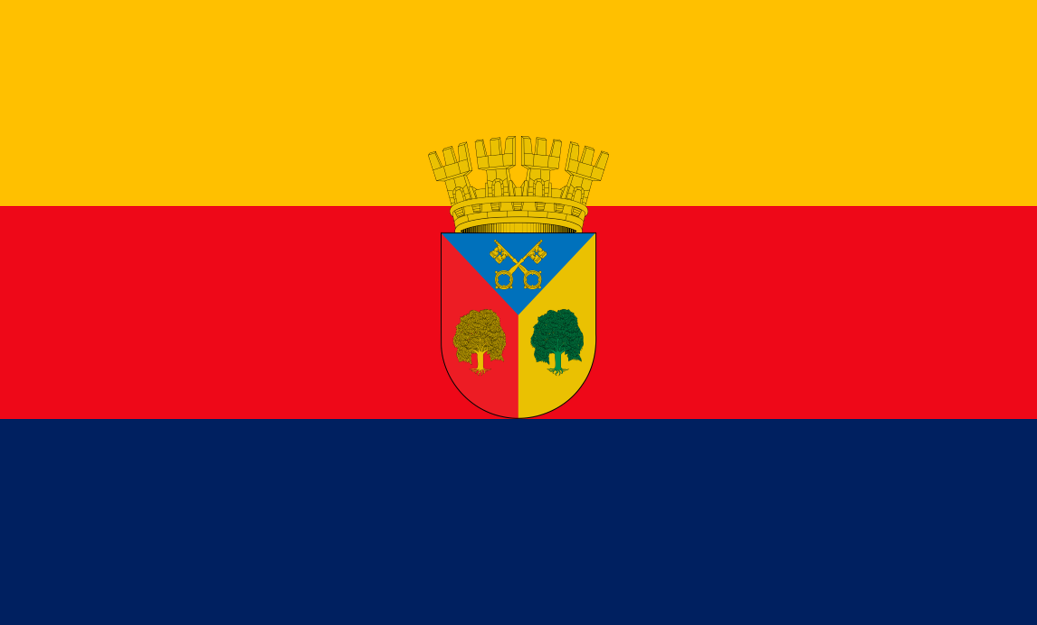
San Pedro

San Ramón

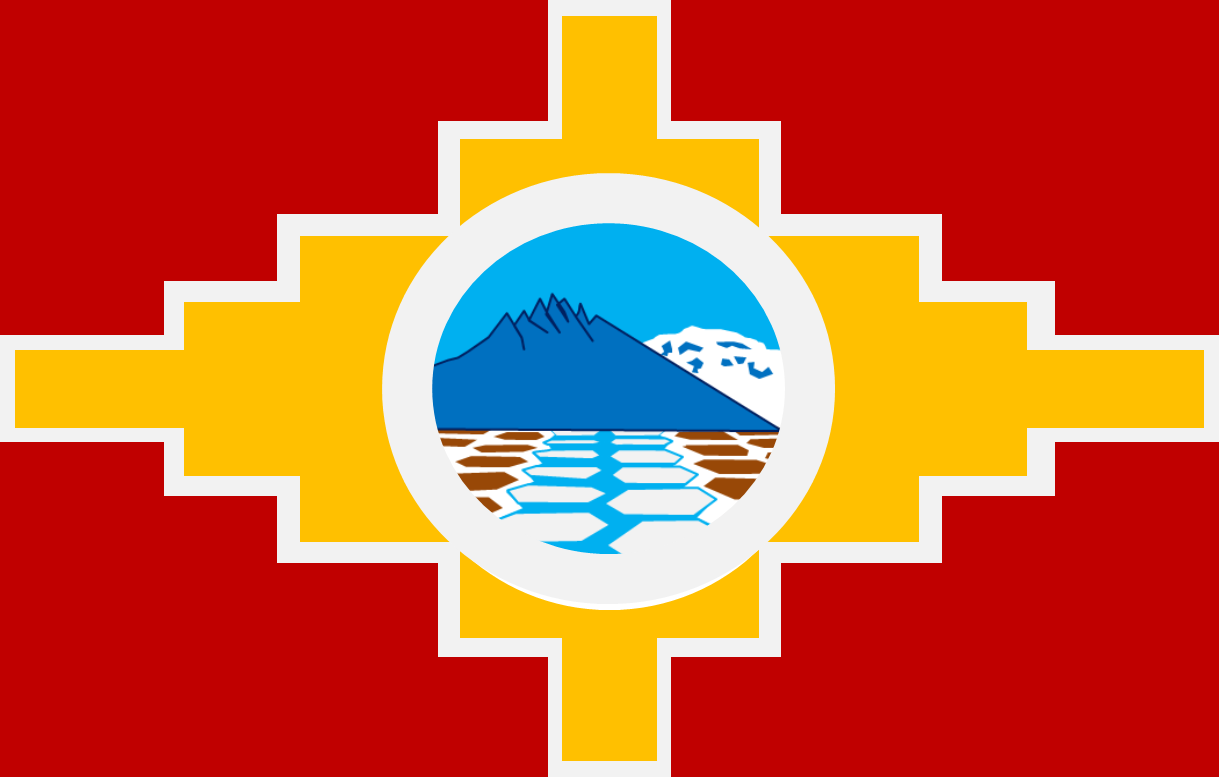
Santa Bárbara

Santa Cruz

Santa Juana

Santiago

Valdivia (details)

Valparaíso

Victoria

Vilcún

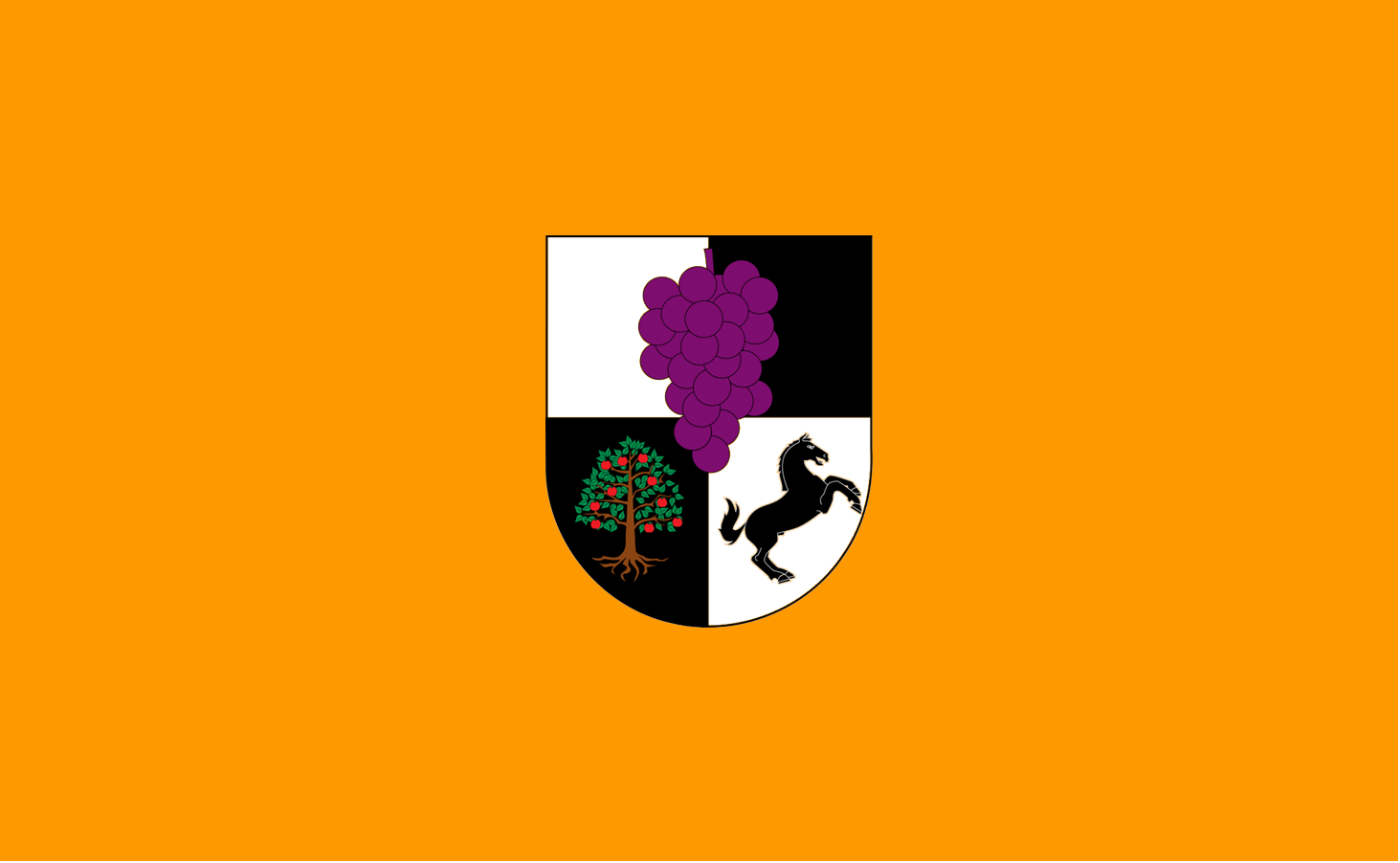
Villa Alegre

Villa Alemana

Viña del Mar

Yerbas Buenas

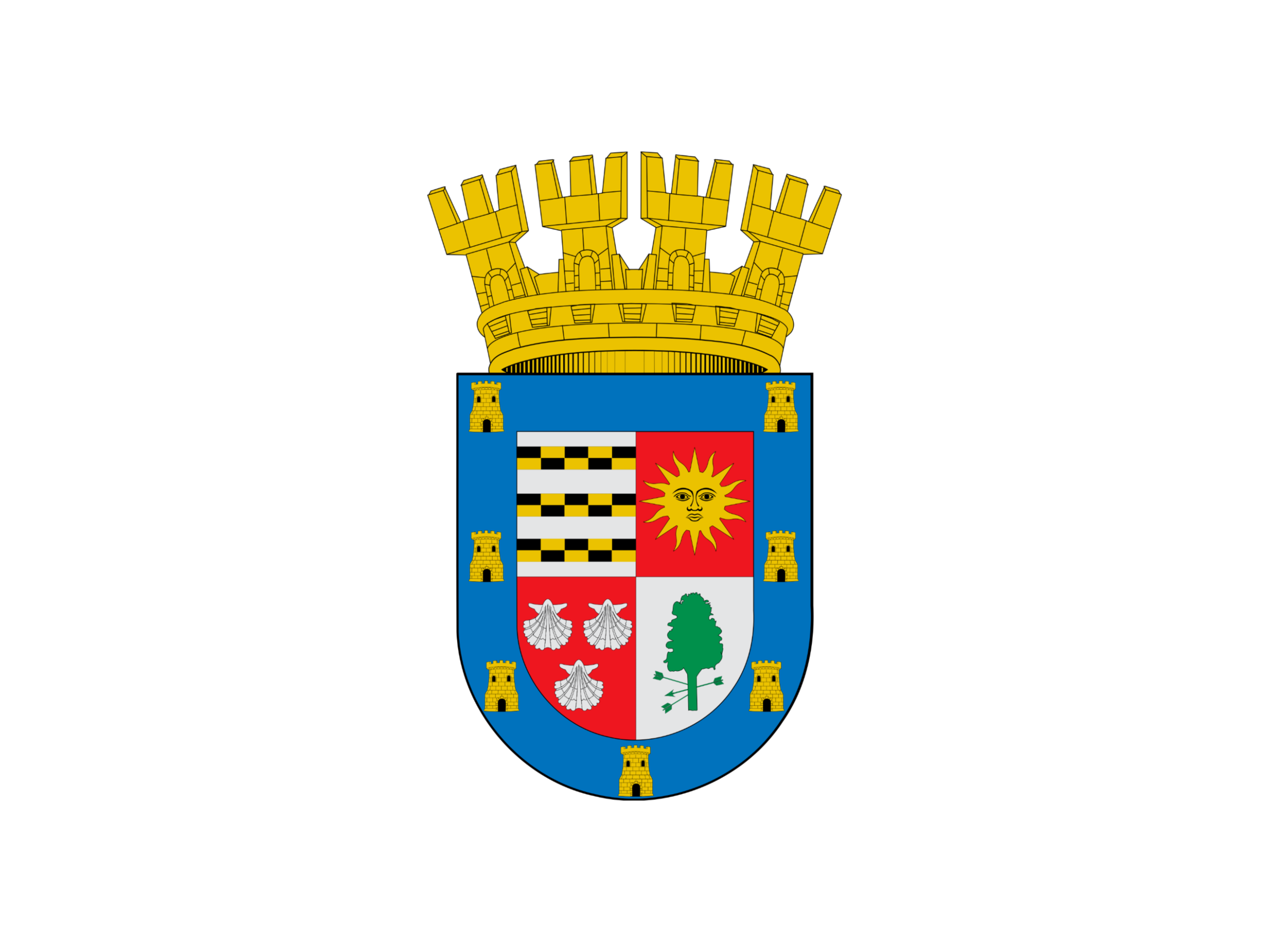
Yumbel

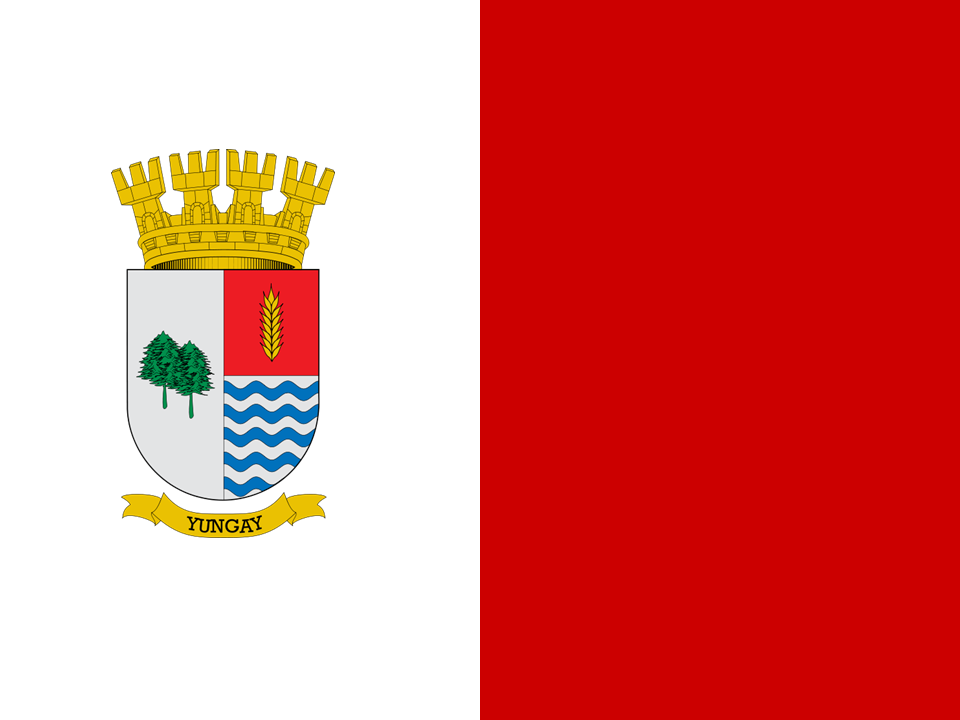
Yungay

Zapallar

== Colombia ==
Acacías

Apartadó

Arauca

Arjona

Armenia

Ayapel

Baranoa

Barbosa

Barrancabermeja

Barranquilla

Bello

Bogotá (details)

Bucaramanga

Buenaventura

Buga

Cajicá

Calarcá

Caldas

Candelaria

Carepa

Cartagena de Indias

Cartago

Caucasia

Cereté

Chía

Chigorodó

Chinchiná

Chiquinquirá

Ciénaga

Ciénaga de Oro

Copacabana

Corozal

Dosquebradas

Duitama

El Bagre

El Banco

El Carmen de Bolívar

El Cerrito

El Espinal

Envigado

Facatativá

Florencia

Florida

Floridablanca

Fundación

Funza

Fusagasugá

Garzón

Girardot

Girardota

Granada

Guarne

Ibagué

Ipiales

Itagüí

Jamundí

La Ceja

La Dorada

La Estrella

La Plata

Los Patios

Madrid

Magangué

Maicao

Malambo

Manaure

Manizales

Marinilla

Medellín

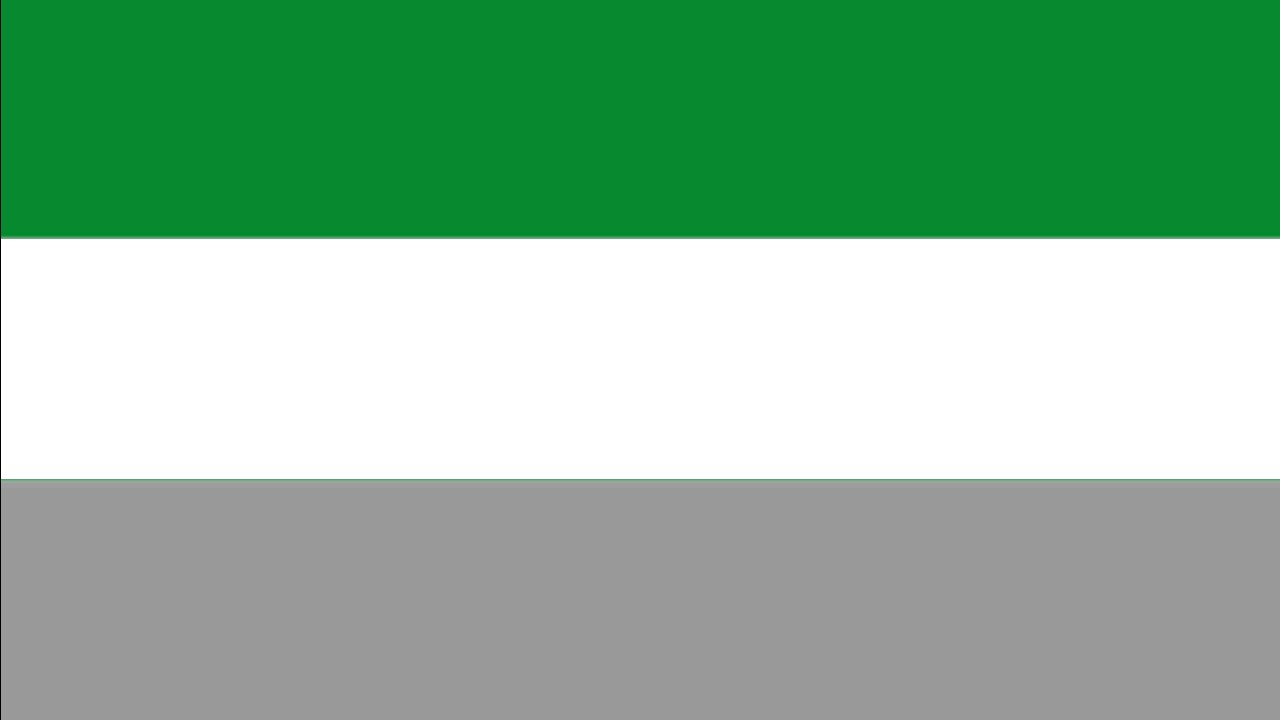
Montelíbano

Montería

Mosquera

Necoclí

Neiva

Ocaña

Orito

Palmira

Pamplona

Pereira

Piedecuesta

Pitalito

Planeta Rica

Plato

Popayán

Pradera

Puerto Asís

Puerto Boyacá

Puerto Libertador

Quibdó

Riohacha

Rionegro

Riosucio

Sabanalarga

Sabaneta

Sahagún

San José de Cúcuta

San José del Guaviare

San Juan de Girón

San Juan de Pasto

San Marcos

San Onofre

Santa Cruz de Lorica

Santa Marta

Santander de Quilichao

Santa Rosa de Cabal

Santiago de Cali

San Vicente del Caguán

Sincelejo

Soacha

Sogamoso

Soledad

Tame

Tierralta

Tuluá

Tumaco

Tunja

Turbaco

Turbo

Uribia

Valle del Guamuez

Valledupar

Villa del Rosario

Villamaría

Villavicencio

Yopal

Yumbo

Zipaquirá

Zona Bananera

=== Historical ===
Montelíbano (1990 - 2008)

== Ecuador ==
Ambato

Archidona

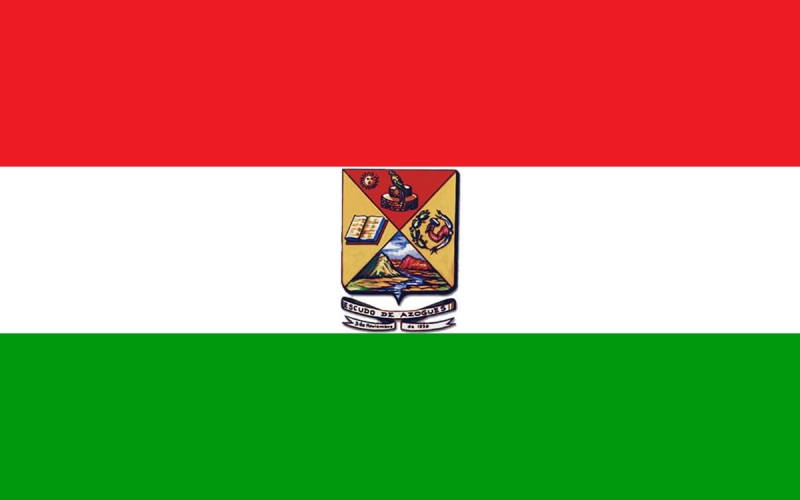
Azogues

Babahoyo

Balao

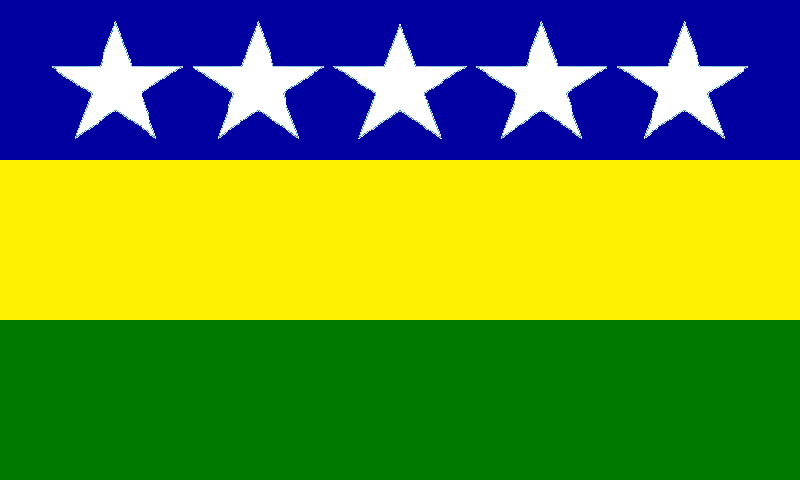
Baños de Agua Santa

Calceta

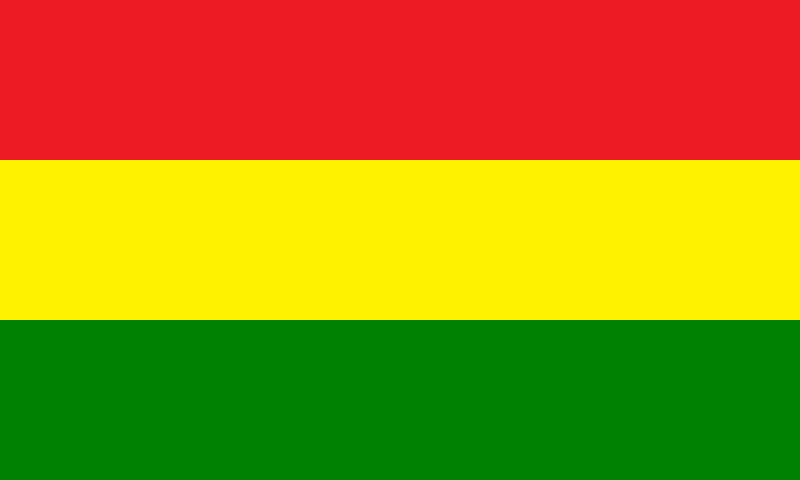
Cariamanga

Cayambe

Chone

Coca

Colimes

Cuenca

Daule

Durán

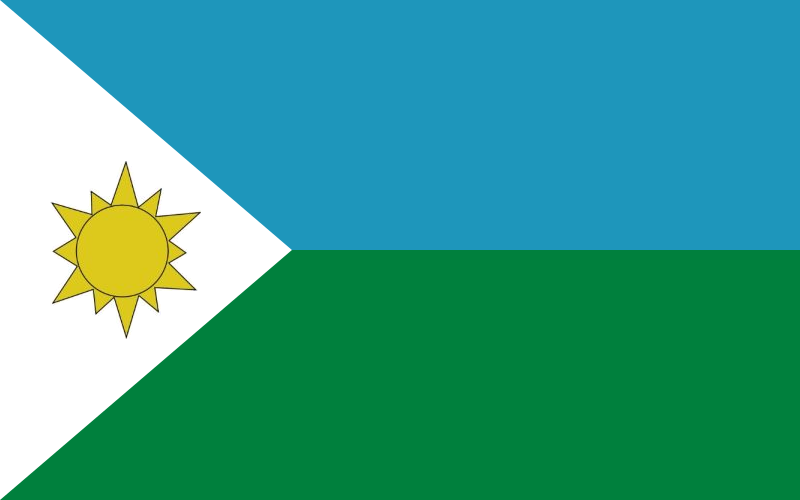
El Chaco

Esmeraldas

Guaranda

Guayaquil (details)

Huaquillas

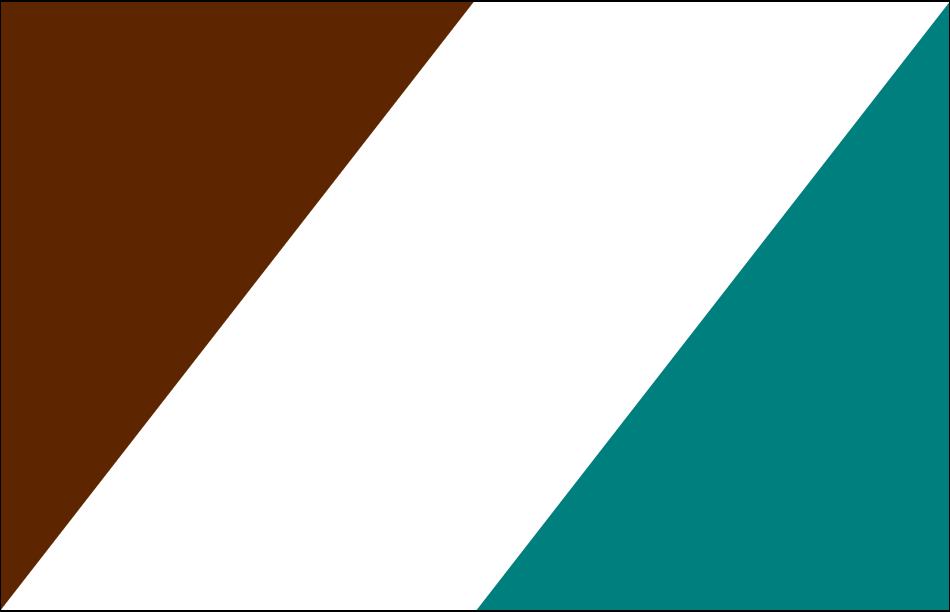
Jama

La Libertad

Latacunga

La Troncal

Loja

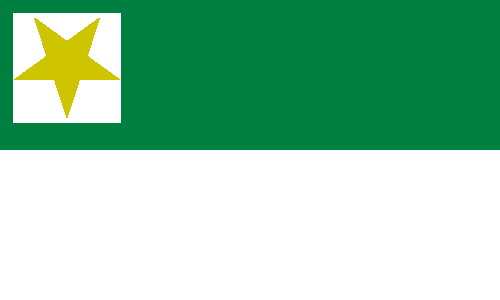
Macas

Machala

Milagro

Nueva Loja

Playas

Portoviejo

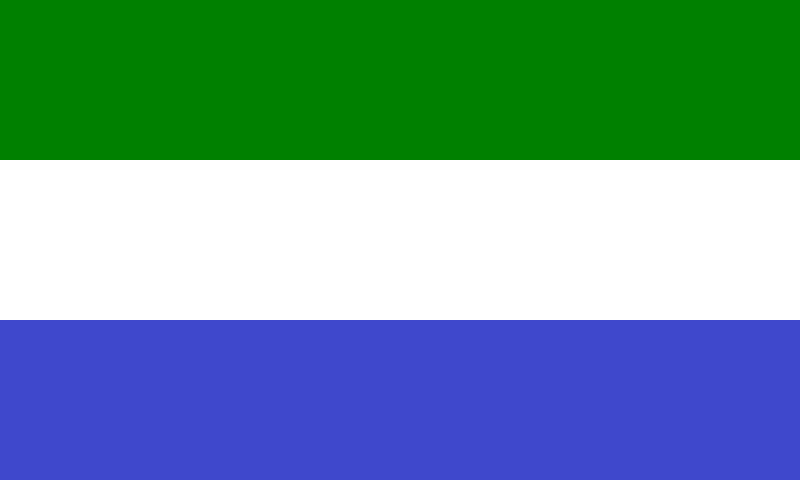
Puerto López

Quevedo

Quito (details)

Riobamba

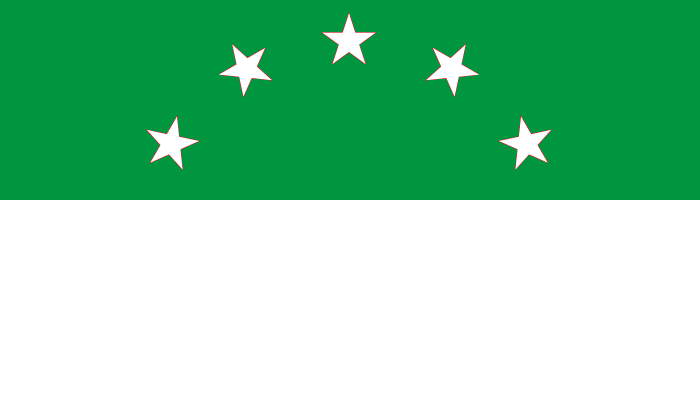
Rosa Zárate

Samborondón

Sangolquí

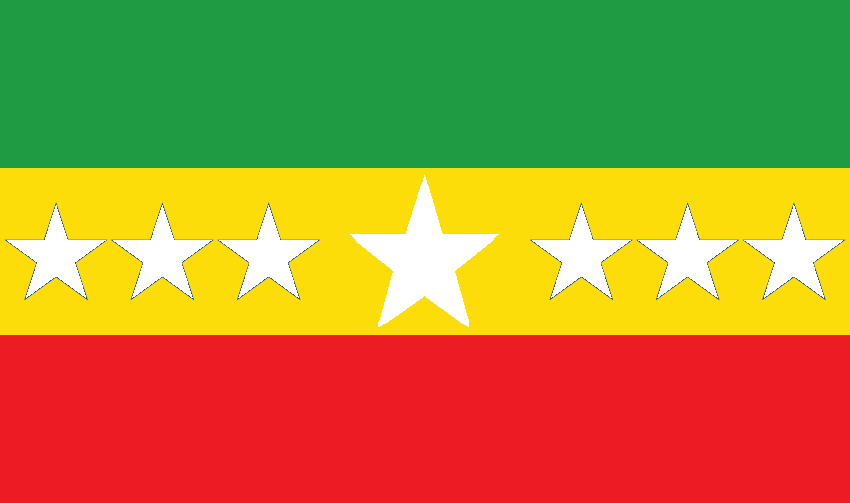
San Miguel

Santa Rosa

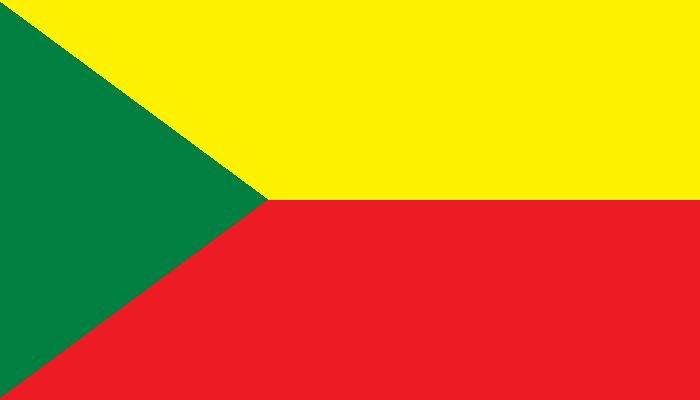
Sígsig

Tabacundo

Tosagua

Tulcán

Valencia

Ventanas

Vinces

Yaguachi

Zamora

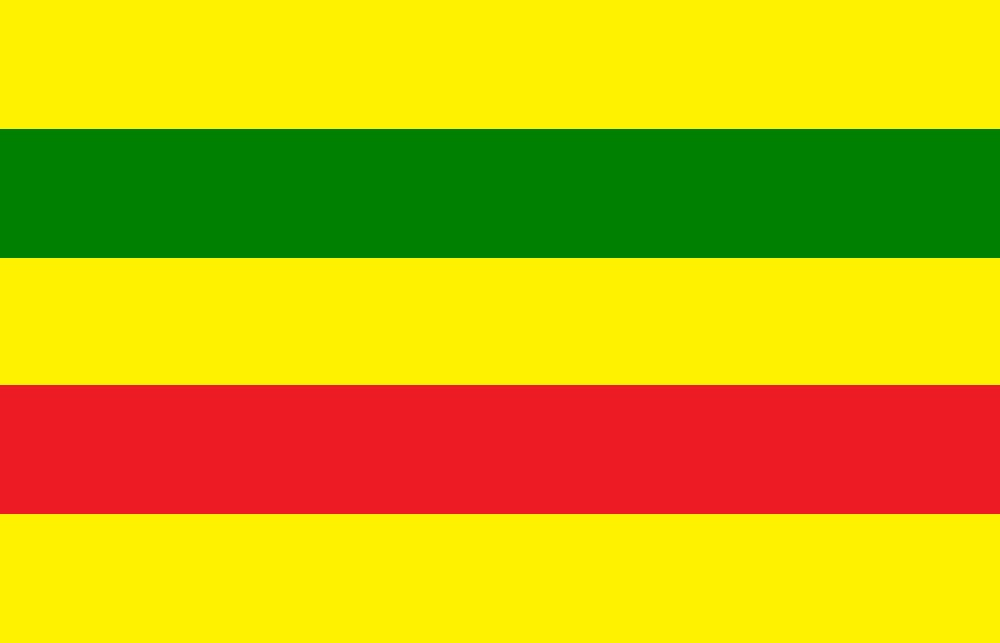
Zaruma

== French Guiana ==
Cayenne

== Guyana ==
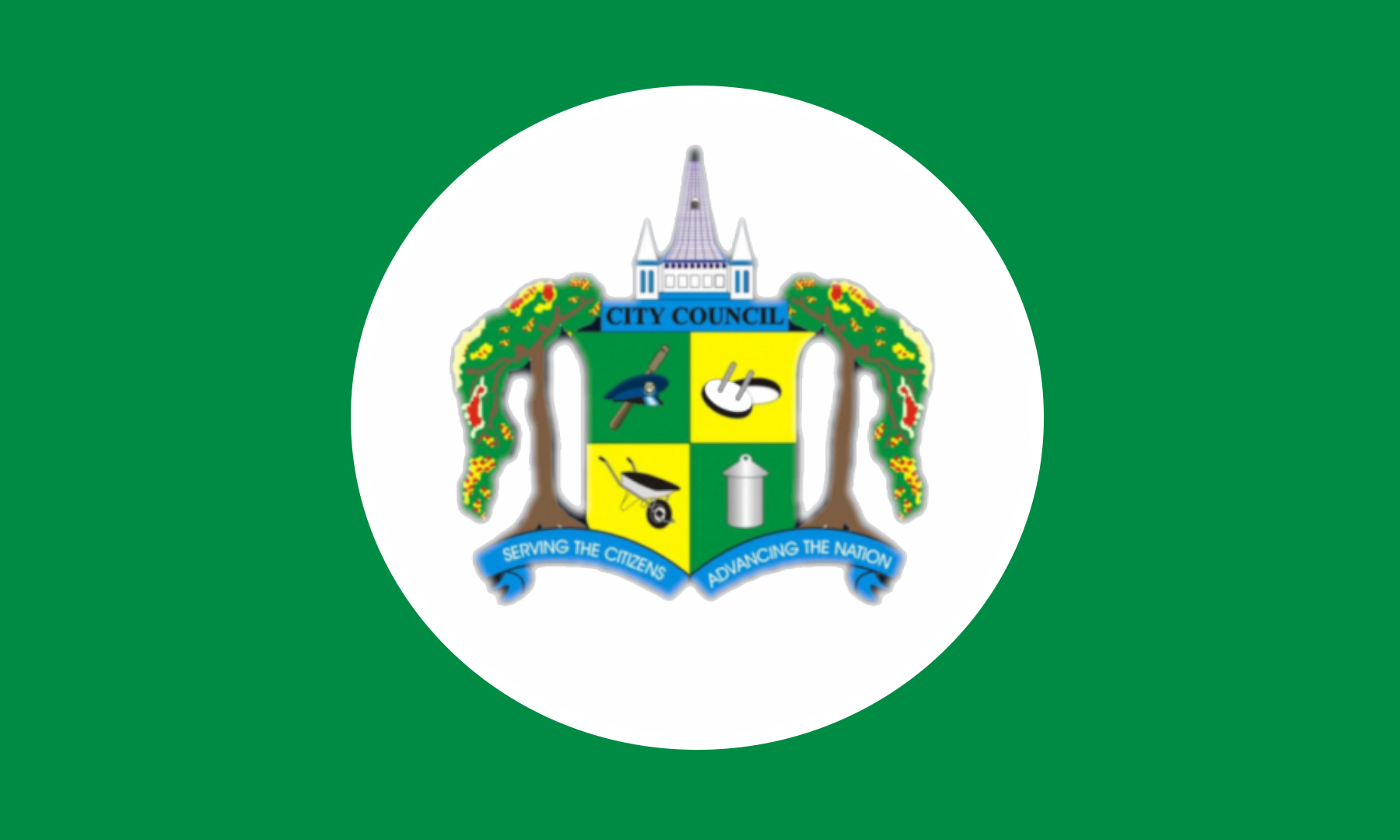
Georgetown

== Paraguay ==
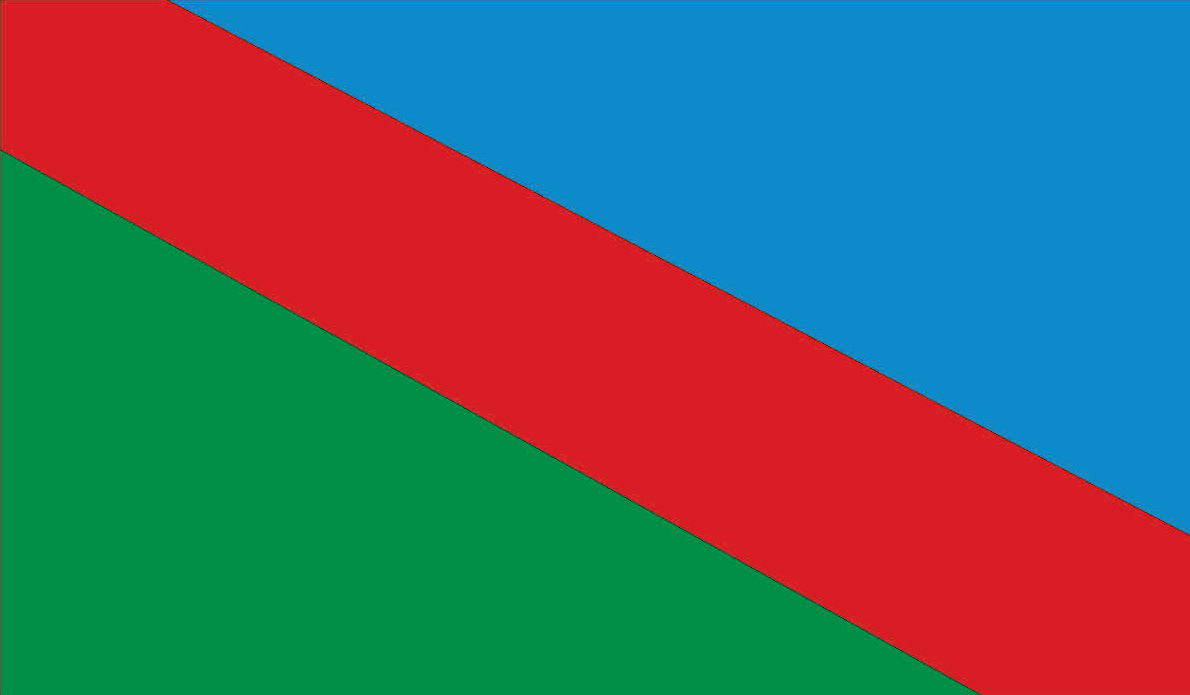
Alto Verá

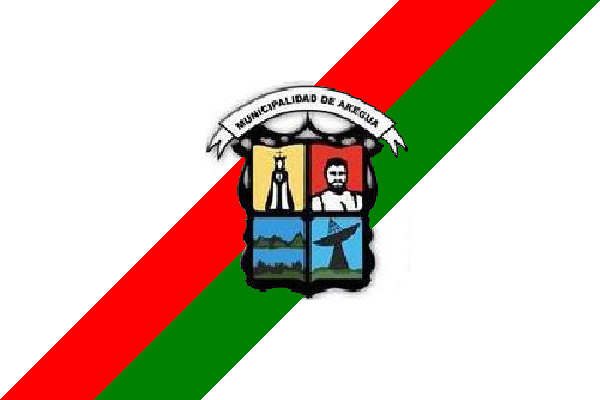
Areguá

Asunción

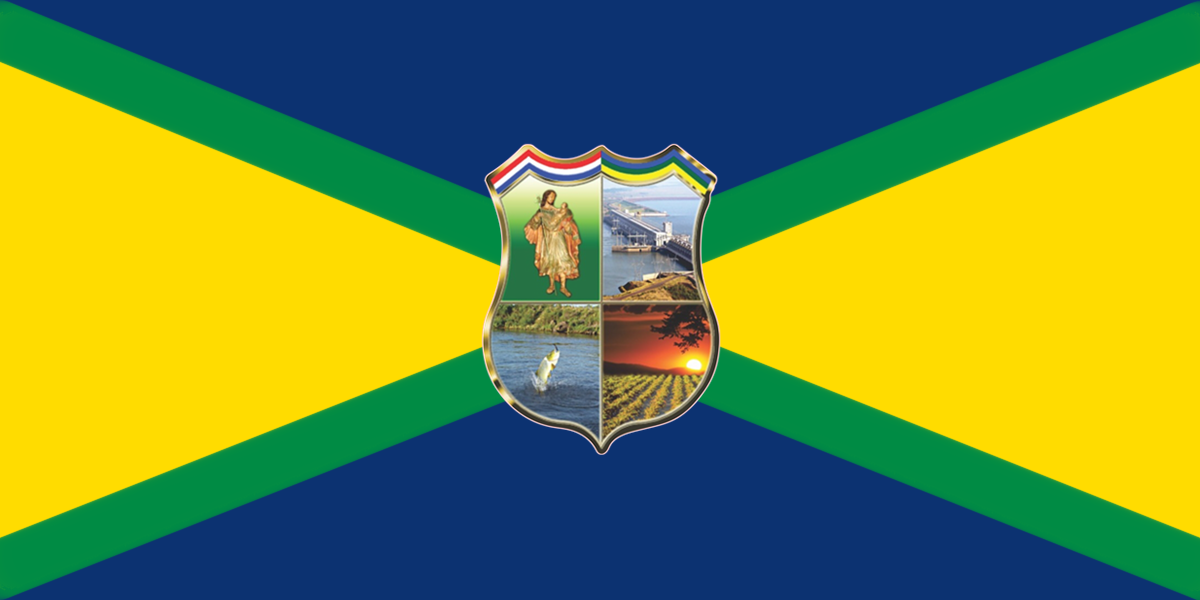
Ayolas

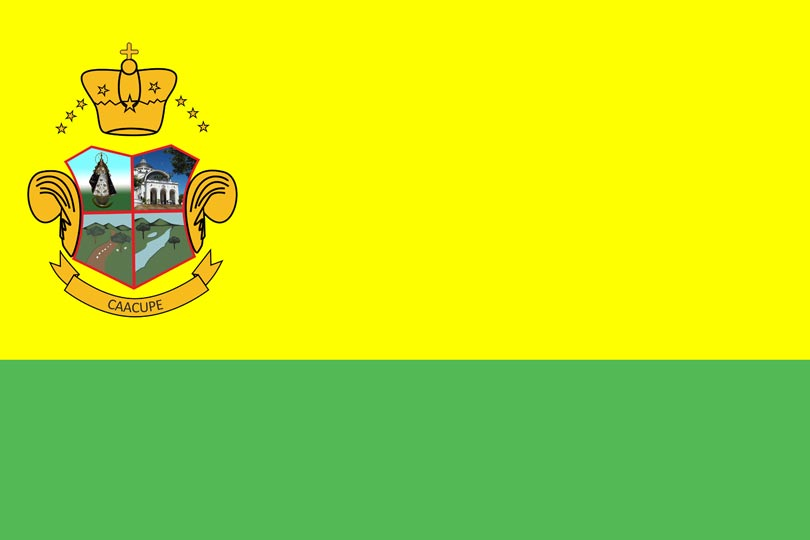
Caacupé

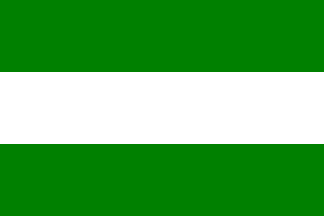
Caaguazú

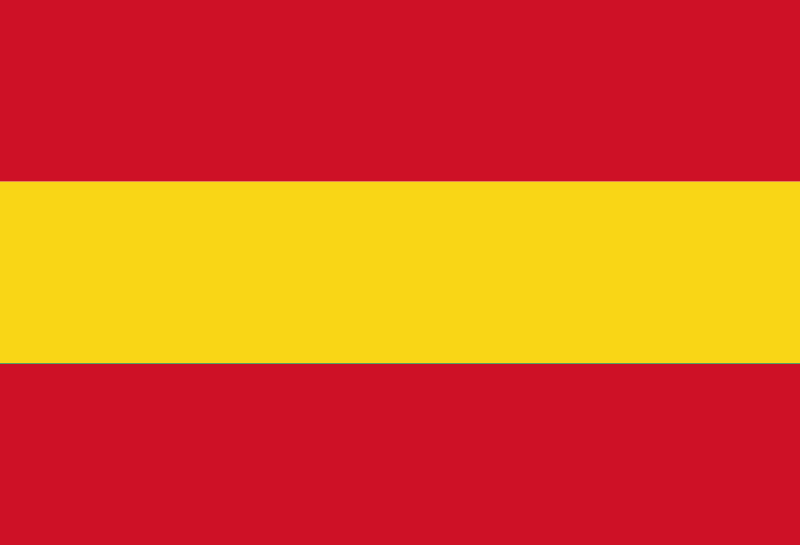
Caazapá

Caraguatay

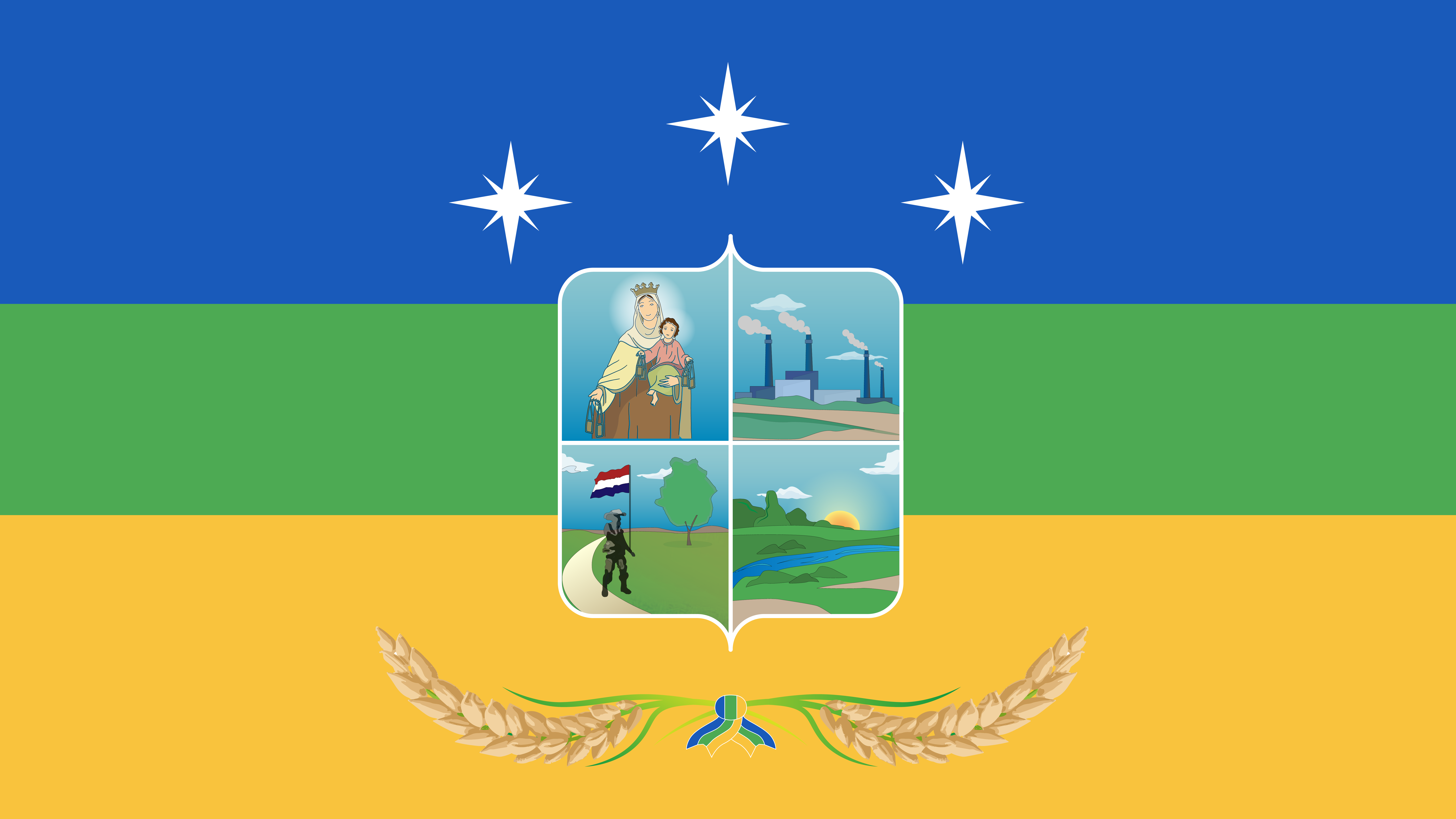
Carmen del Paraná

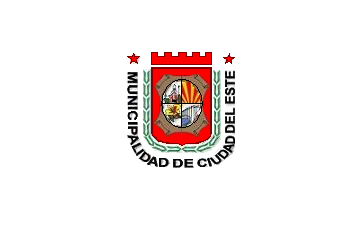
Ciudad del Este

Concepción

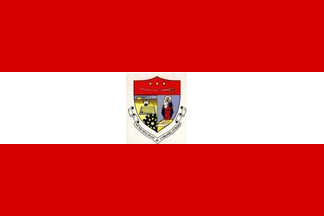
Coronel Oviedo

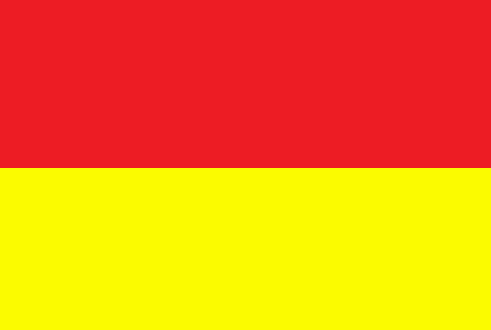
Doctor Juan León Mallorquín

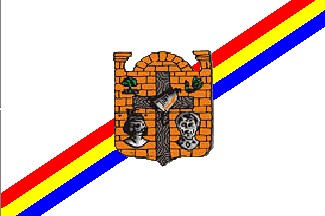
Encarnación

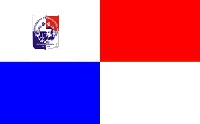
Fernando de la Mora

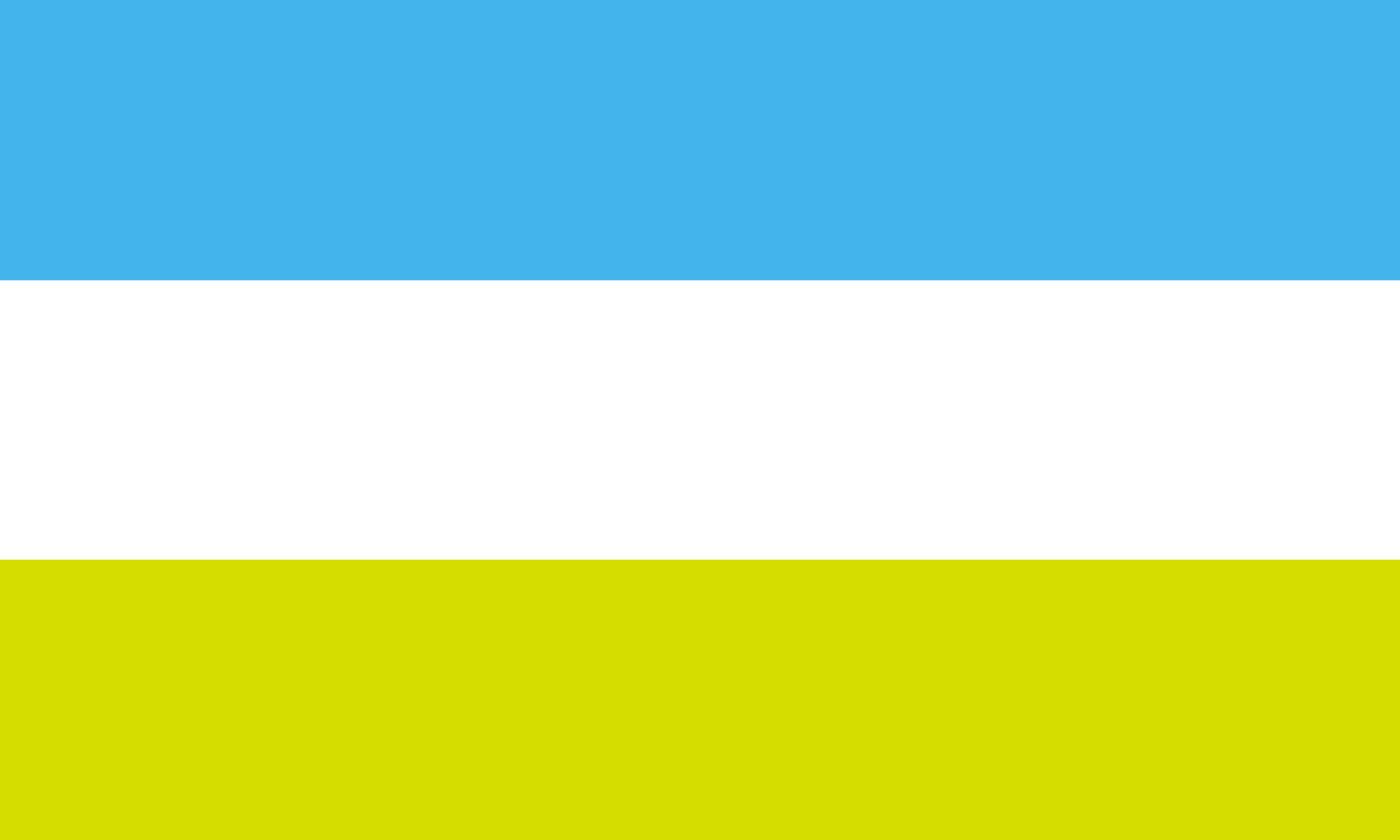
General Artigas

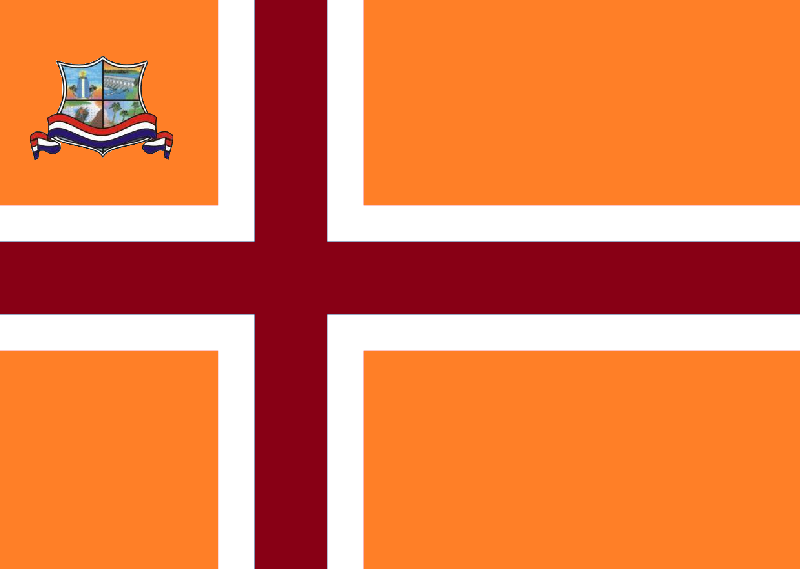
Hernandarias

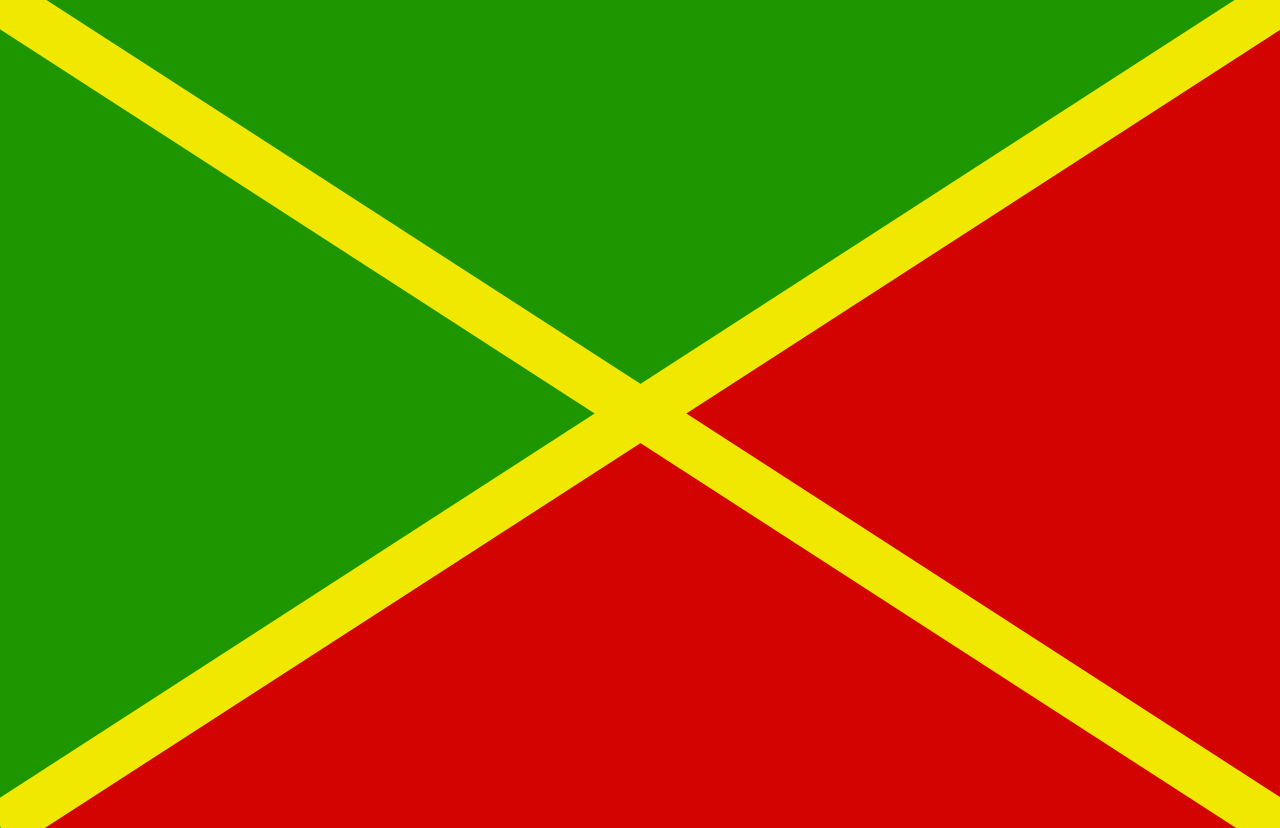
Hohenau

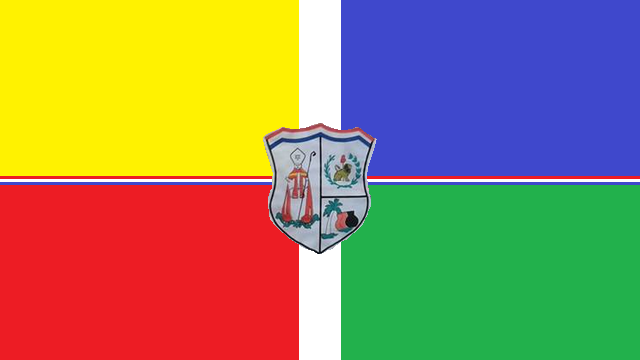
Itá

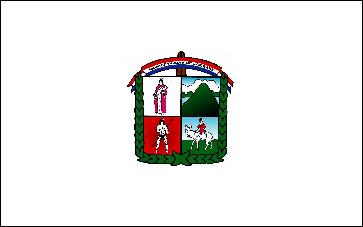
Lambaré

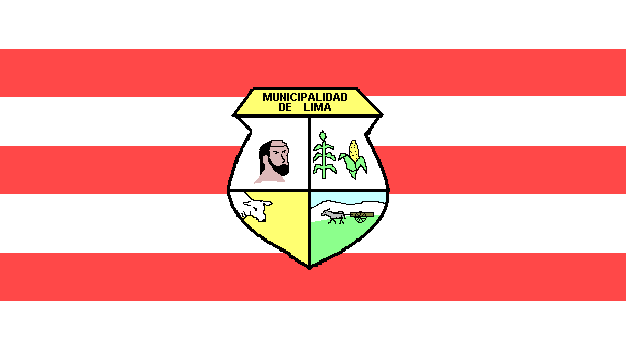
Lima

Luque

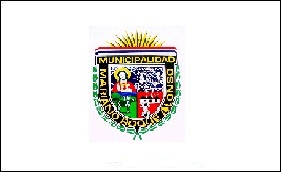
Mariano Roque Alonso

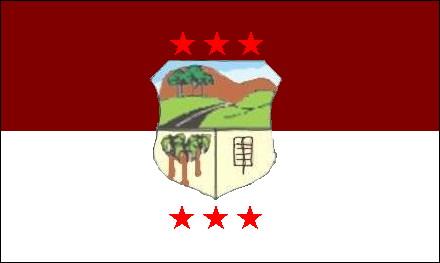
Ñemby

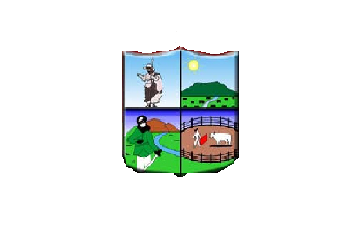
Paraguarí

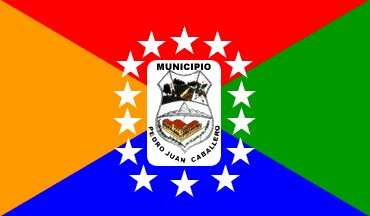
Pedro Juan Caballero

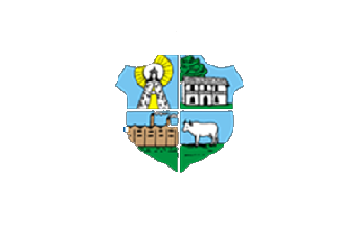
Pilar

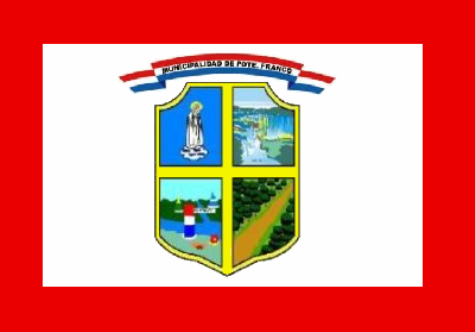
Presidente Franco

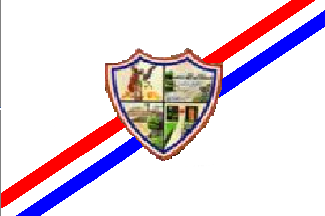
Saltos del Guairá

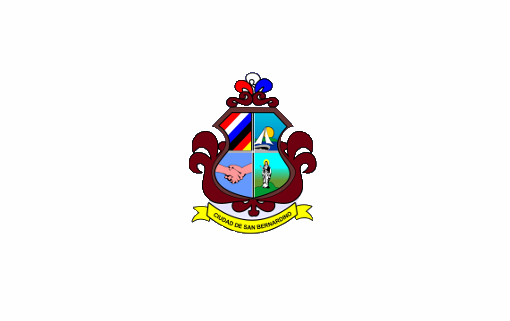
San Bernardino

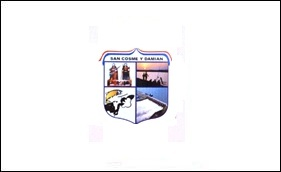
San Cosme y Damián

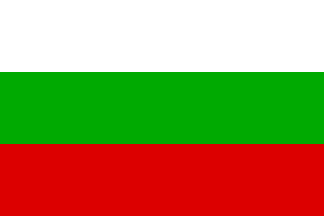
San Ignacio Guazú

San Juan Bautista

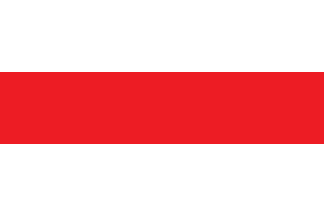
San Lorenzo

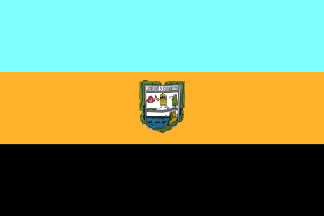
San Pedro de Ycuamandiyú

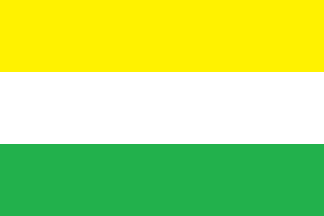
Santa María de Fe

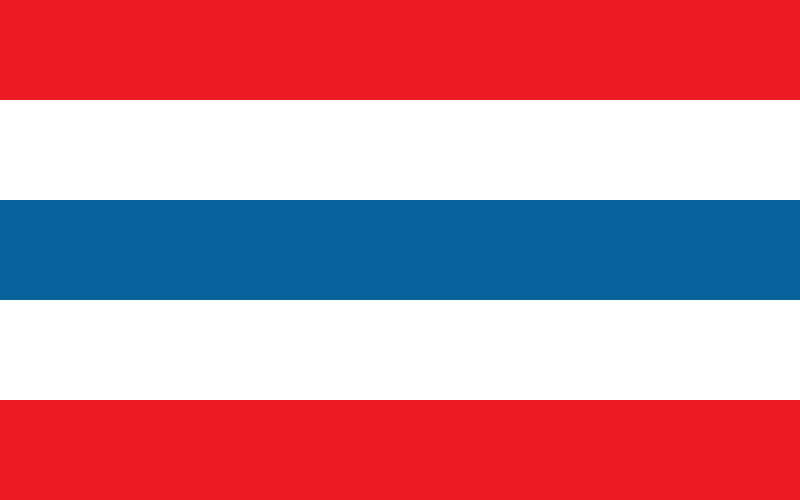
Santa Rosa

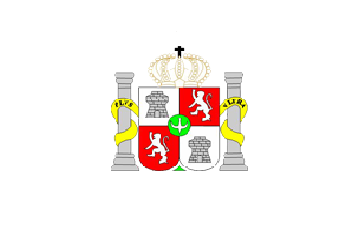
Villarrica

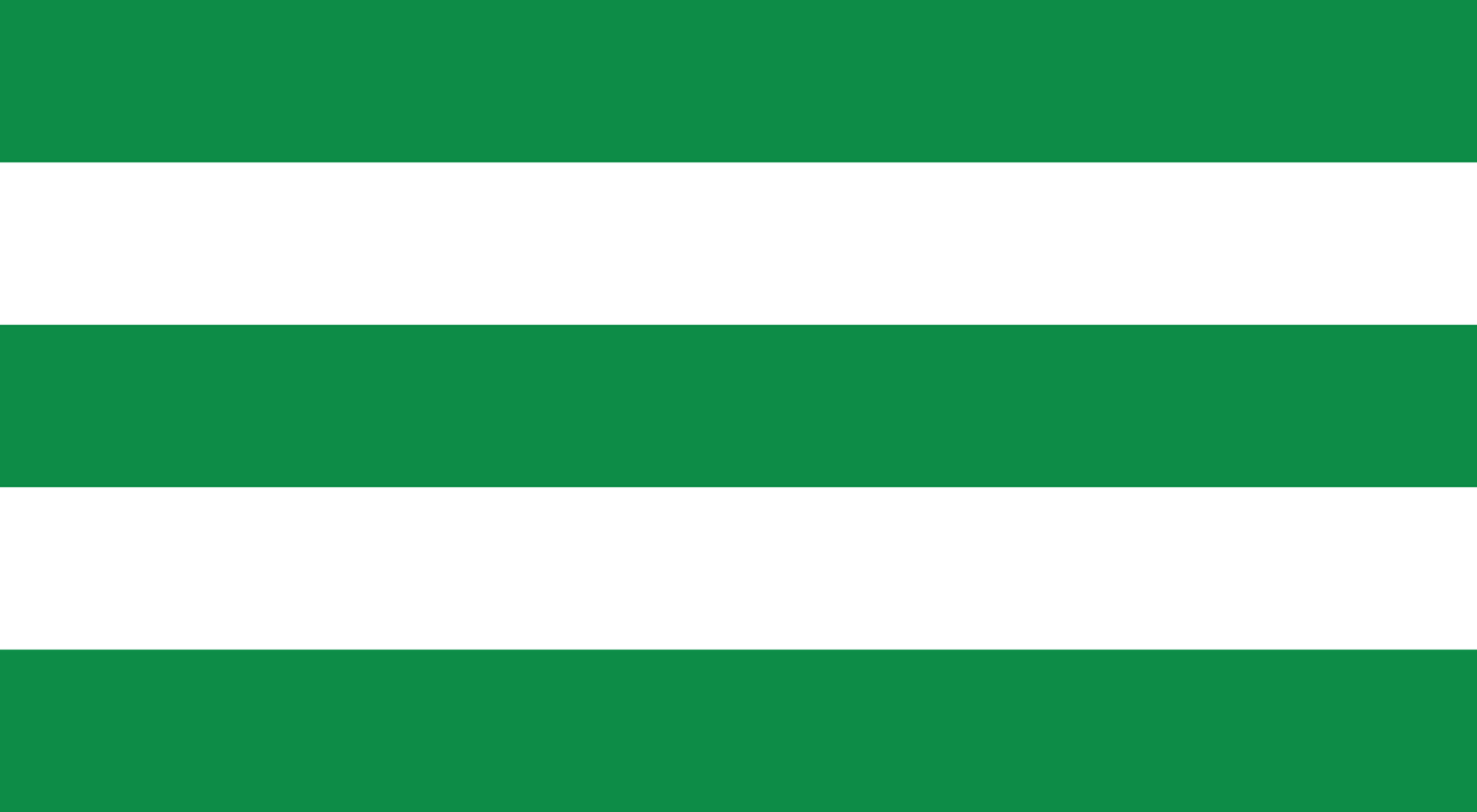
Ypacaraí

== Peru ==
Andahuaylas

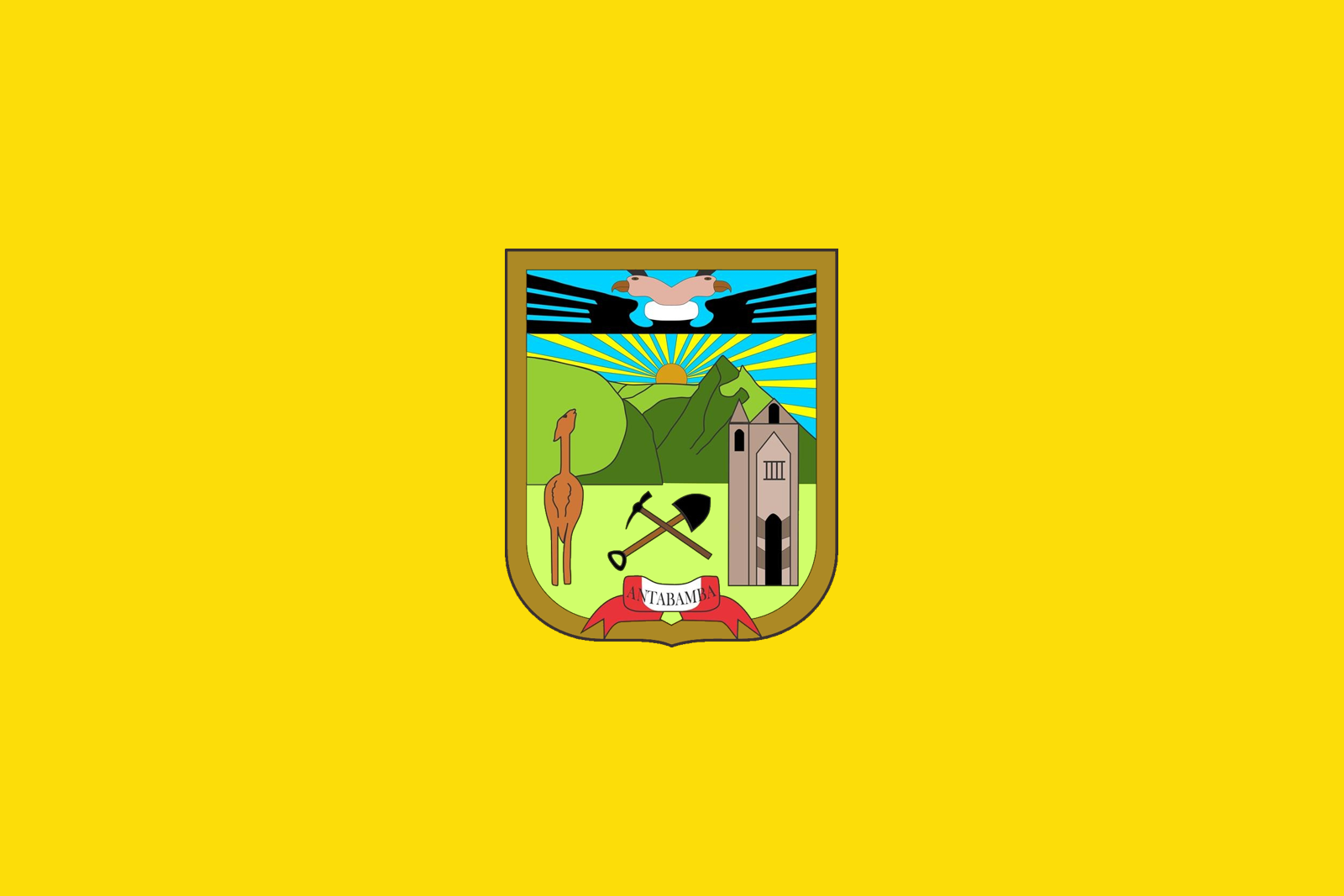
Antabamba

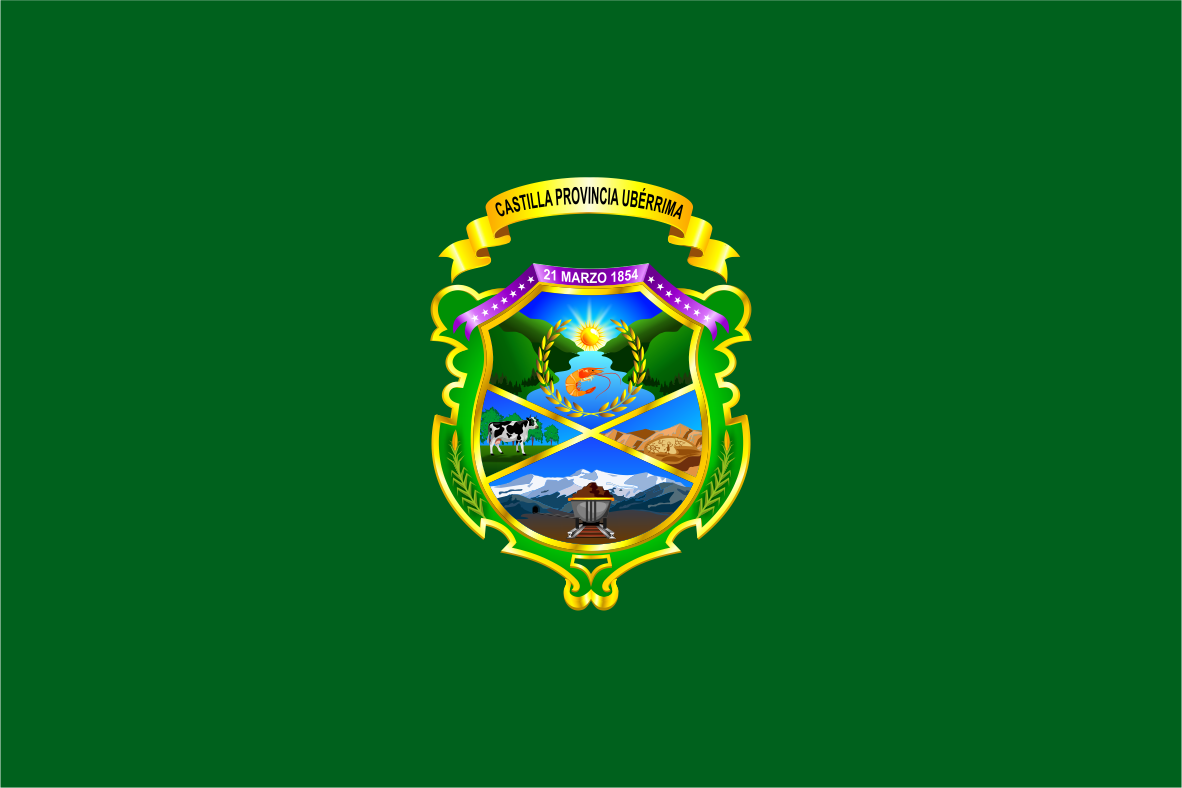
Aplao

Arequipa

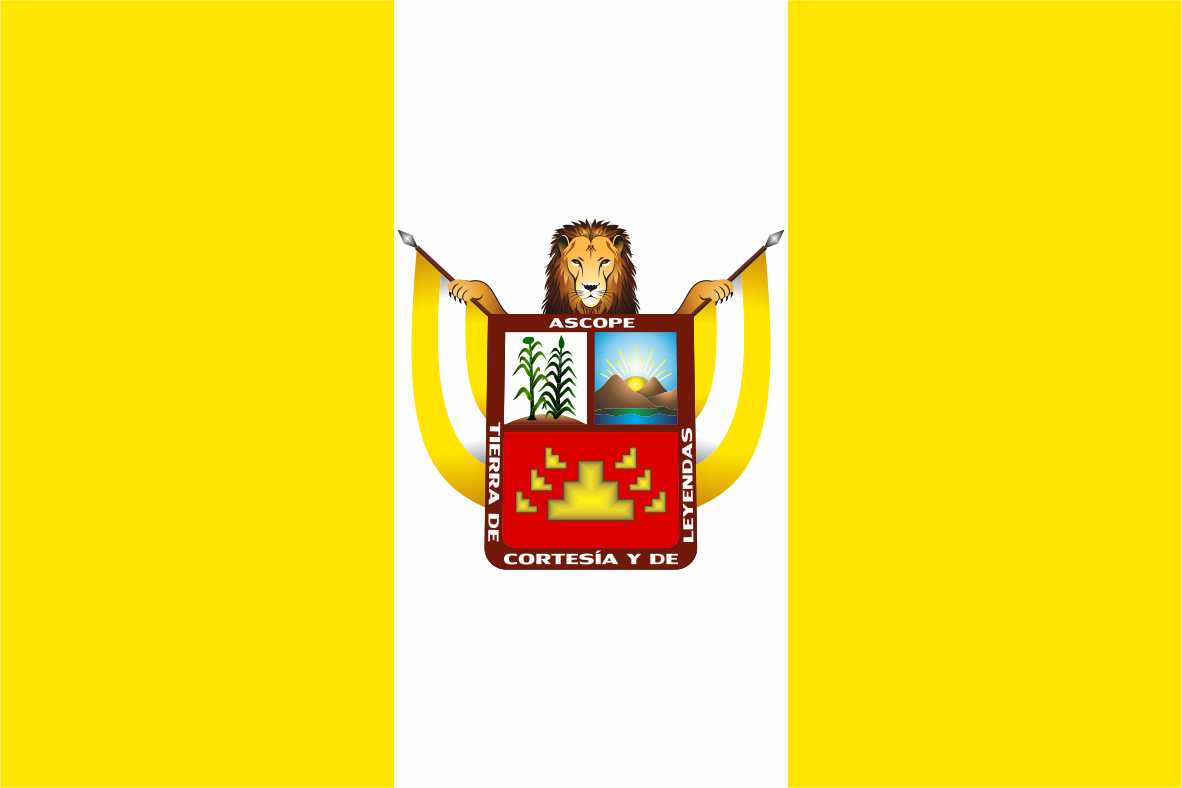
Ascope

Ayabaca

Ayacucho

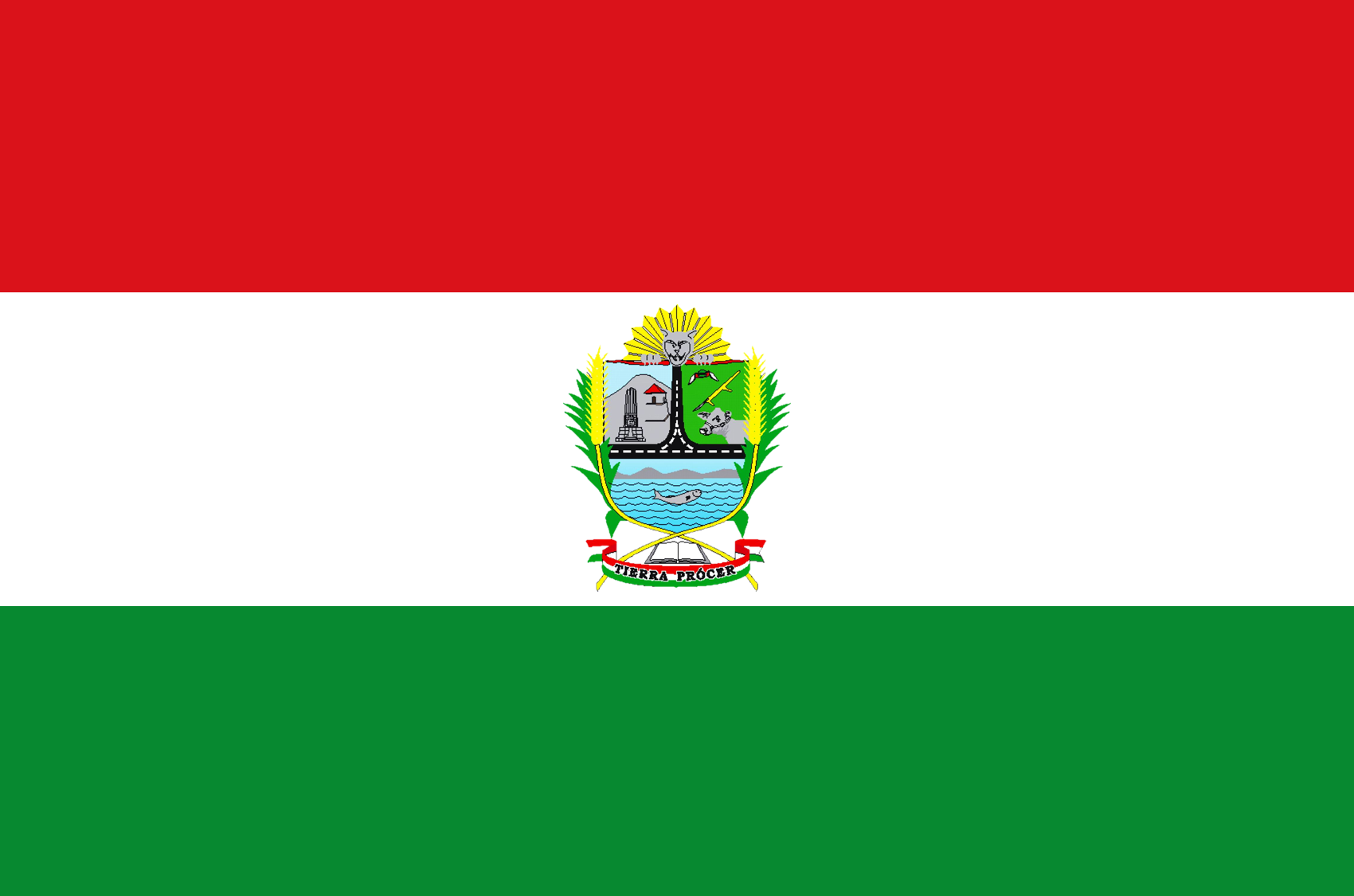
Azángaro

Bagua Grande

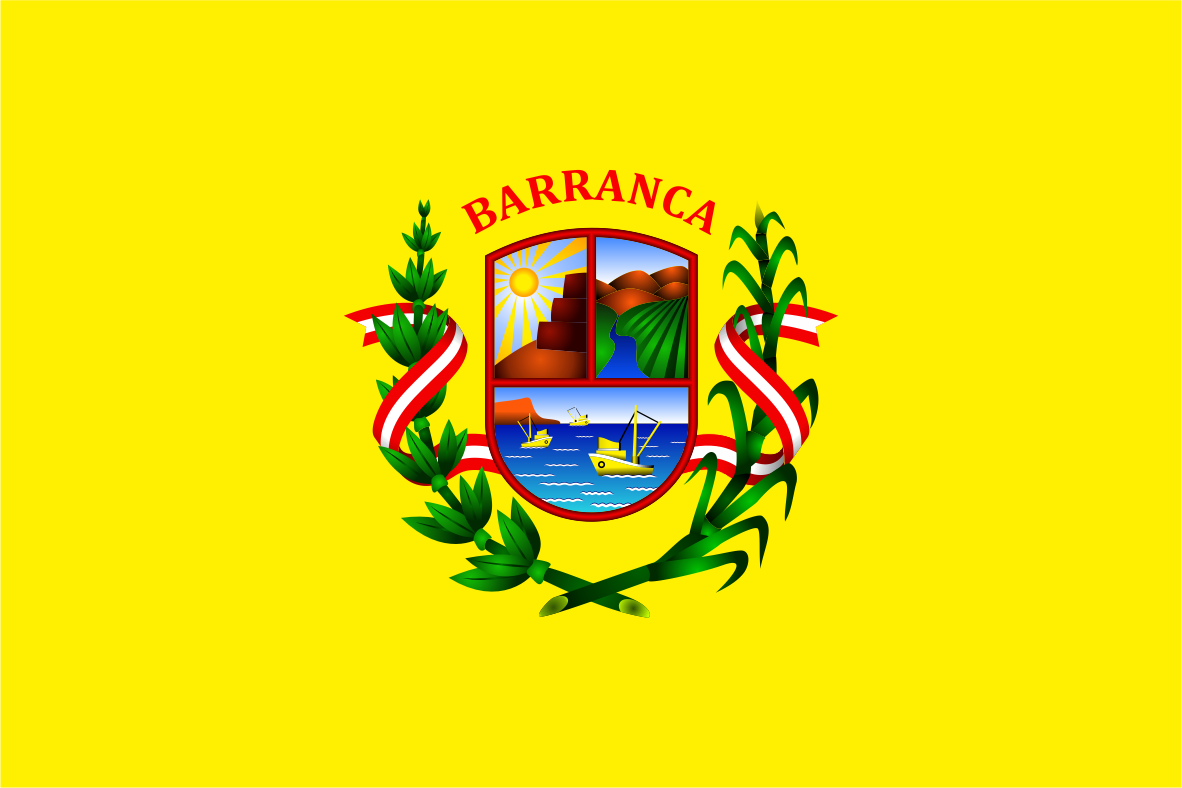
Barranca

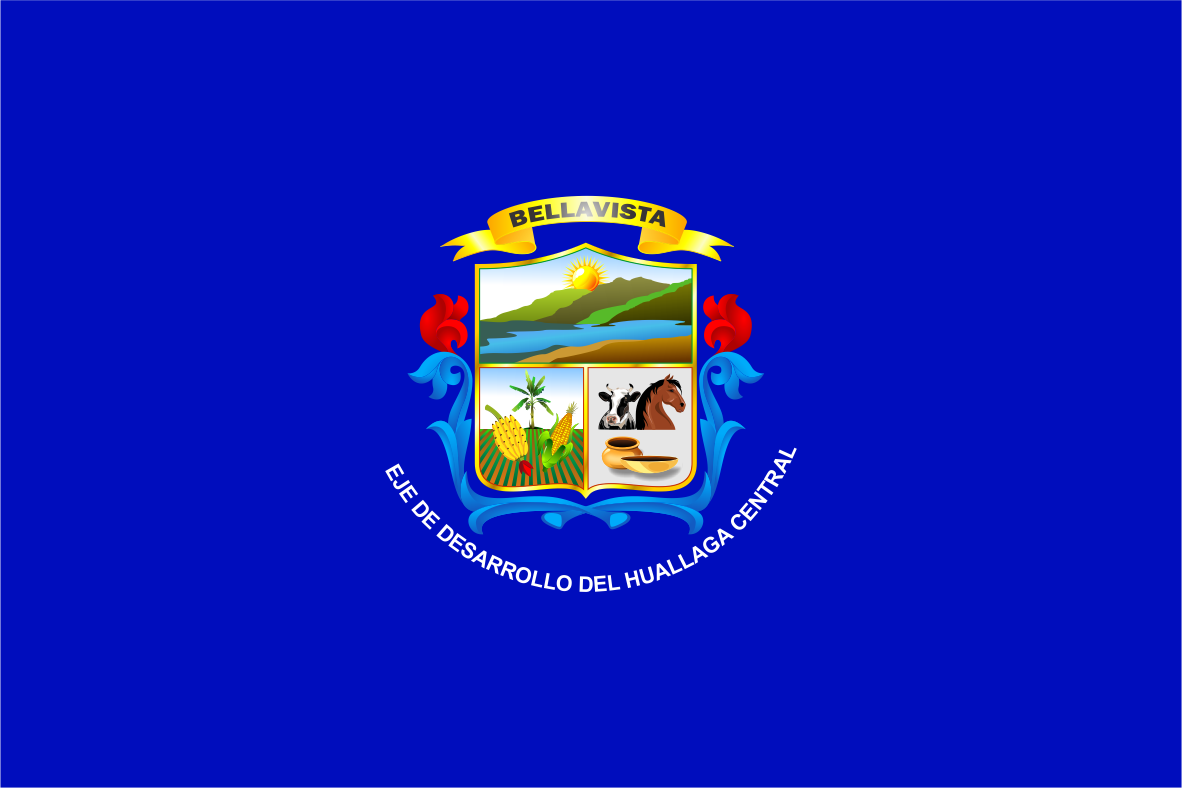
Bellavista

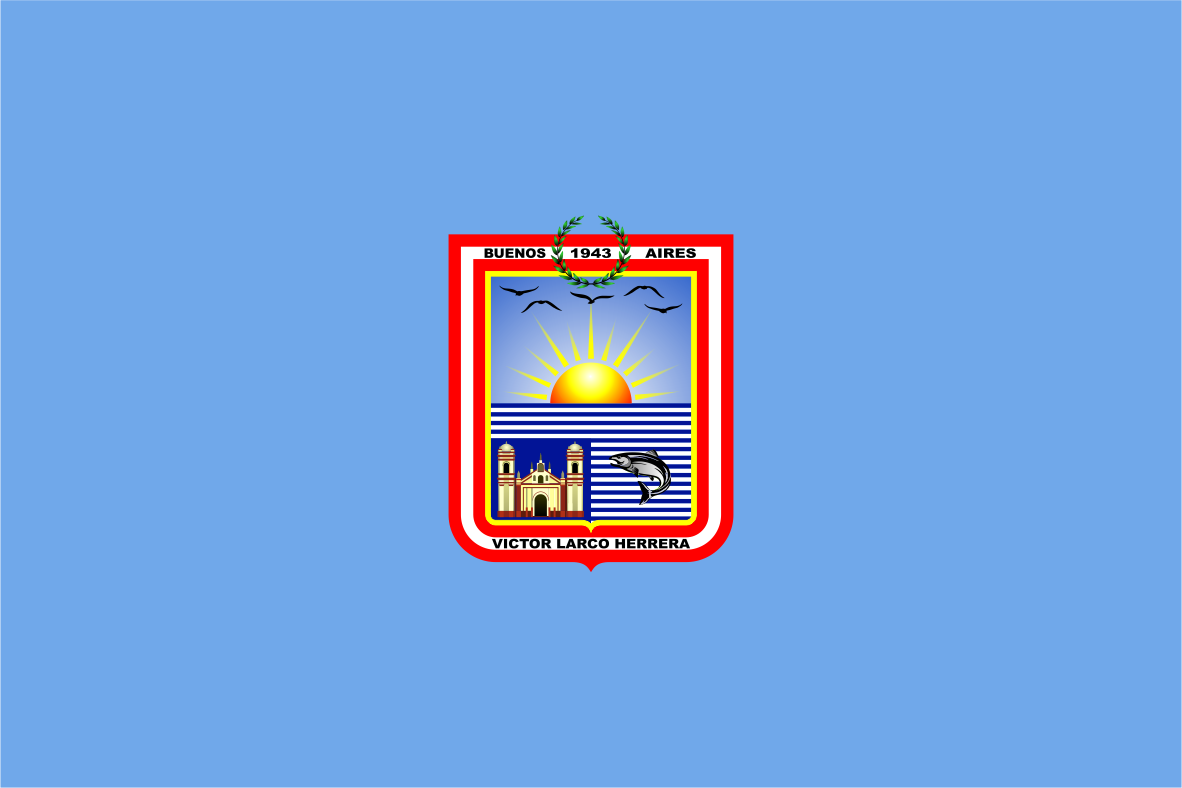
Buenos Aires

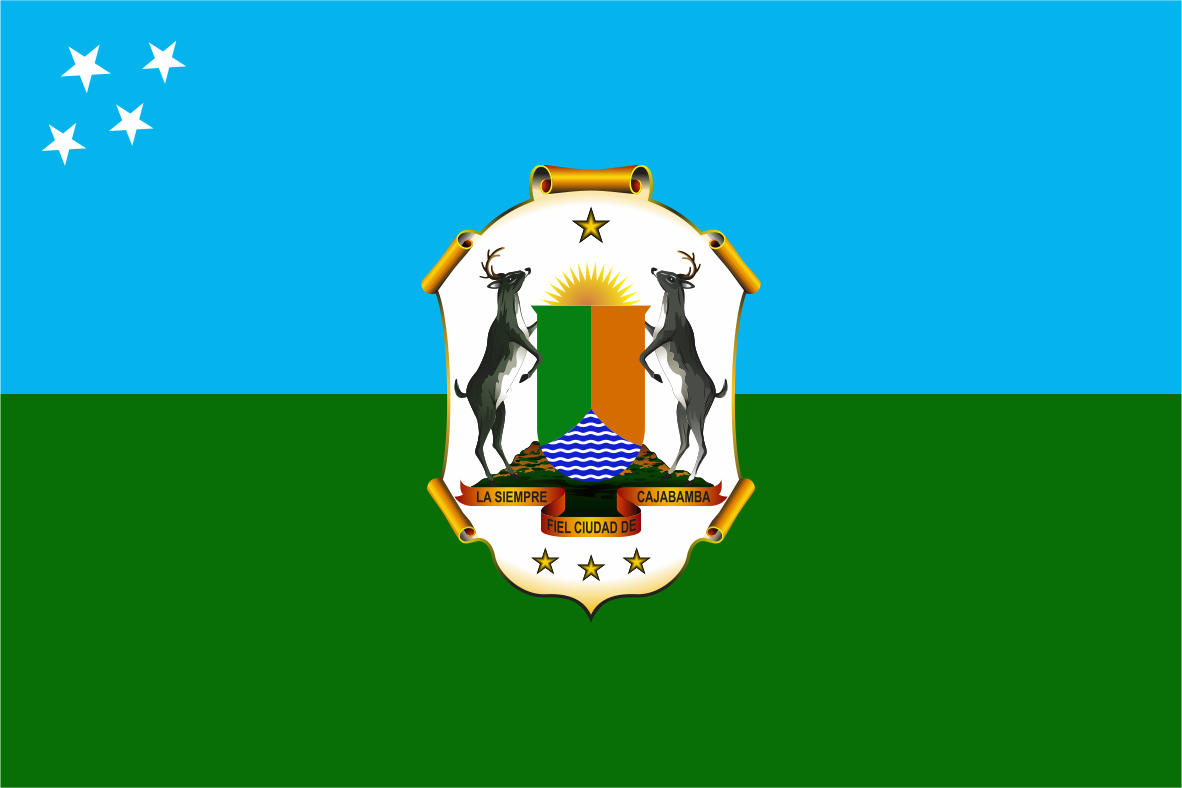
Cajabamba

Cajamarca

Callao

Caraz

Carhuaz

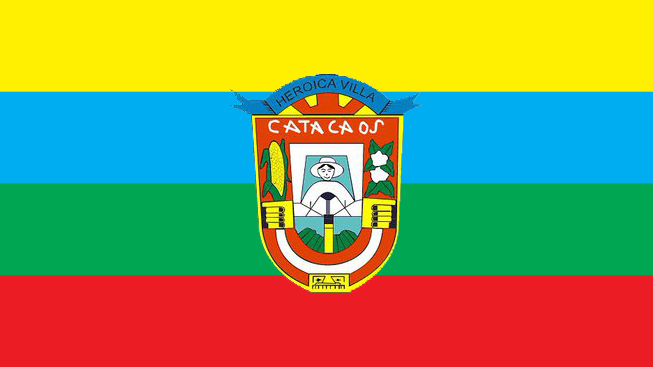
Catacaos

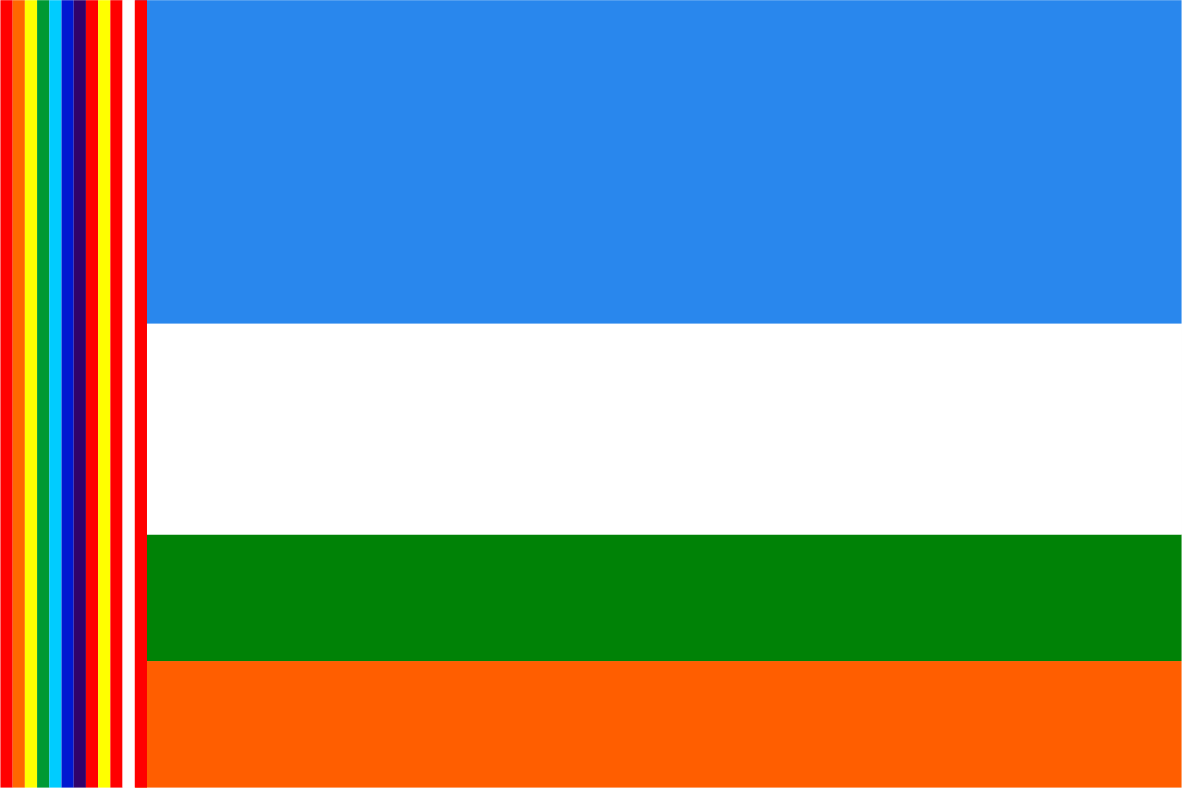
Celendín

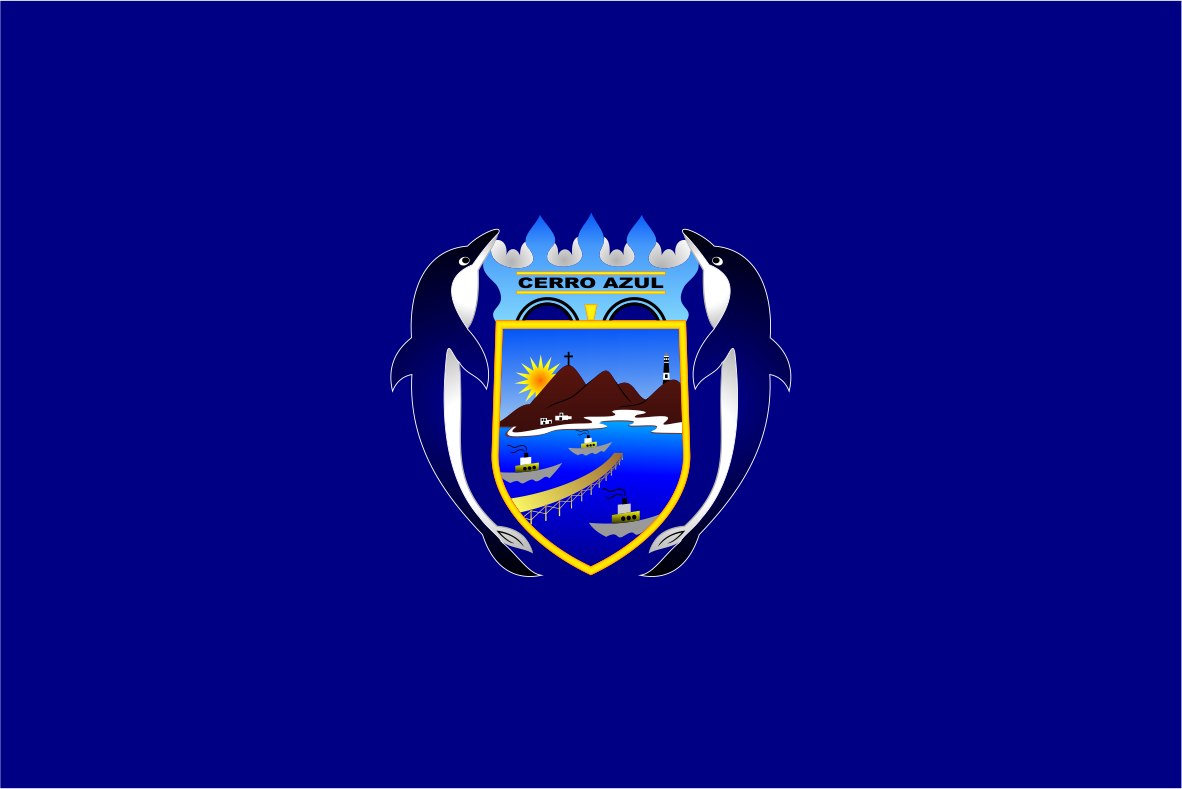
Cerro Azul

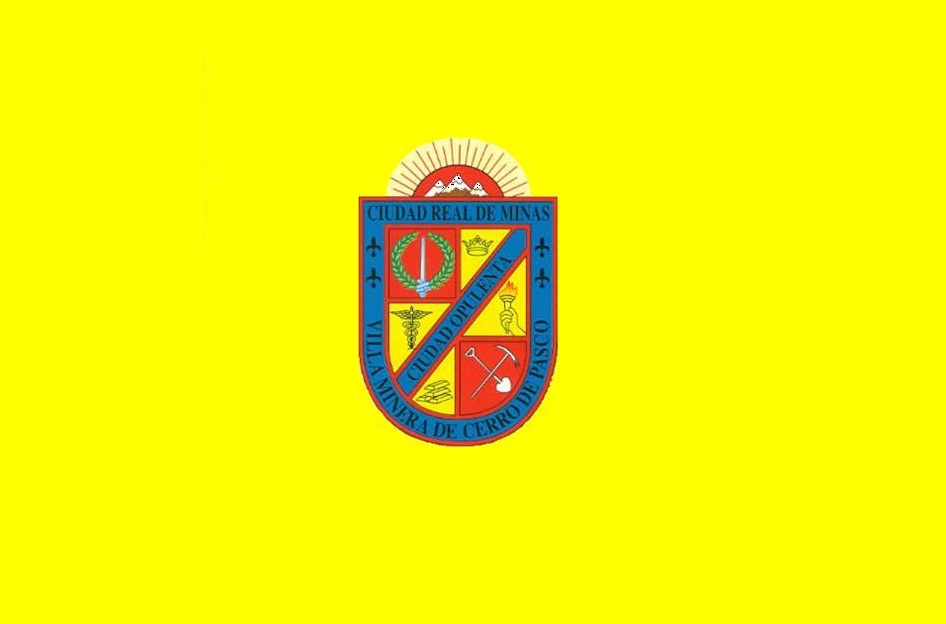
Cerro de Pasco

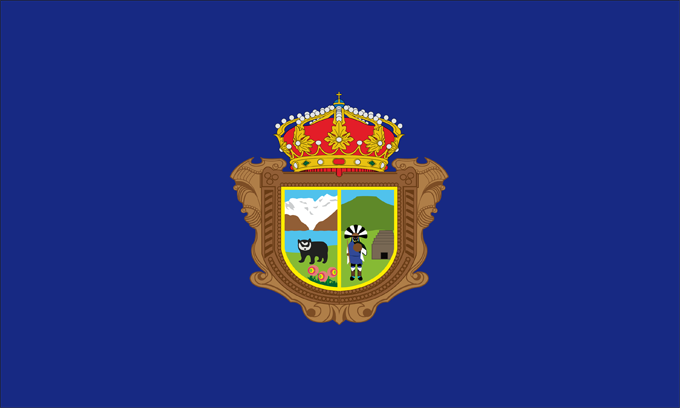
Chacas

Chachapoyas

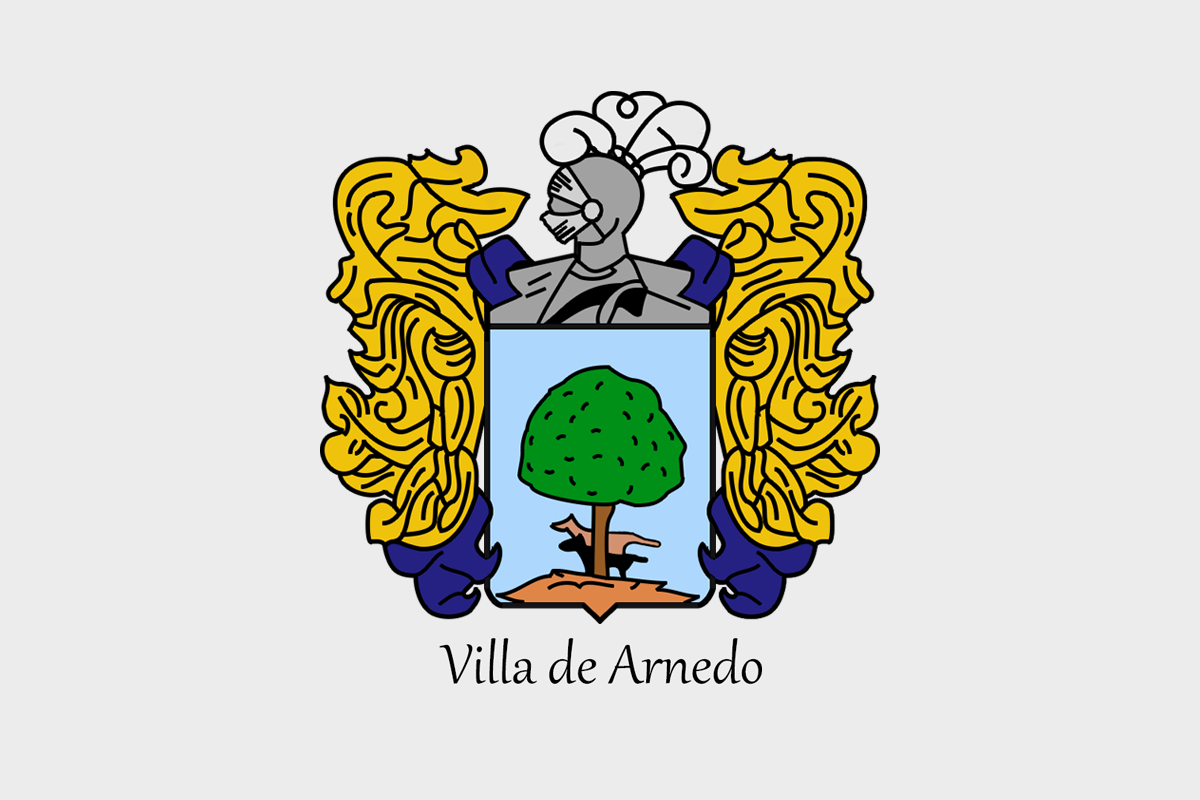
Chancay

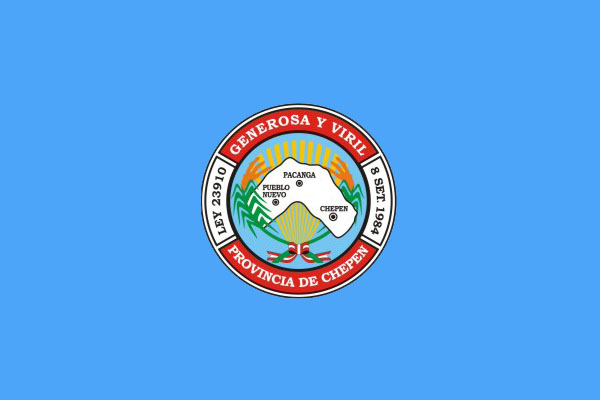
Chepén

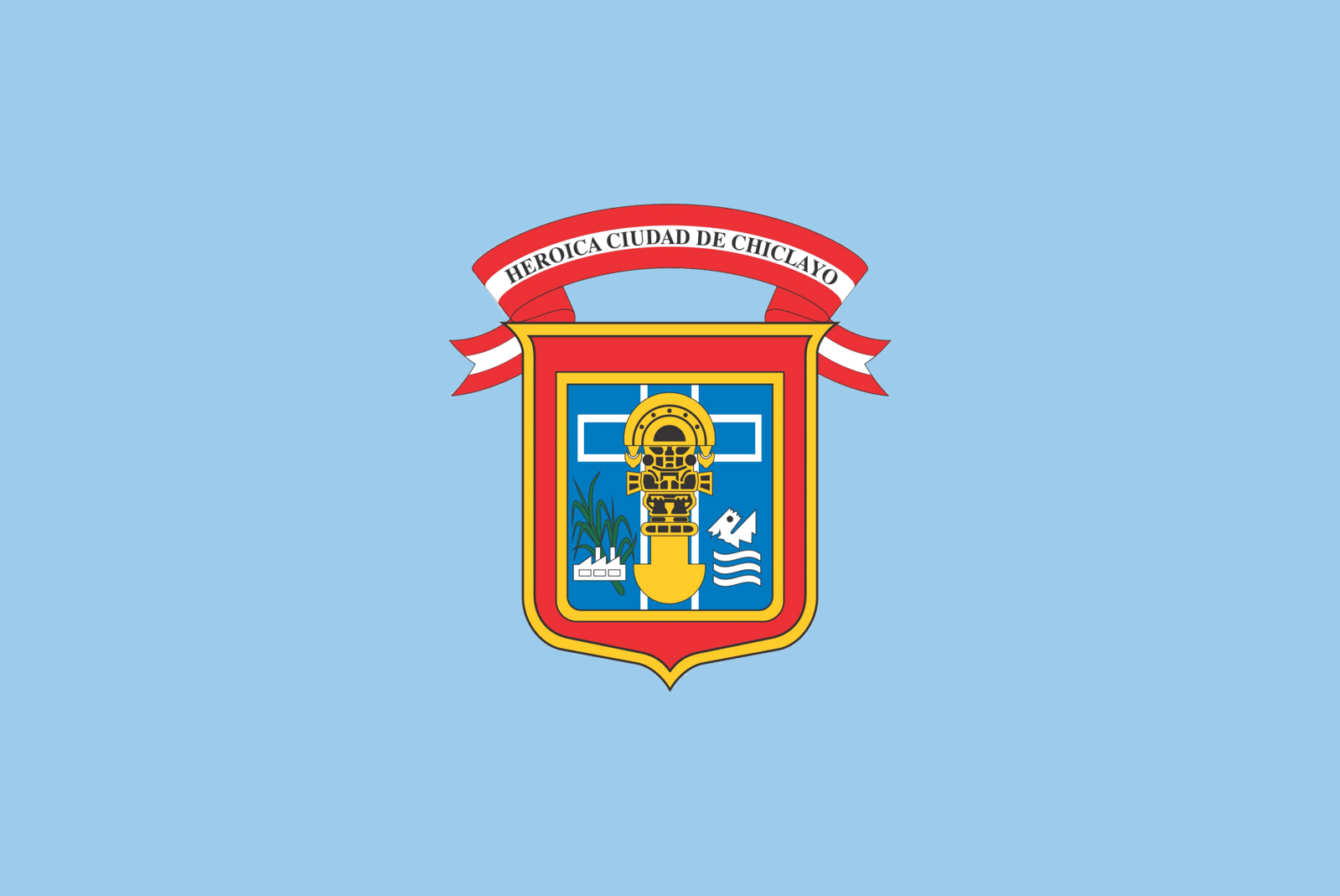
Chiclayo

Chimbote

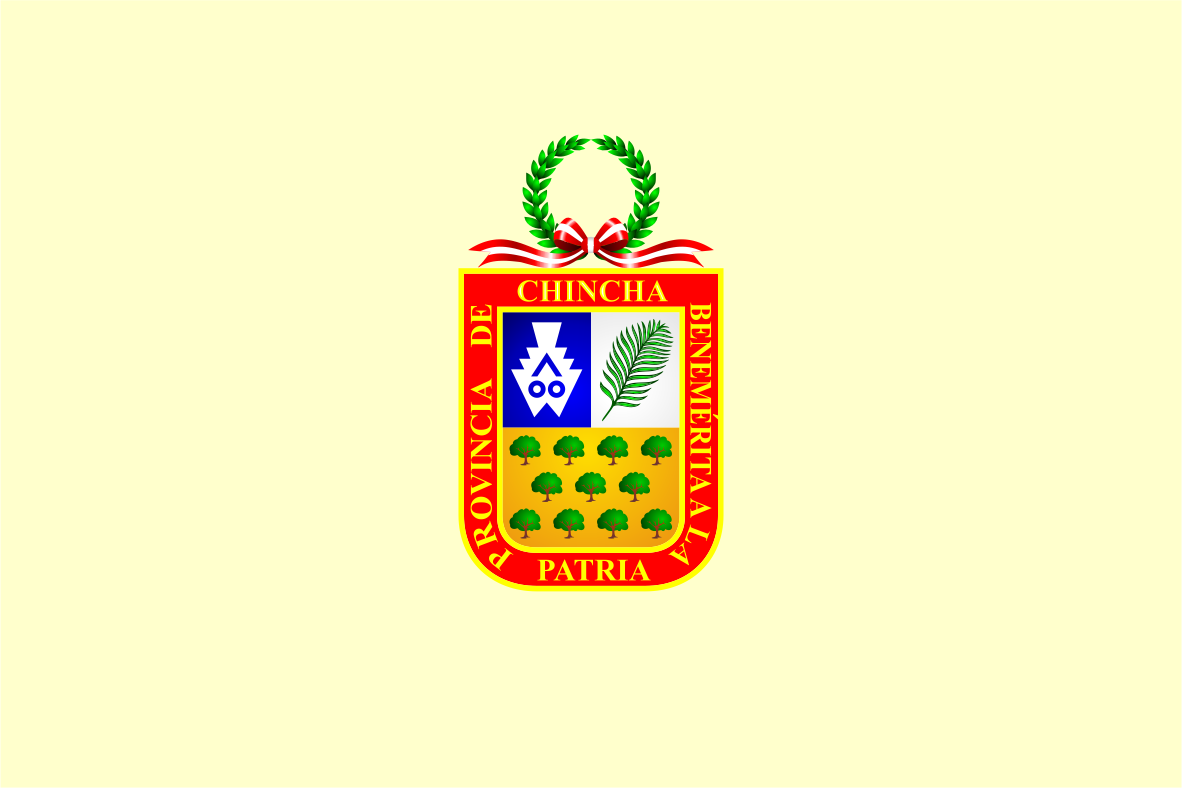
Chincha Alta

Chulucanas

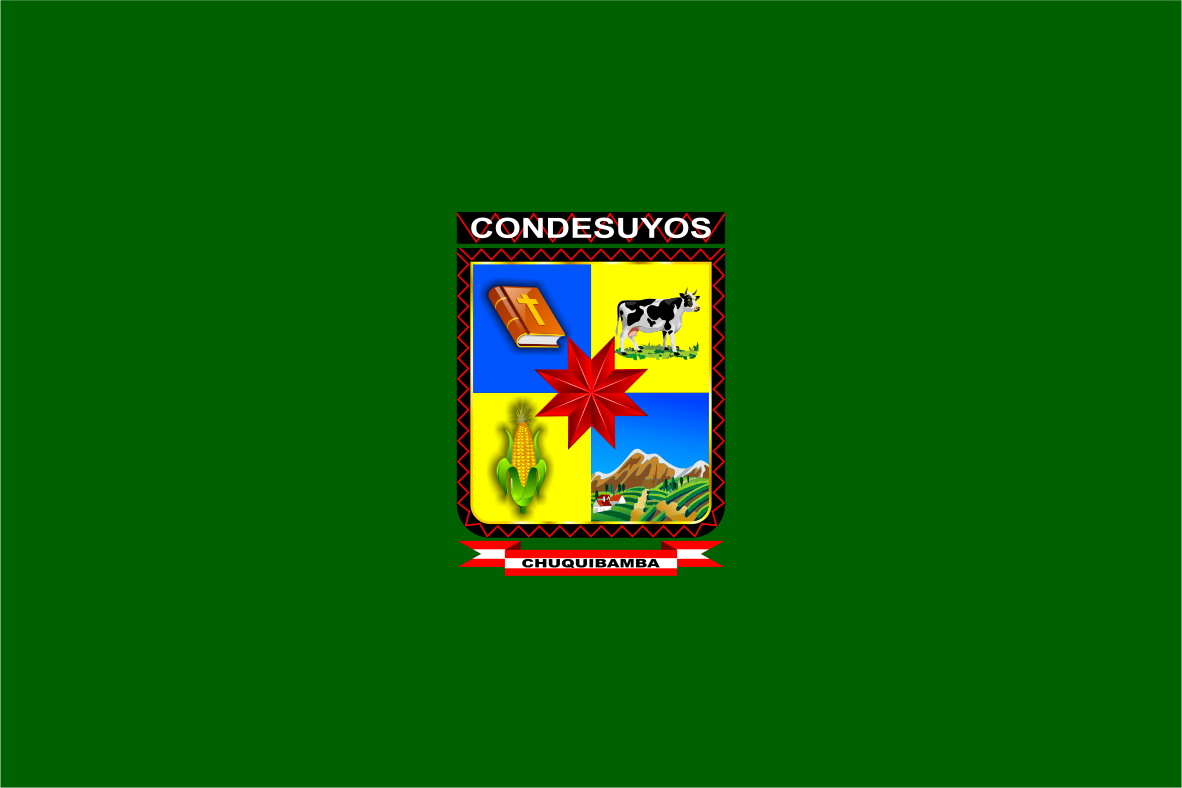
Chuquibamba

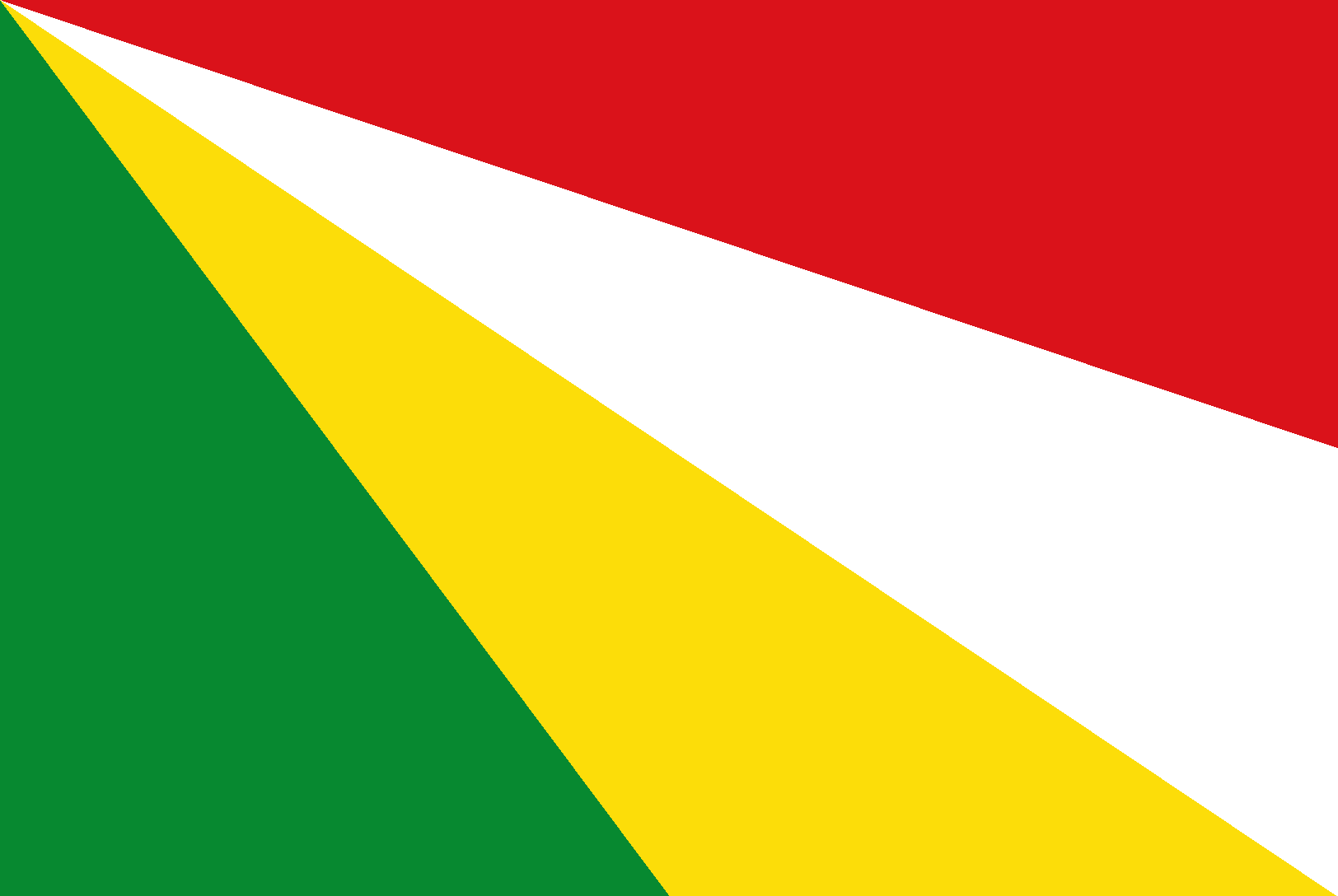
Chuquibambilla

Cusco (details)

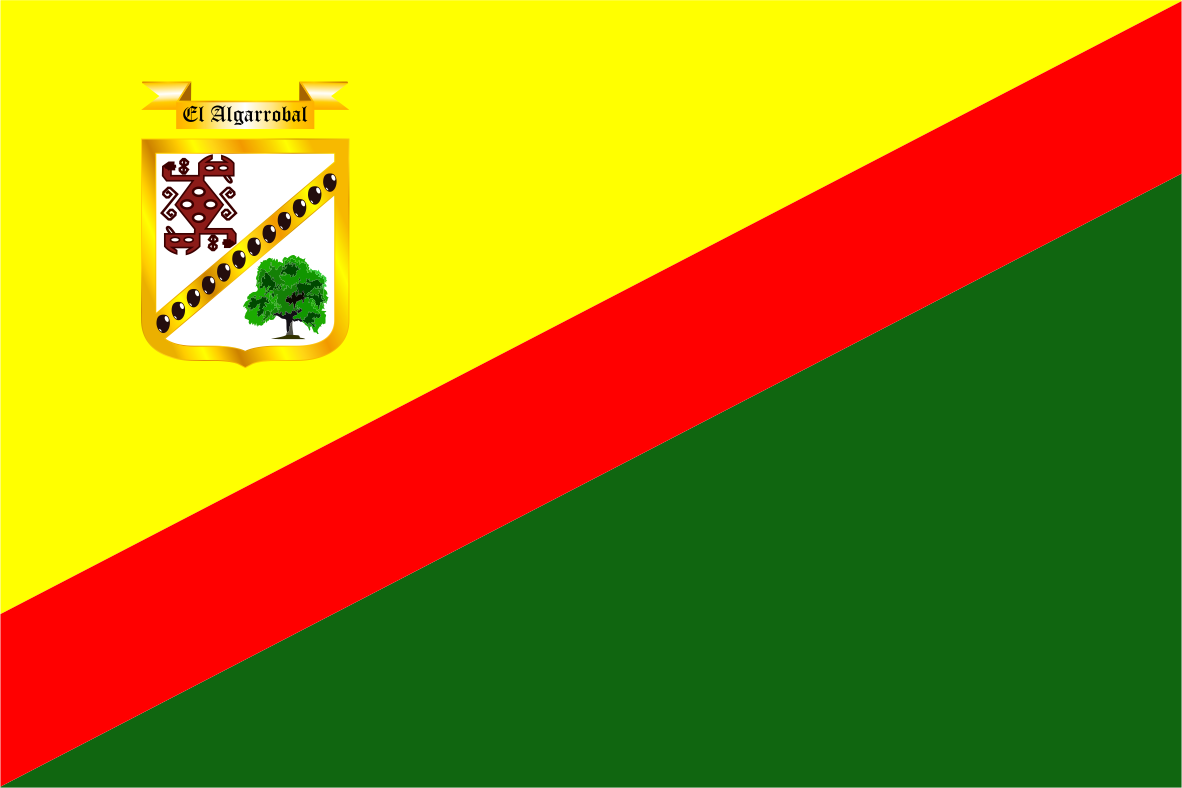
El Algarrobal

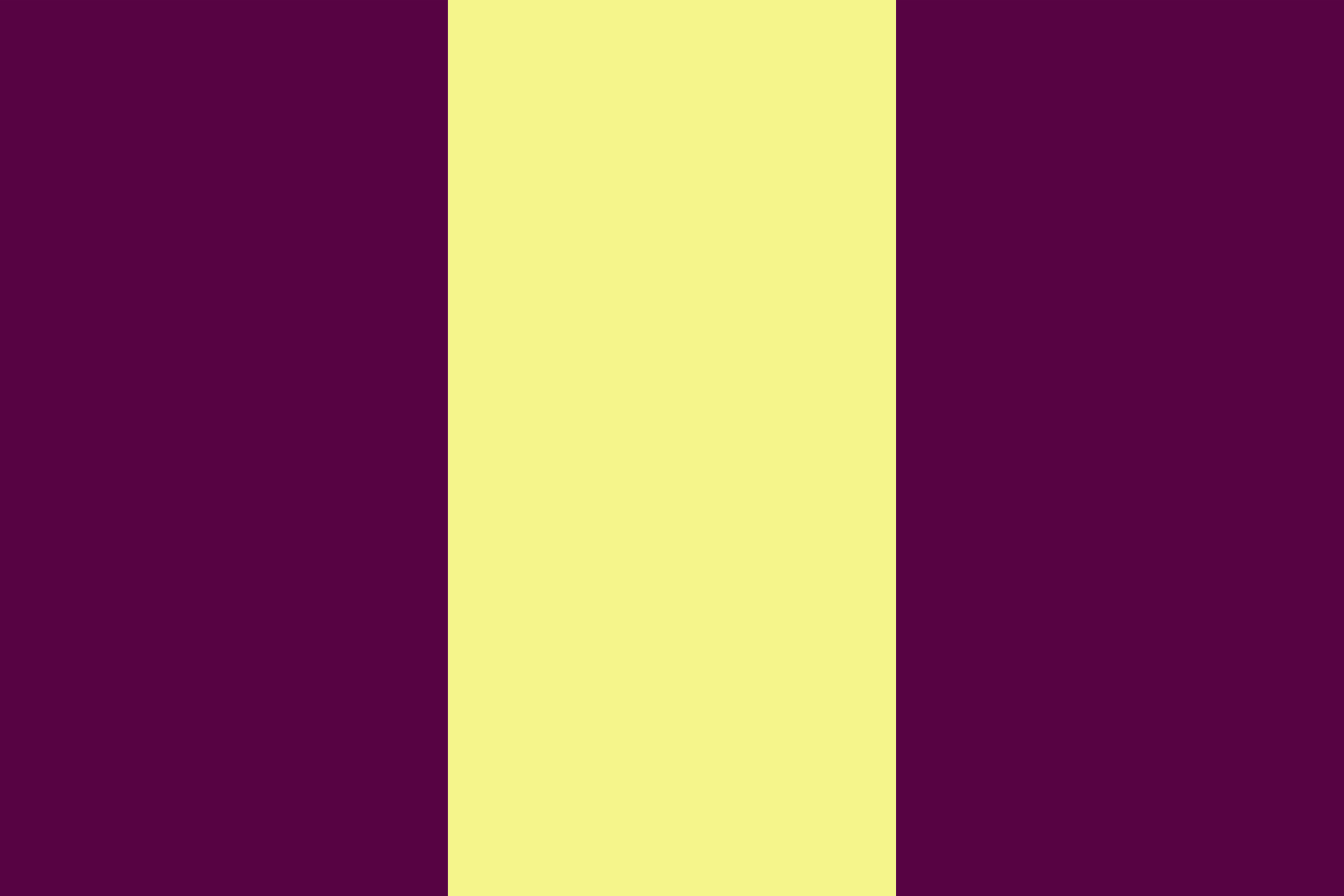
El Milagro

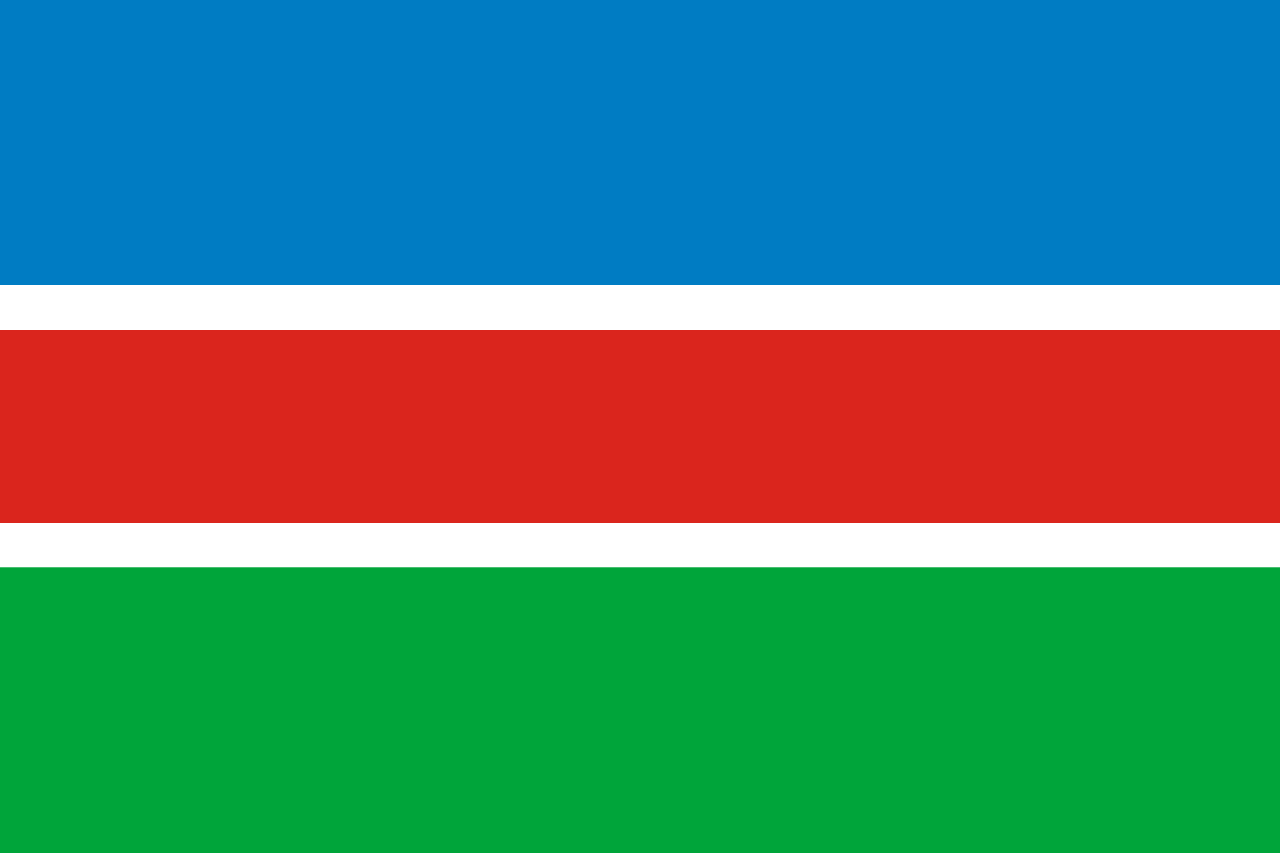
Guadalupe

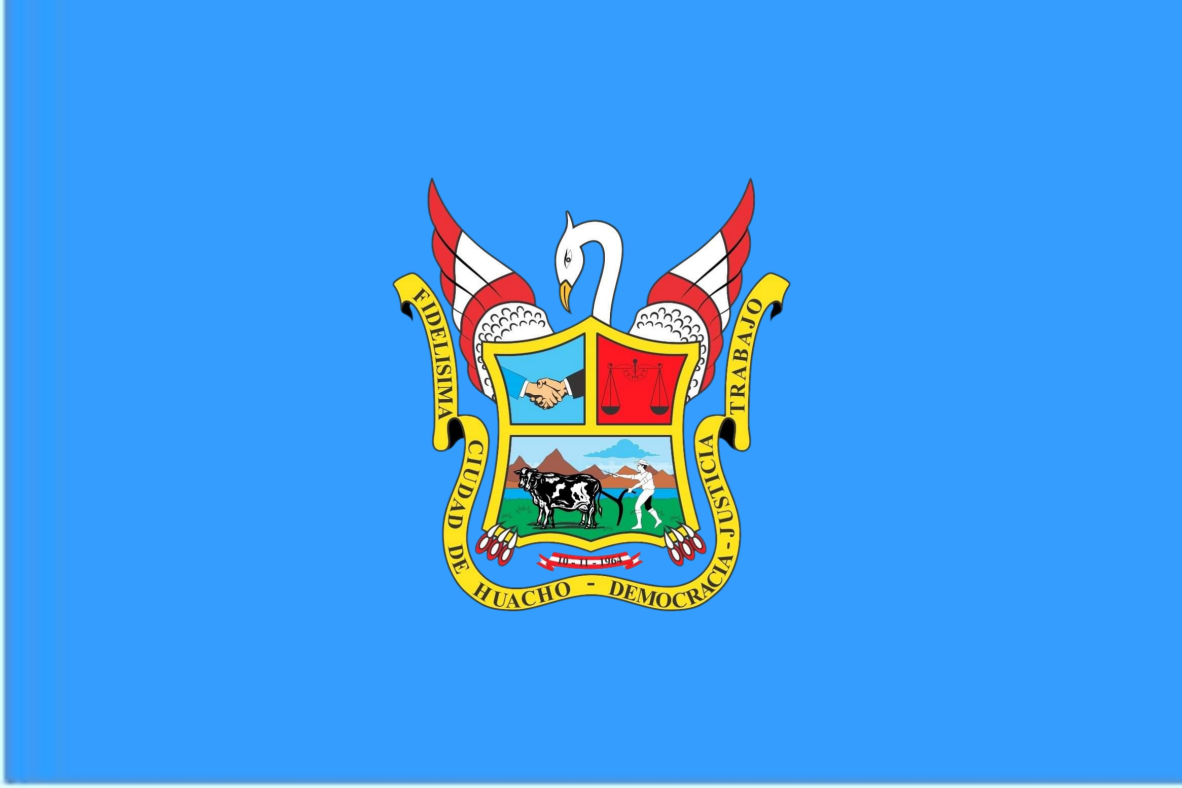
Huacho

Huamachuco

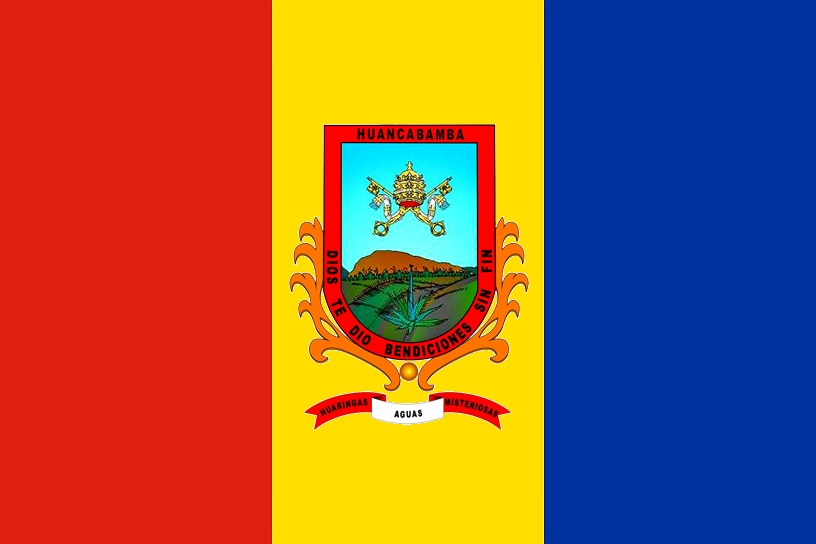
Huancabamba

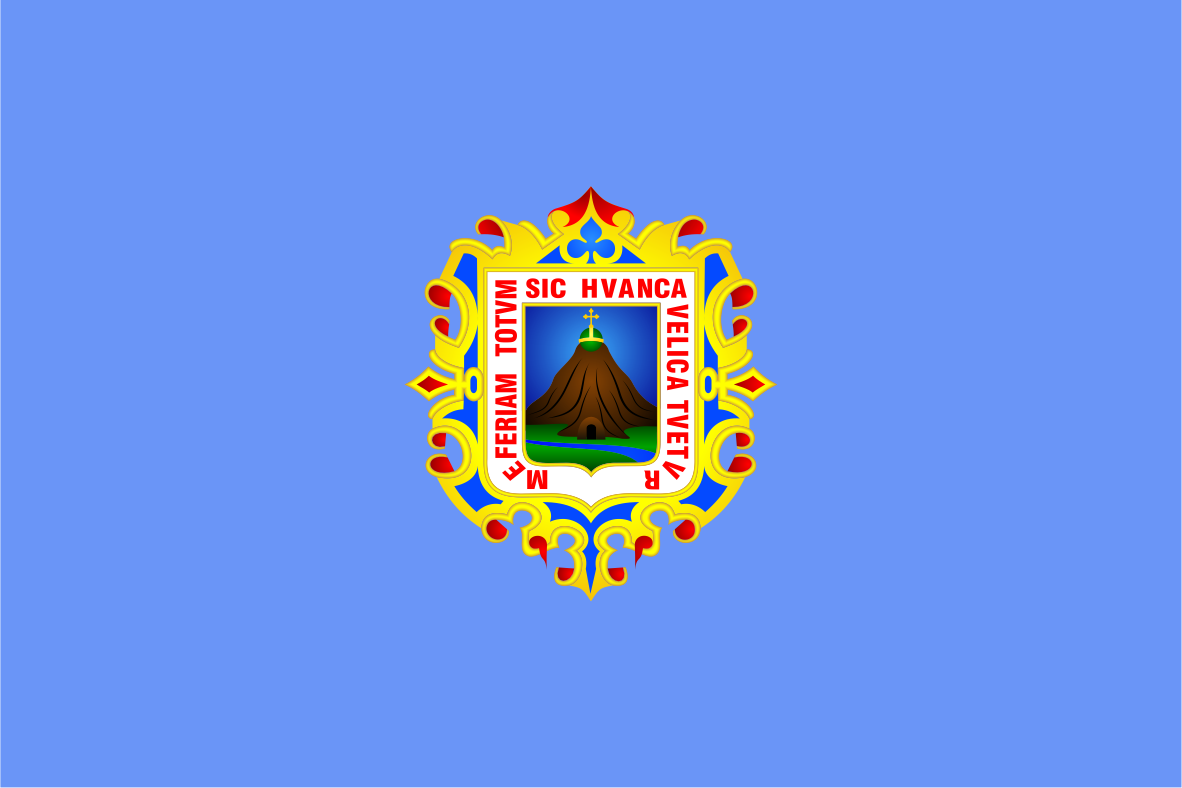
Huancavelica

Huancayo

Huanta

Huánuco

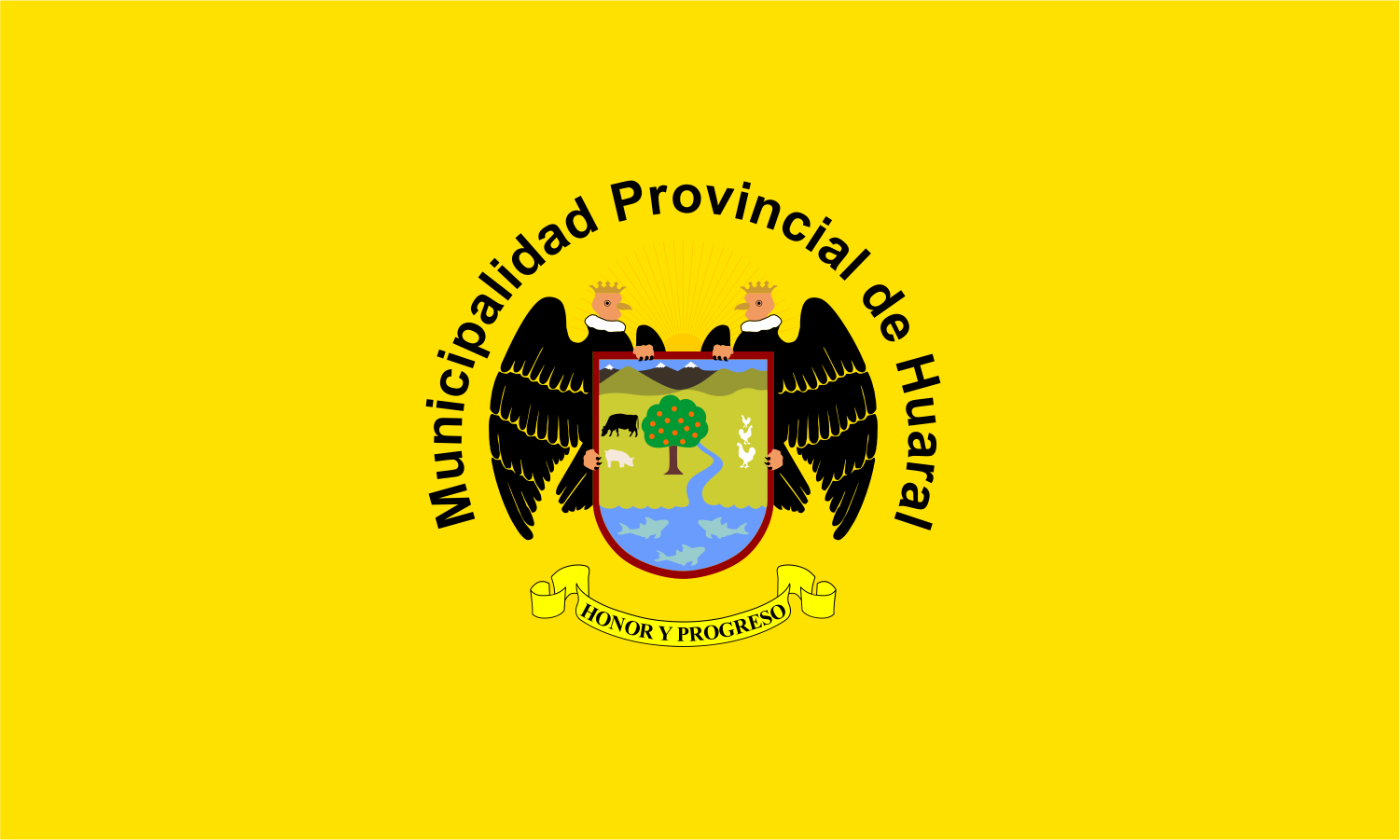
Huaral

Huaraz

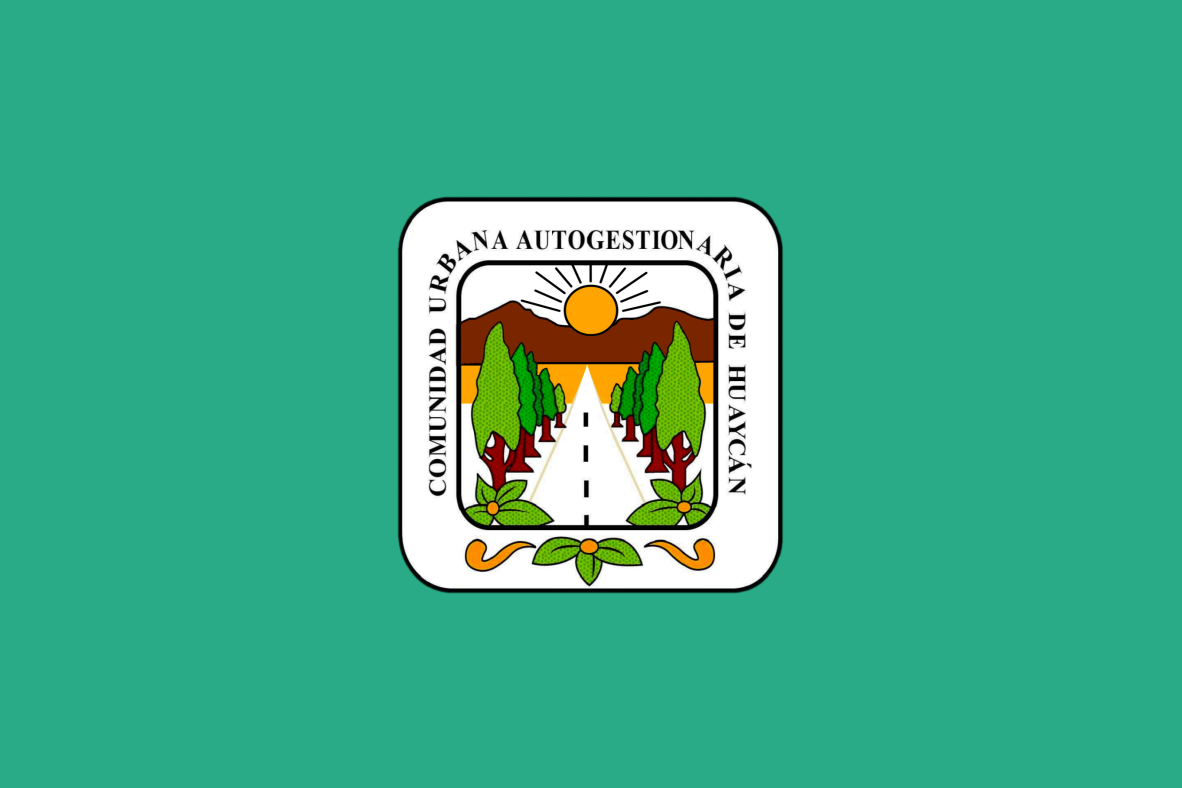
Huaycán

Ica

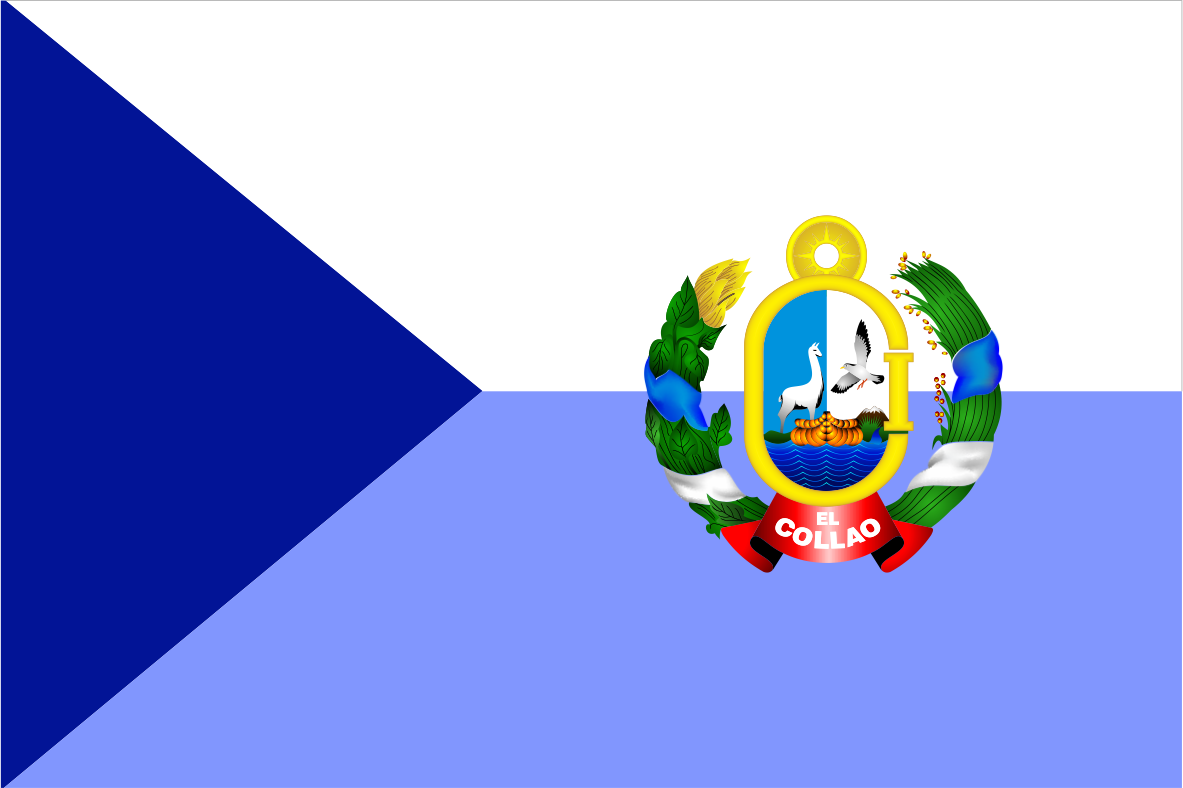
Ilave

Ilo

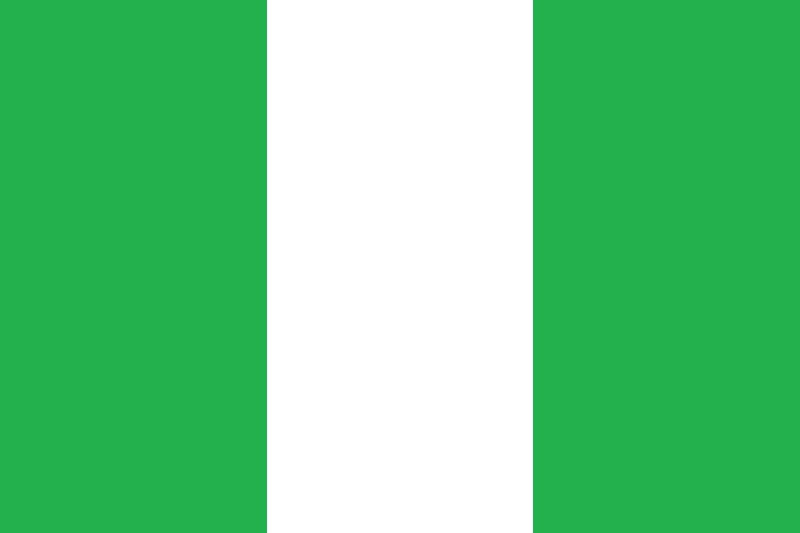
Indiana

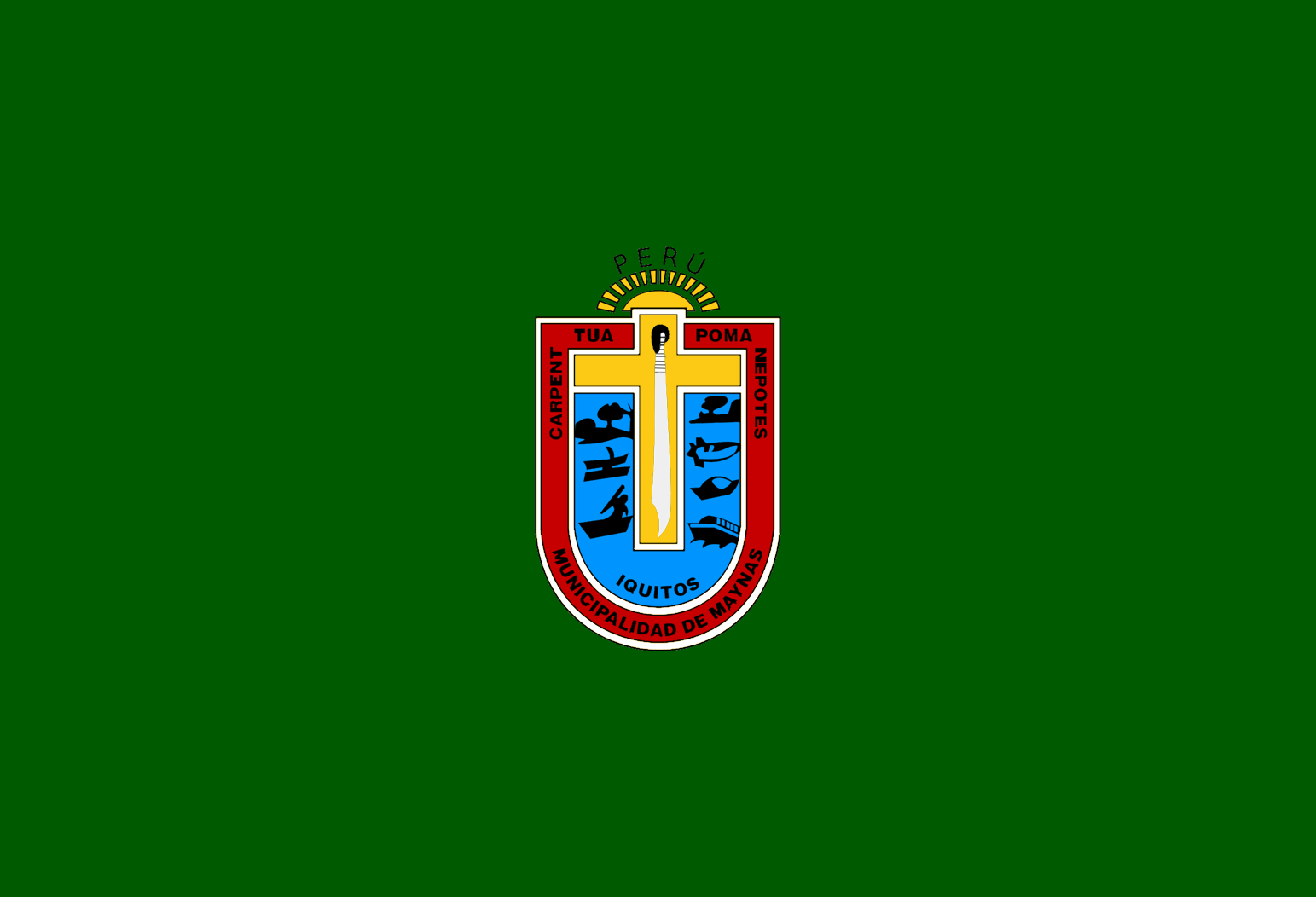
Iquitos

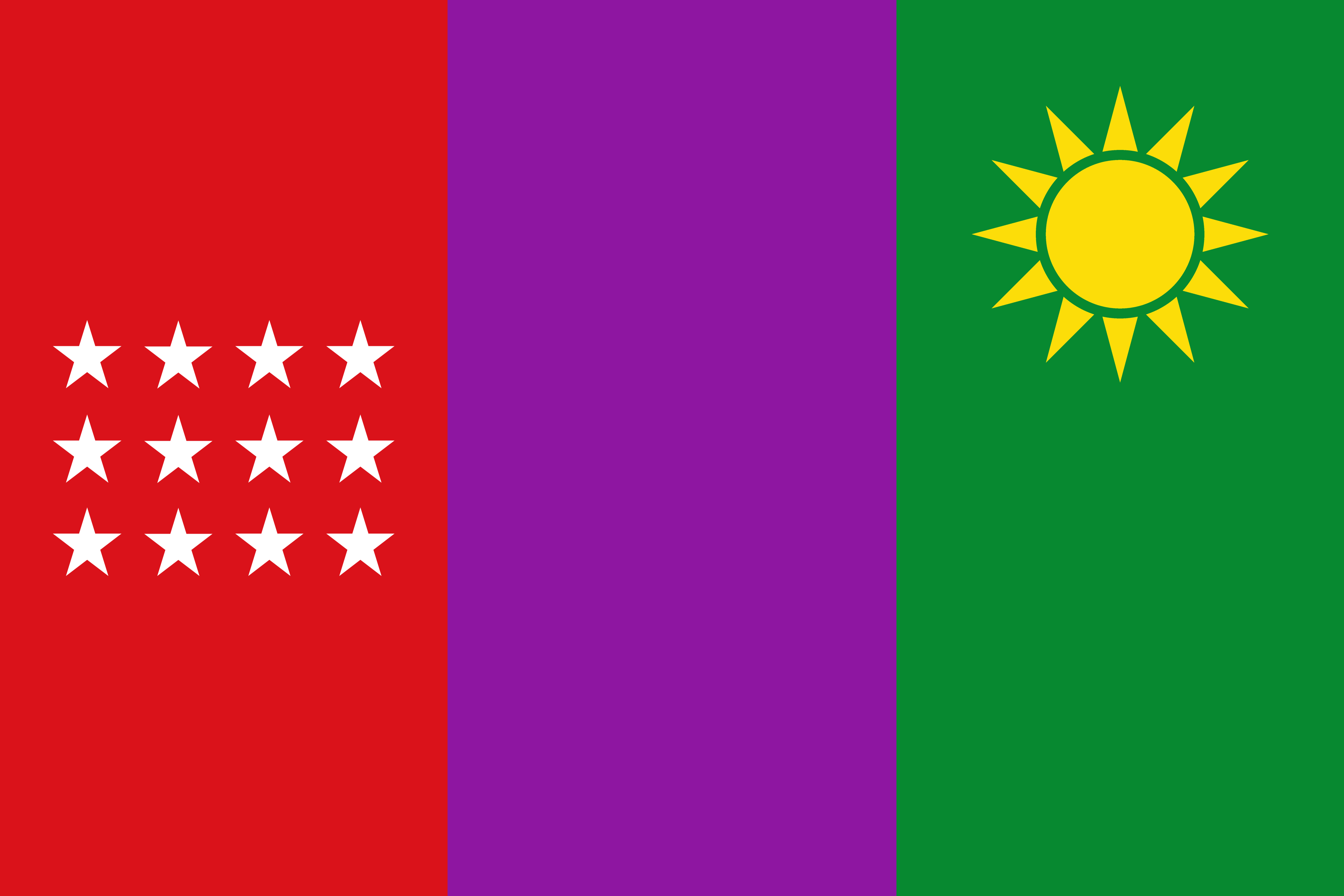
Jaén

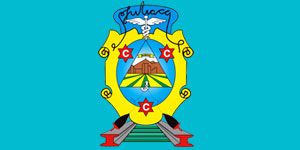
Juliaca

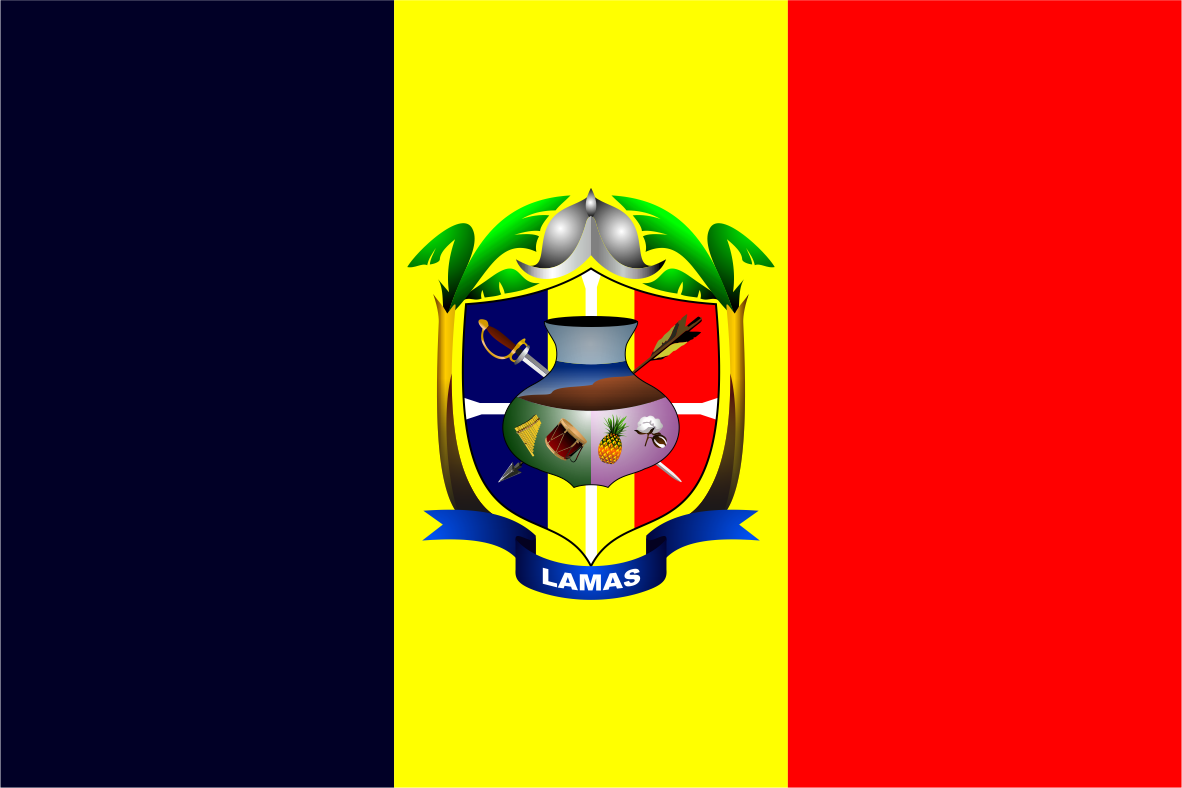
Lamas

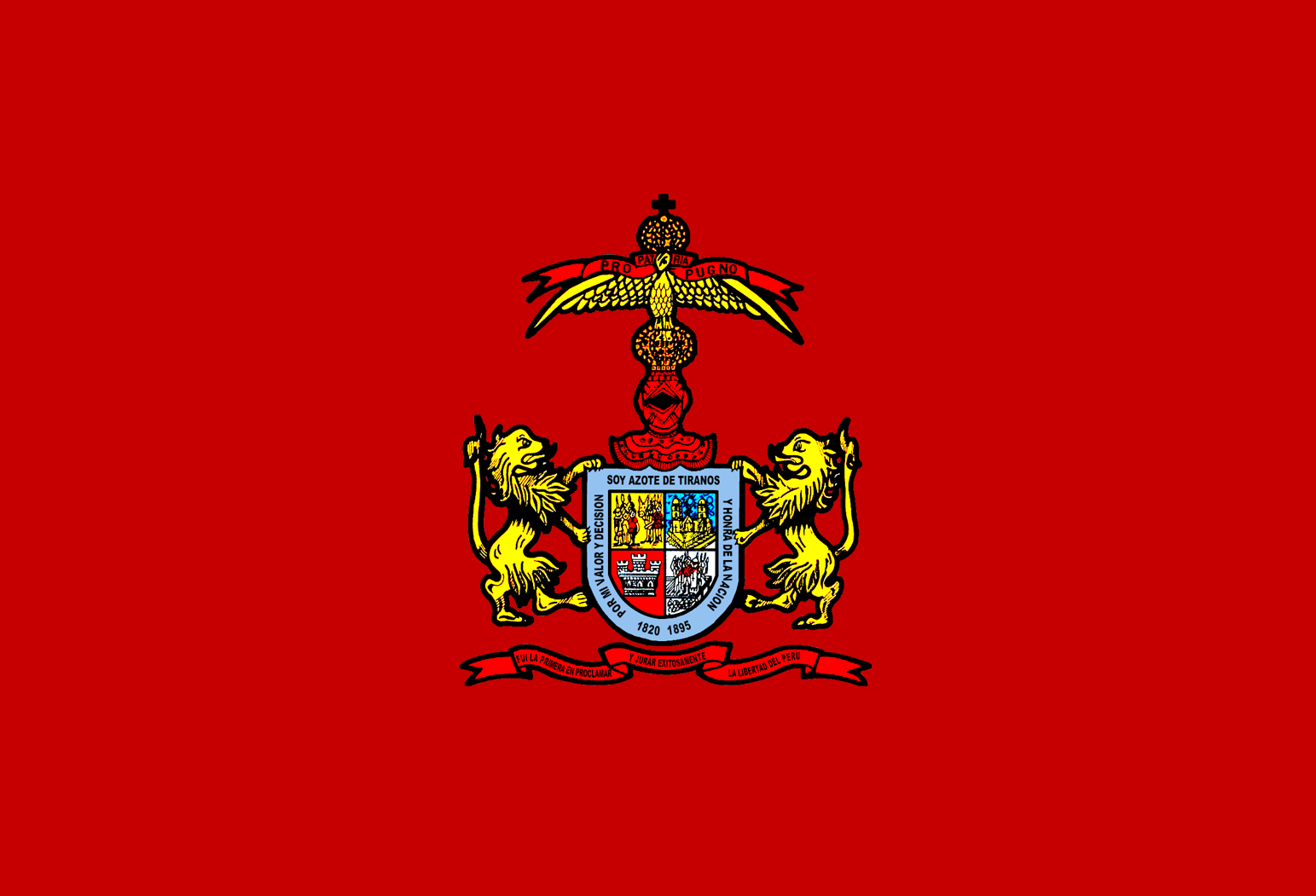
Lambayeque

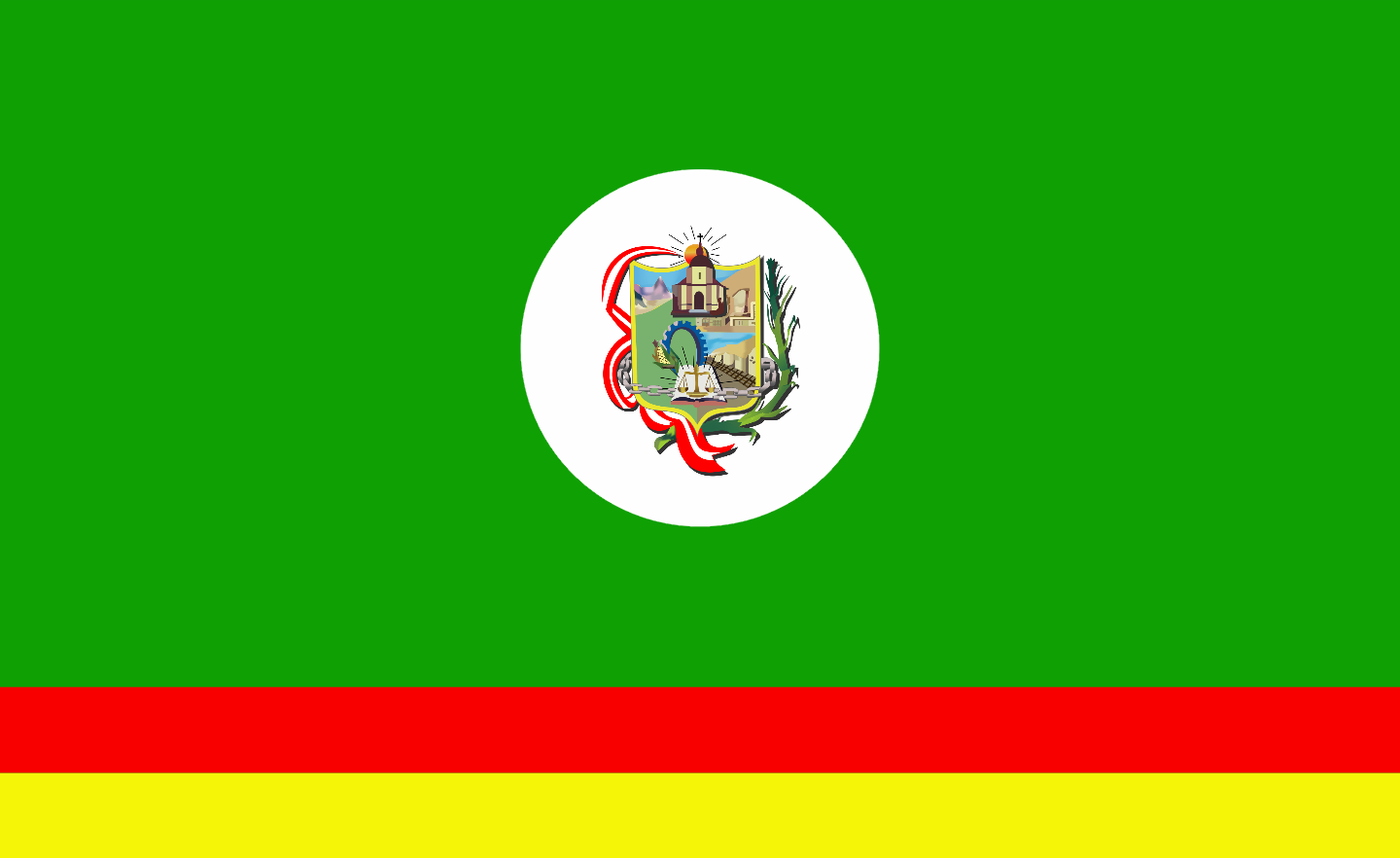
Laredo

La Rinconada

Lima (details)

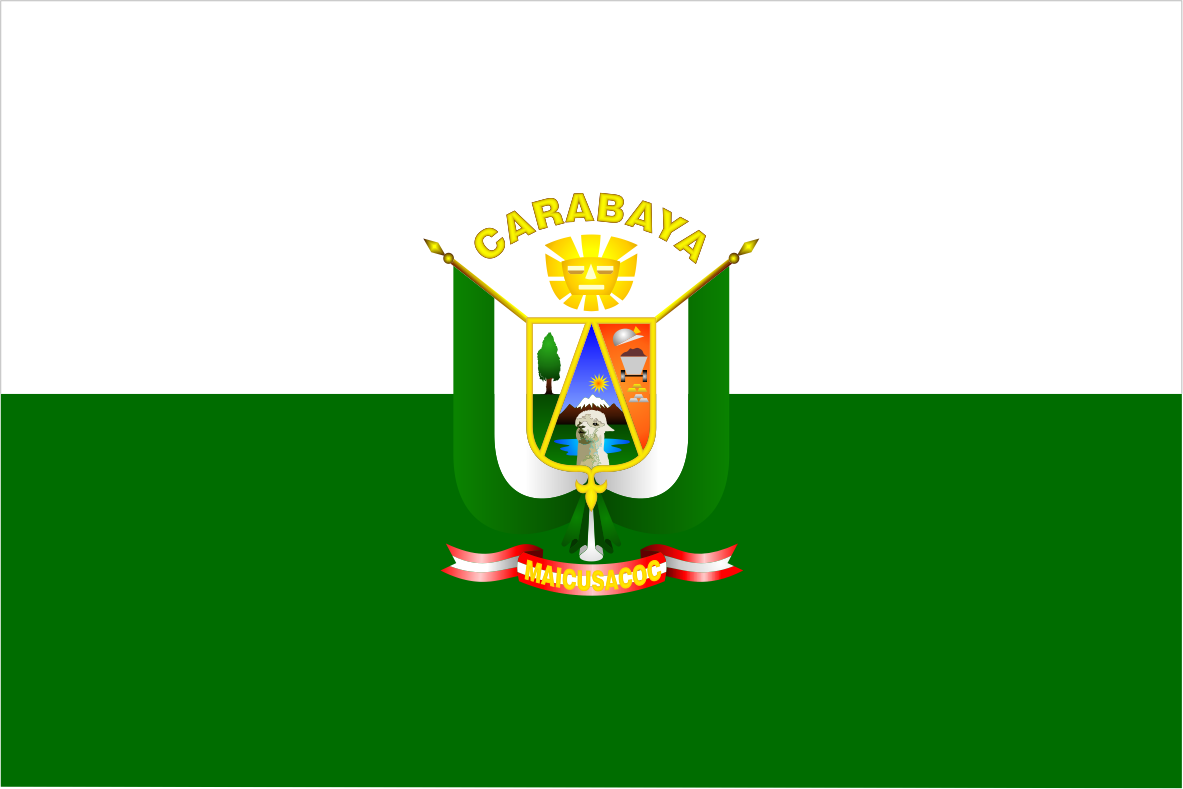
Macusani

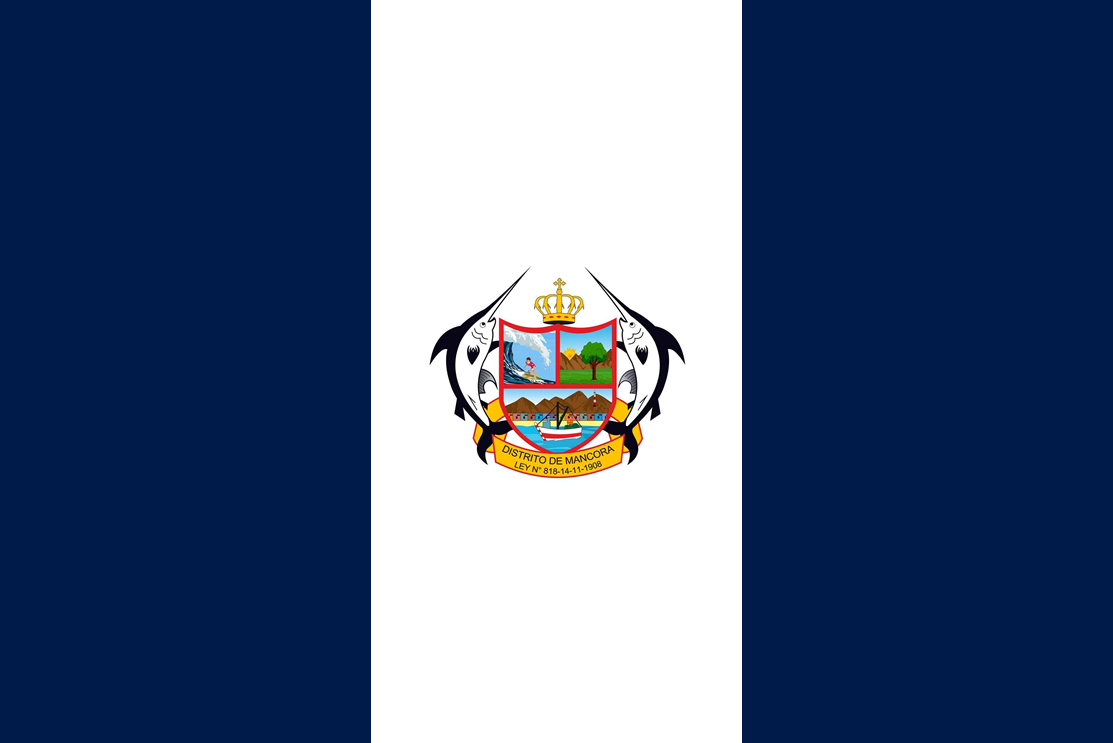
Máncora

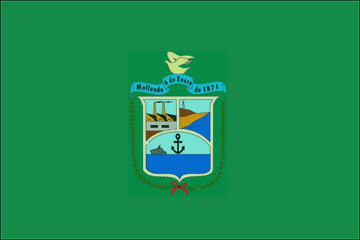
Mollendo

Moquegua

Moyobamba

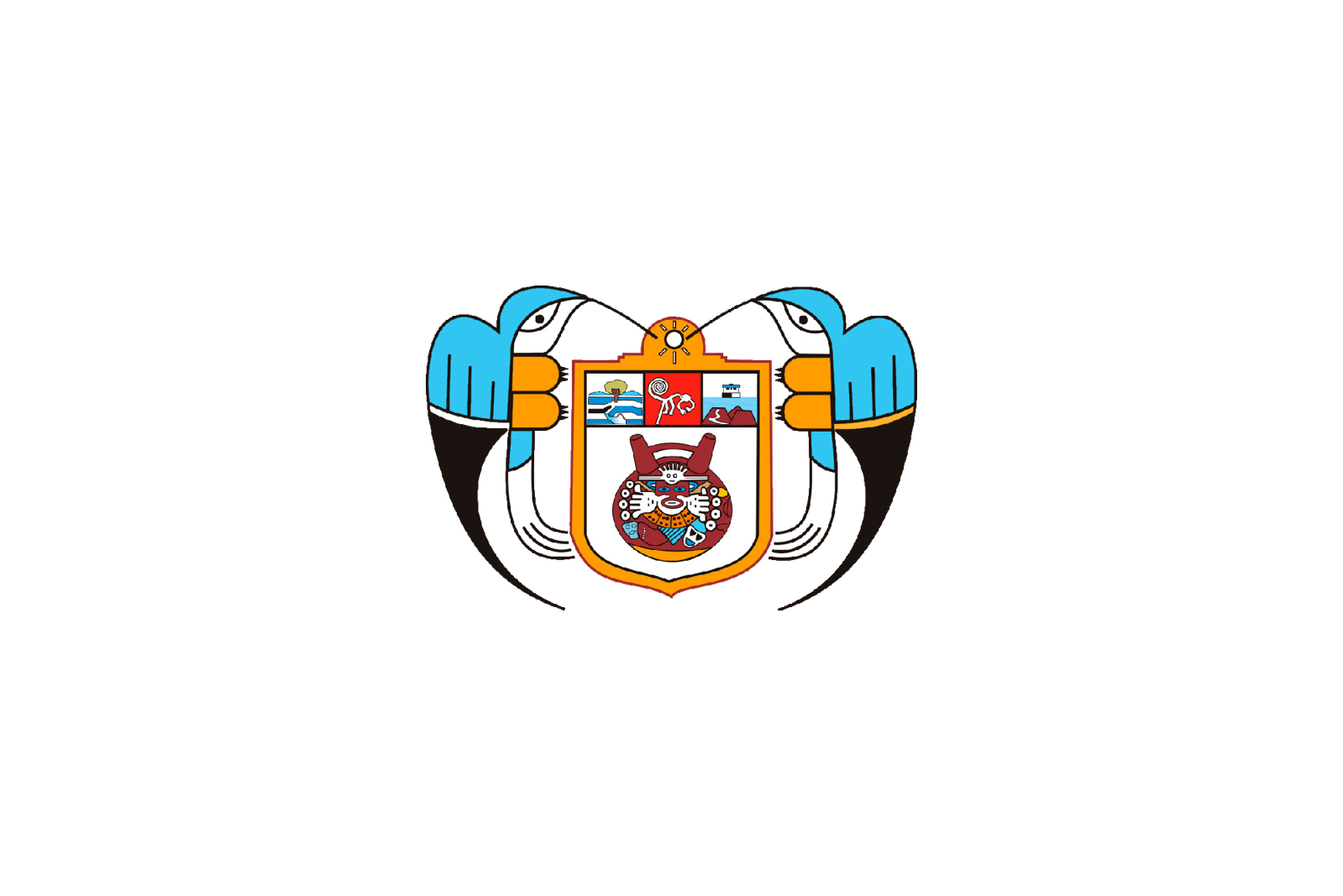
Nazca

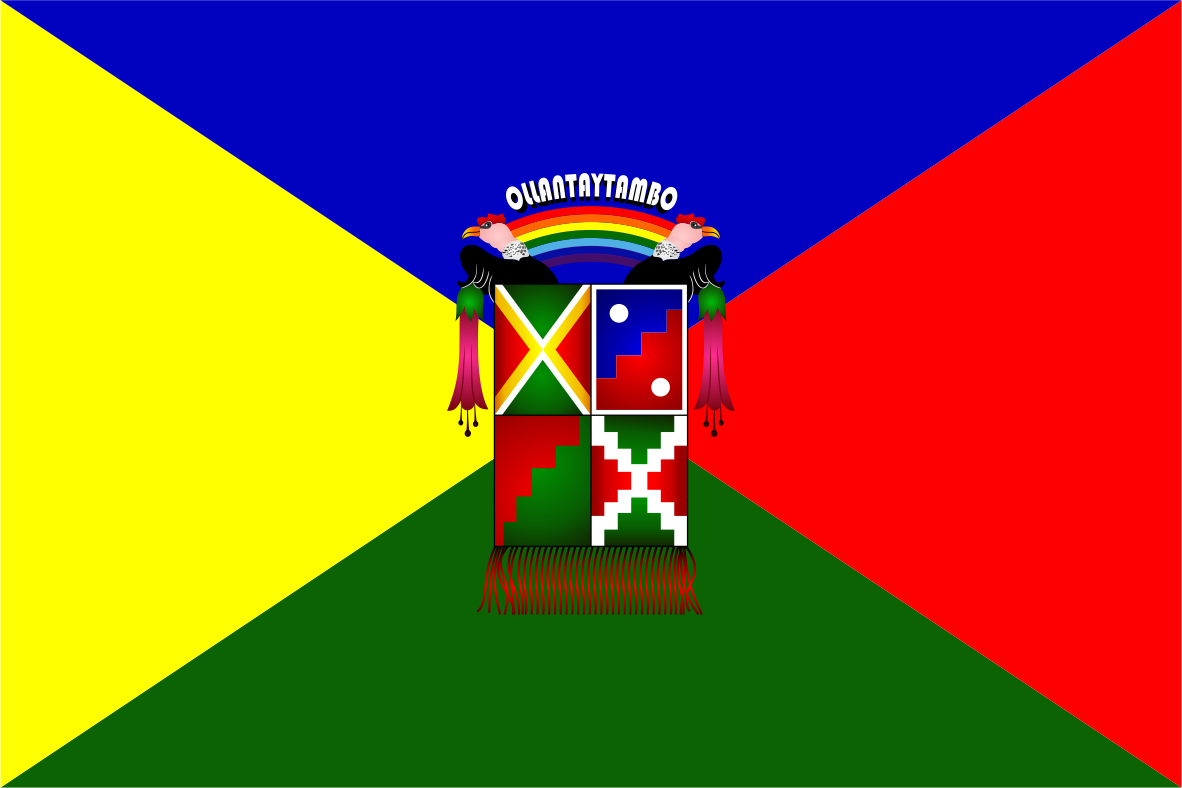
Ollantaytambo

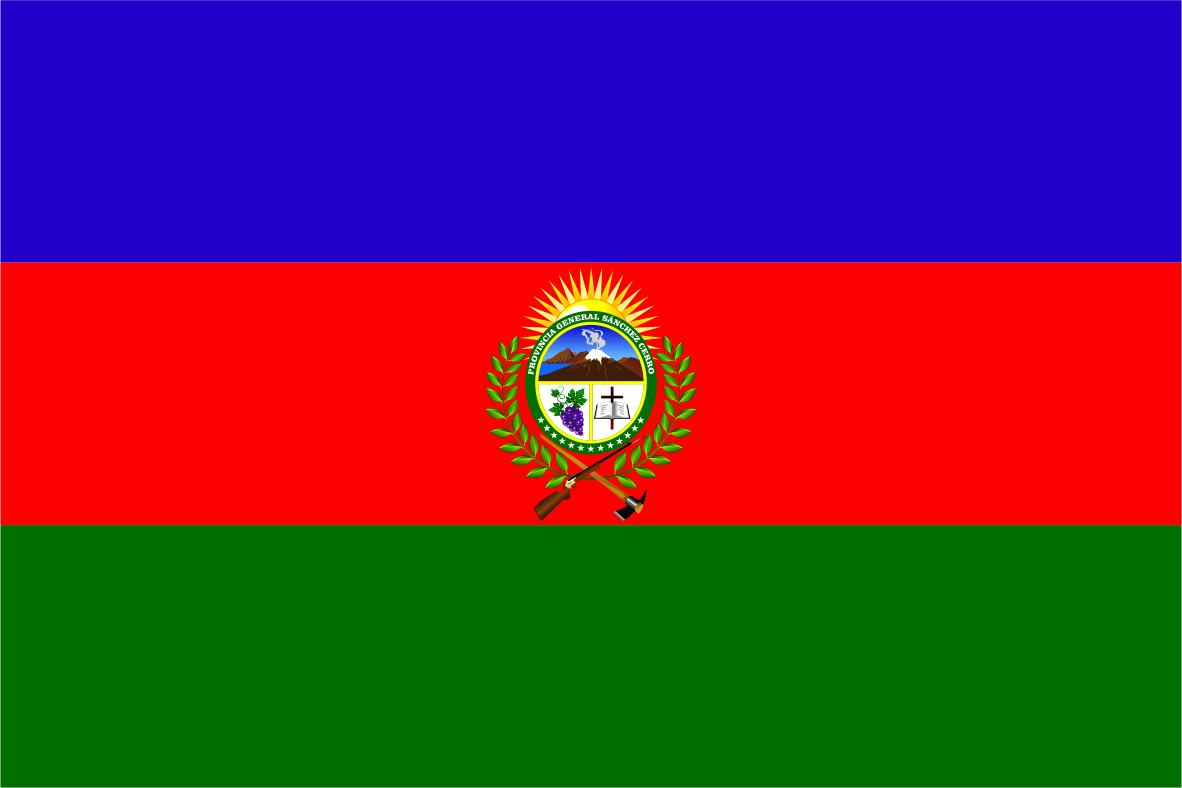
Omate

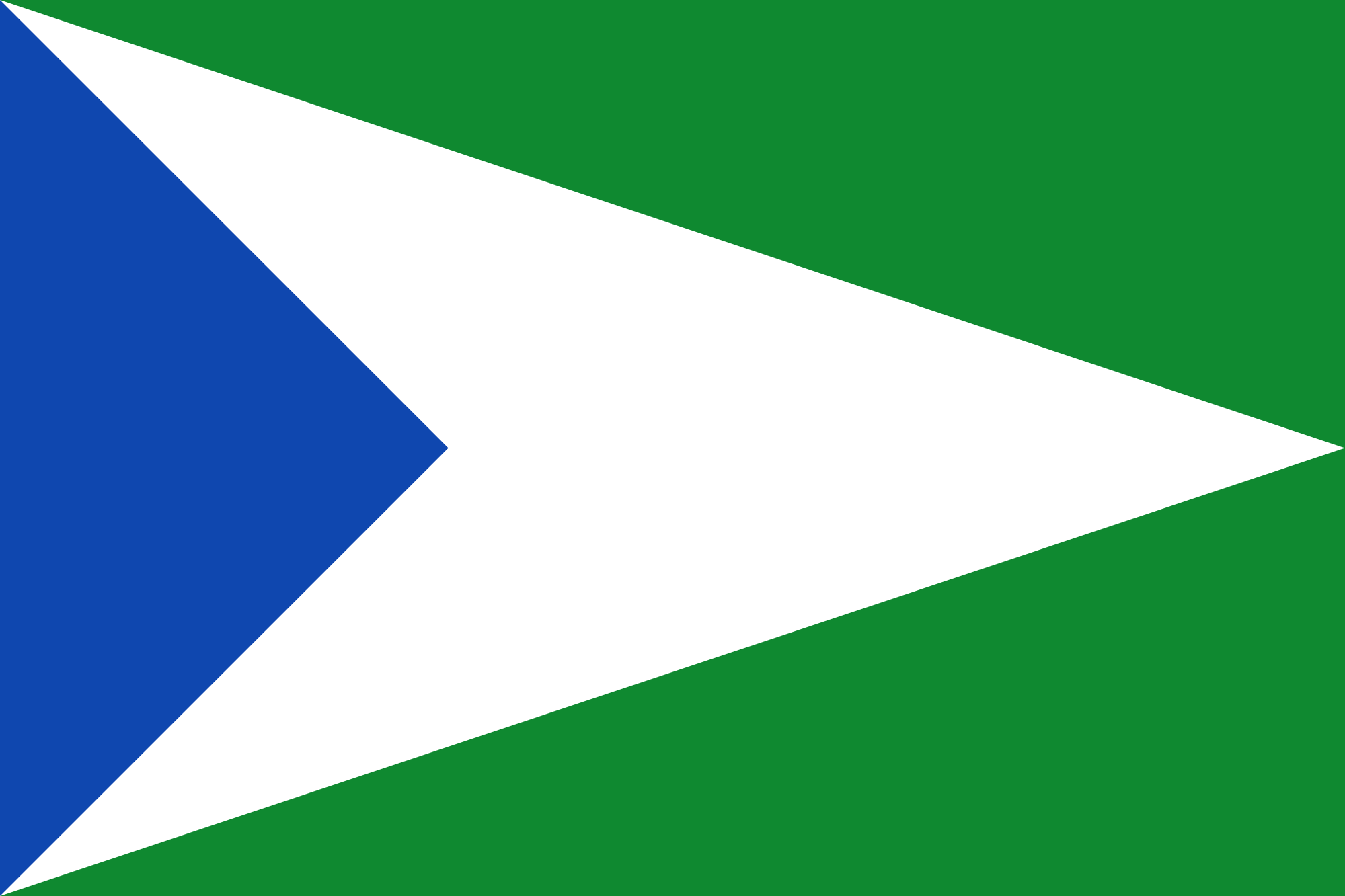
Oxapampa

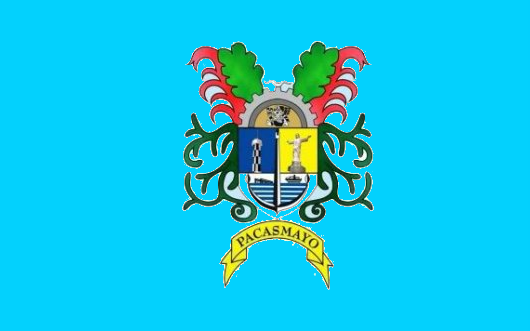
Pacasmayo

Paita

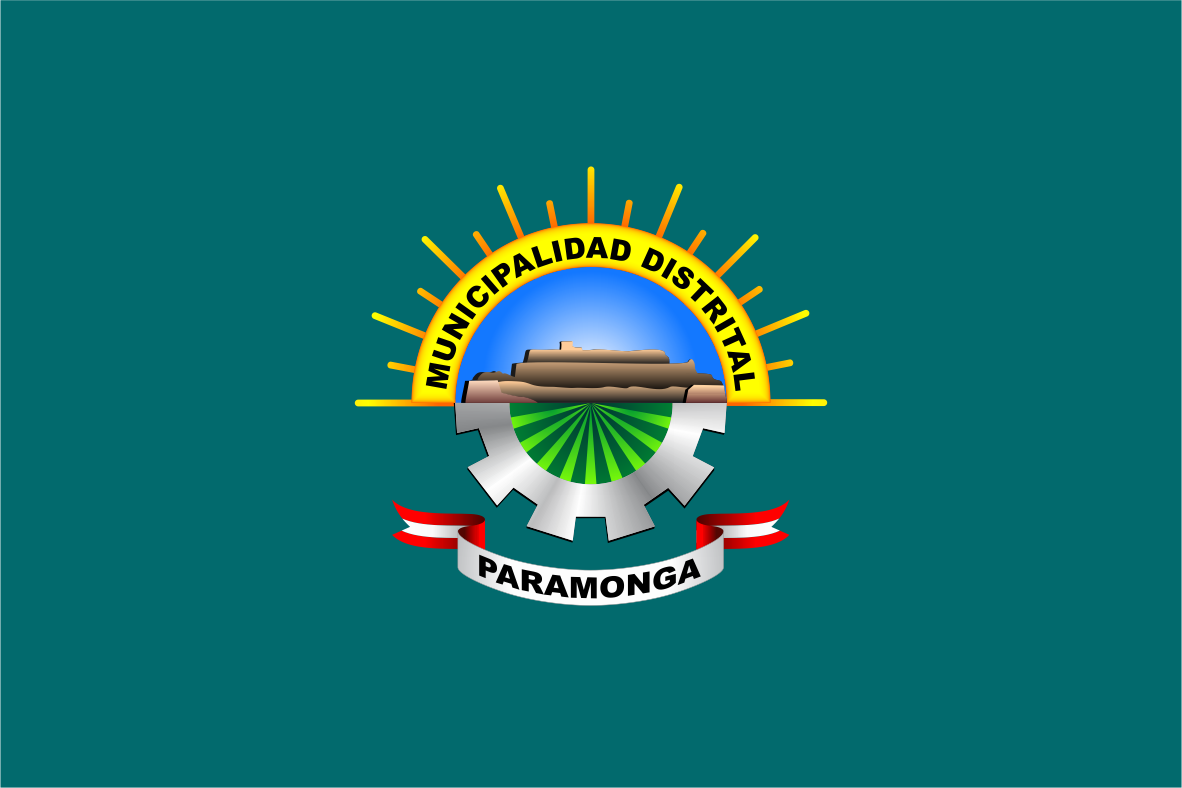
Paramonga

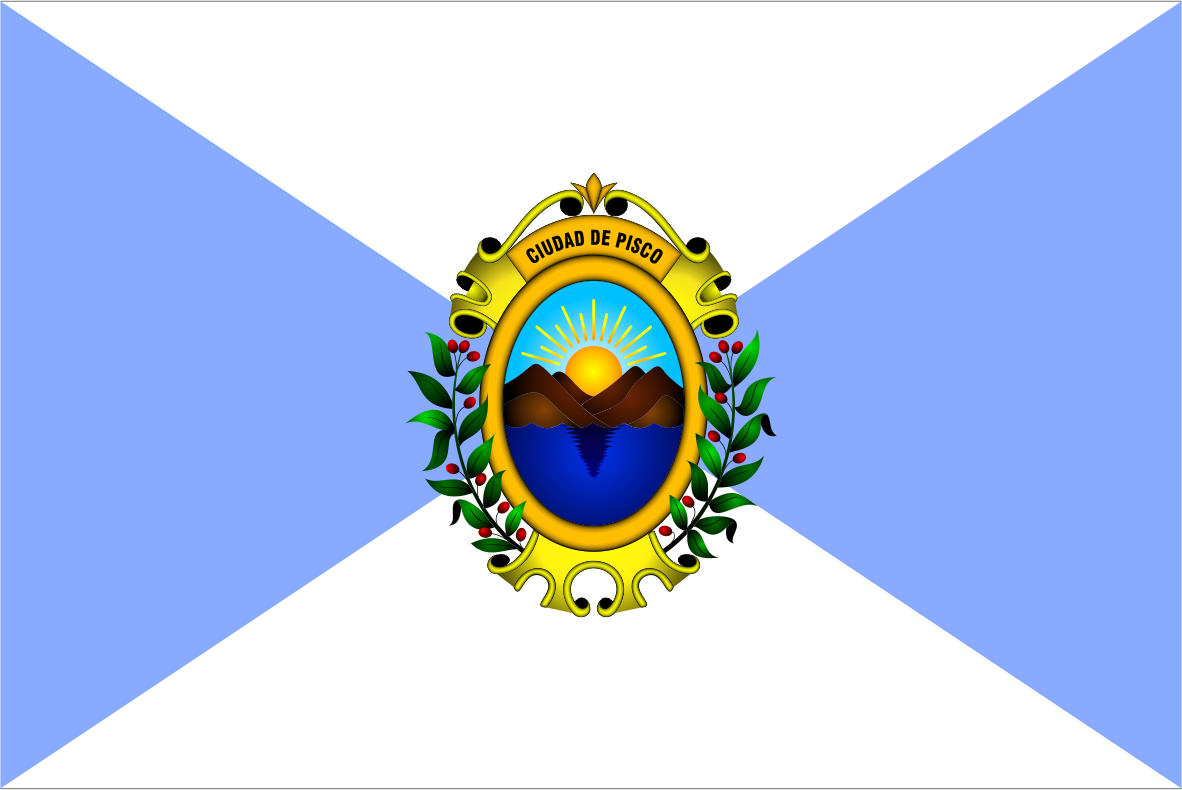
Pisco

Piura

Pozuzo

Pucallpa

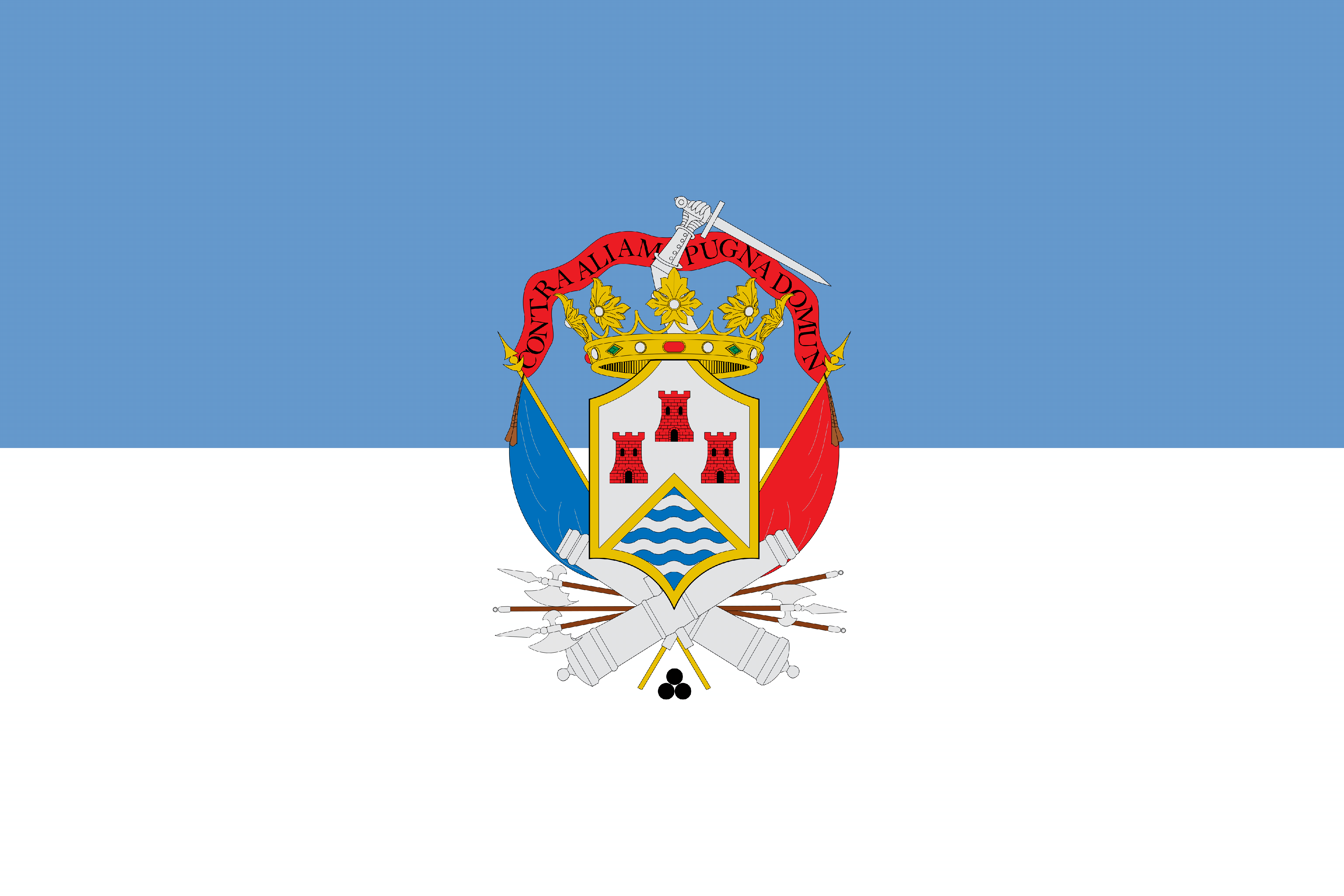
Puno

San Ignacio

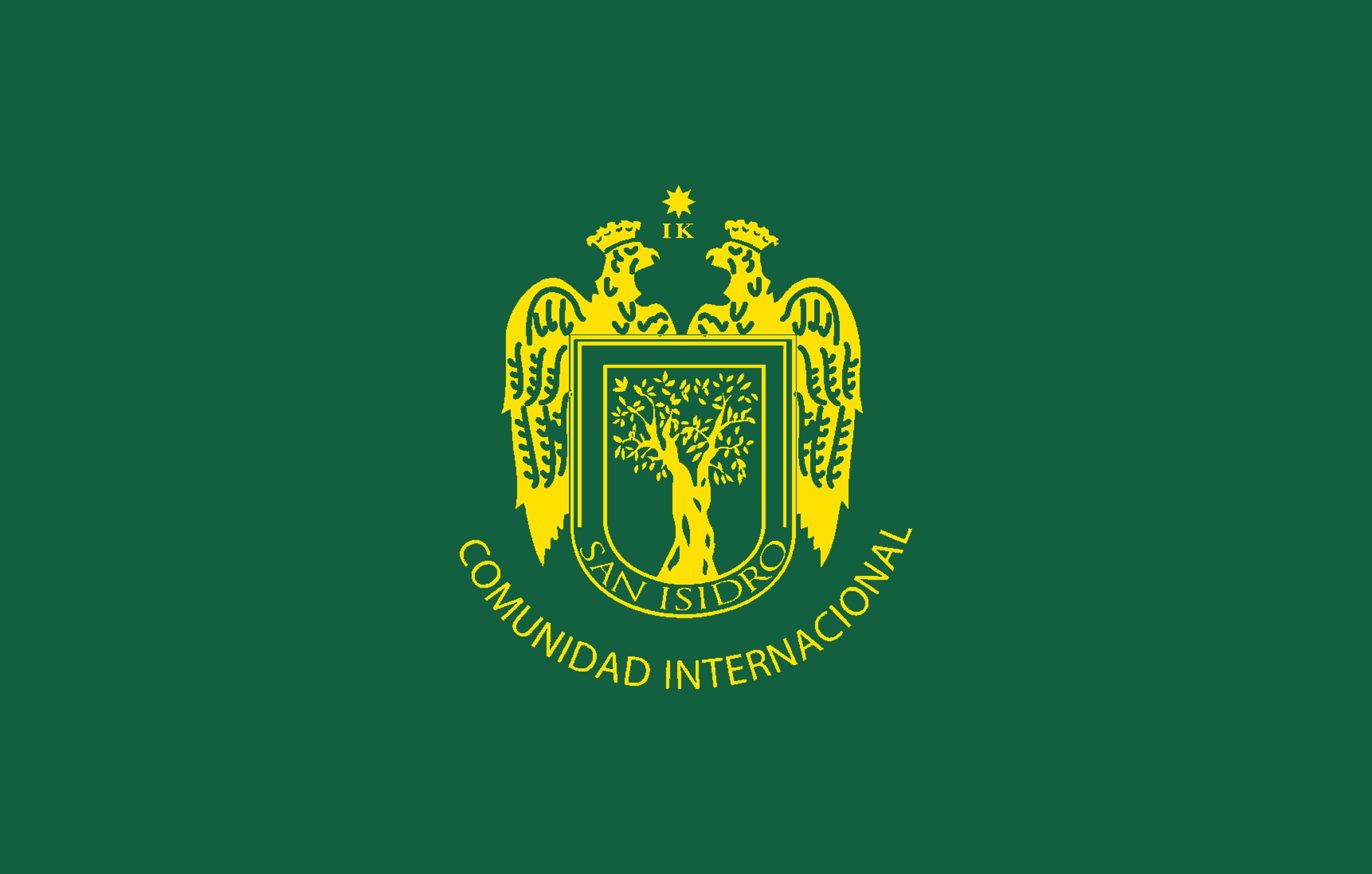
San Isidro District

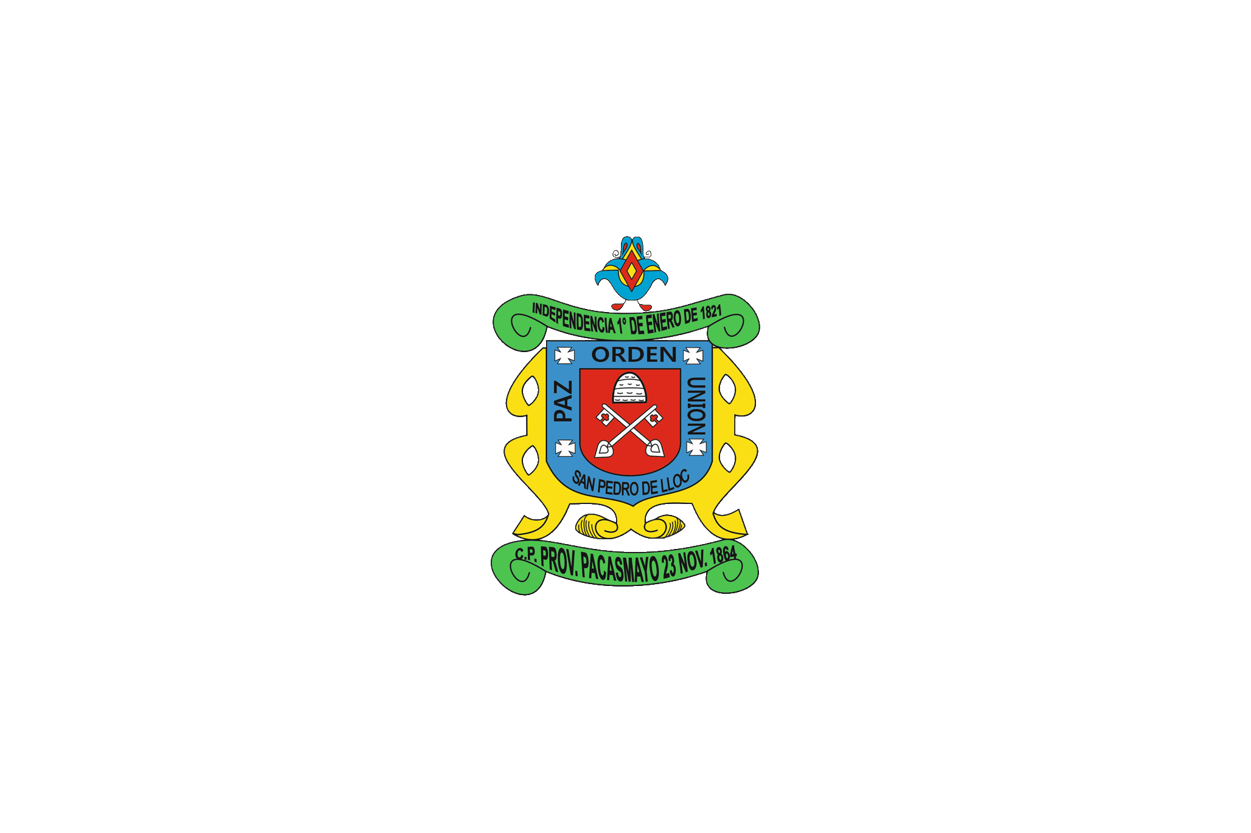
San Pedro de Lloc

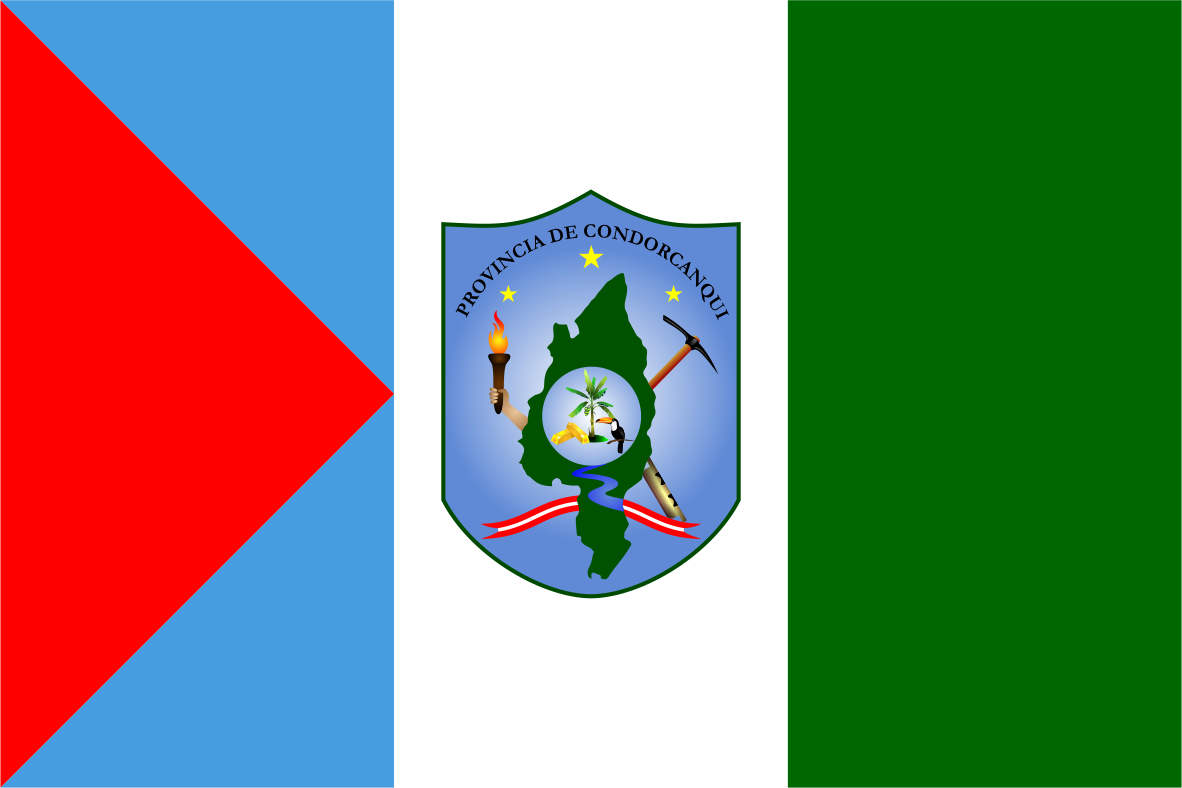
Santa María de Nieva

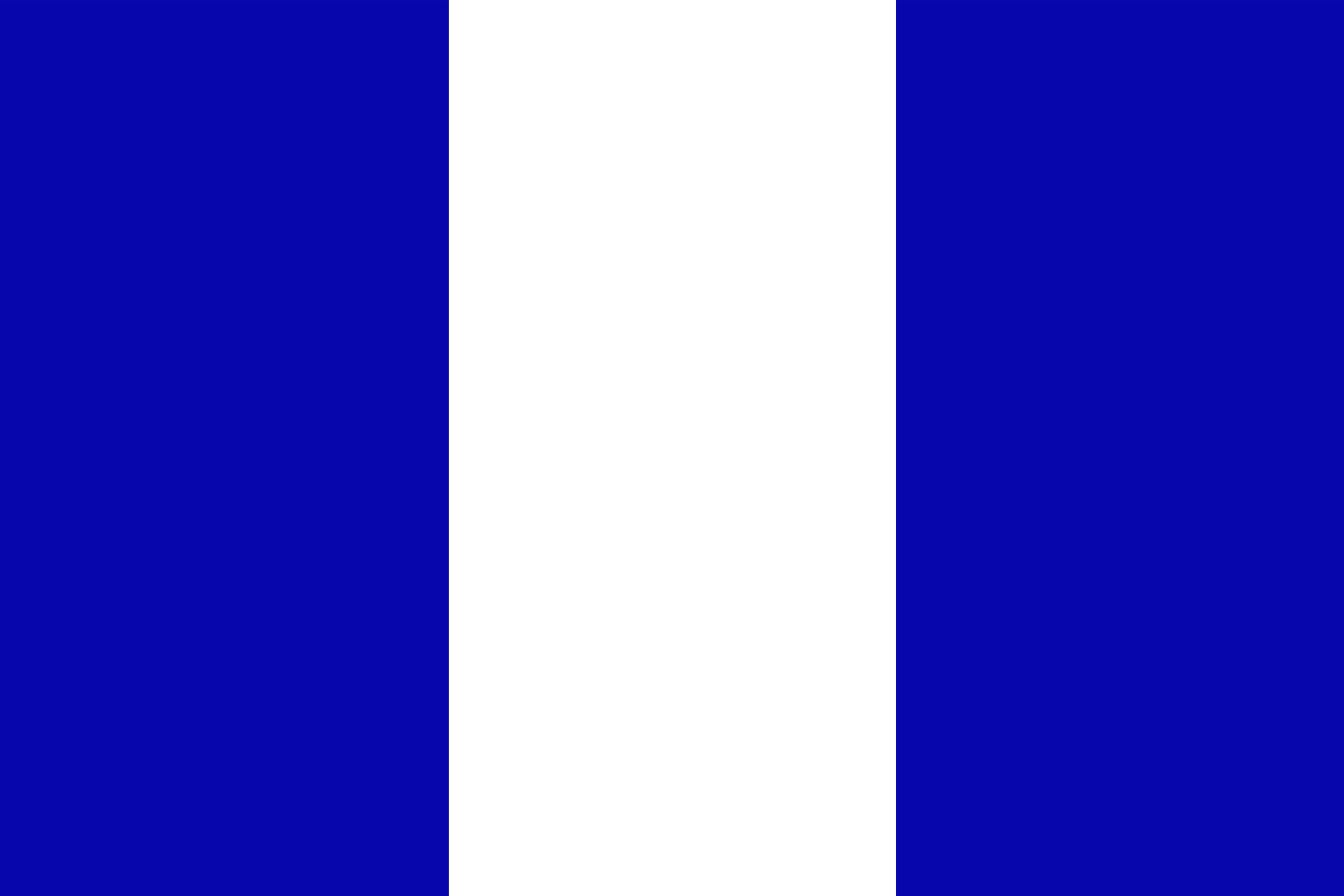
Santiago de Cao

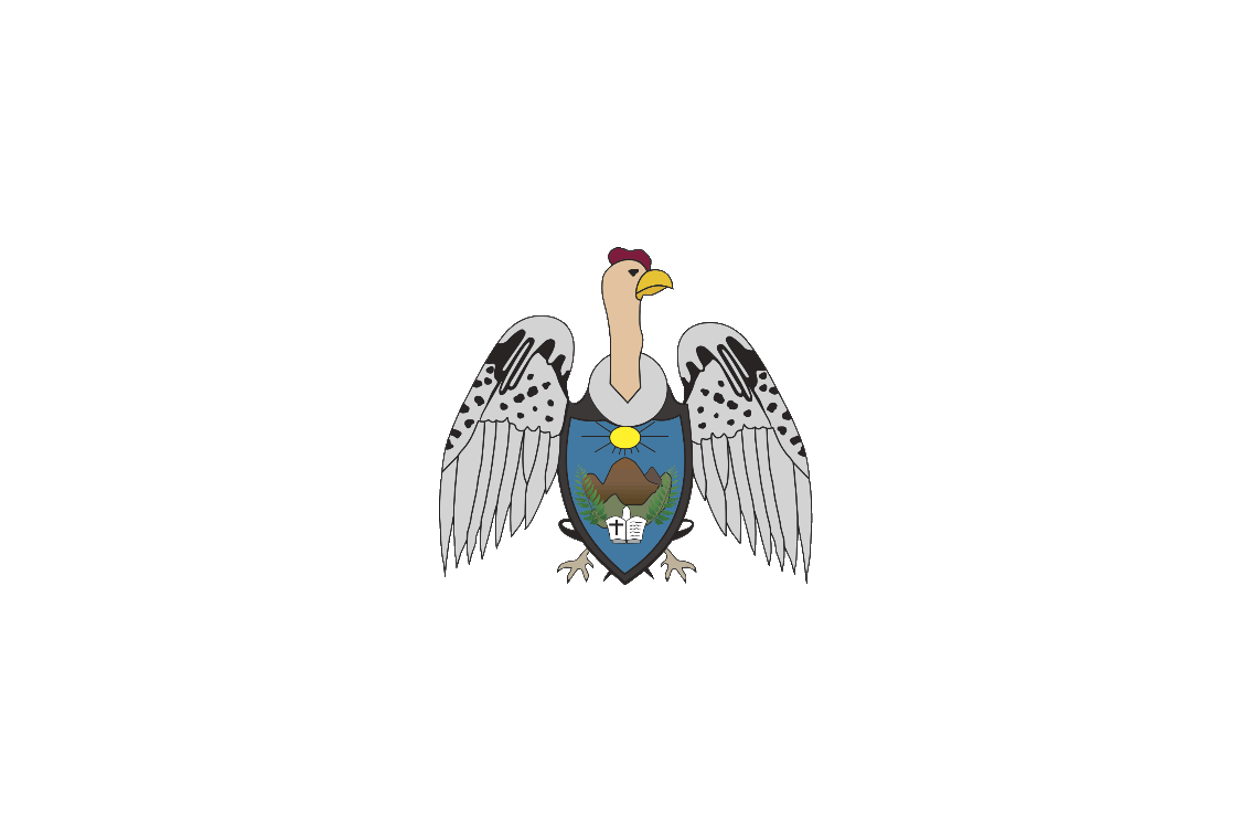
Santiago de Chuco

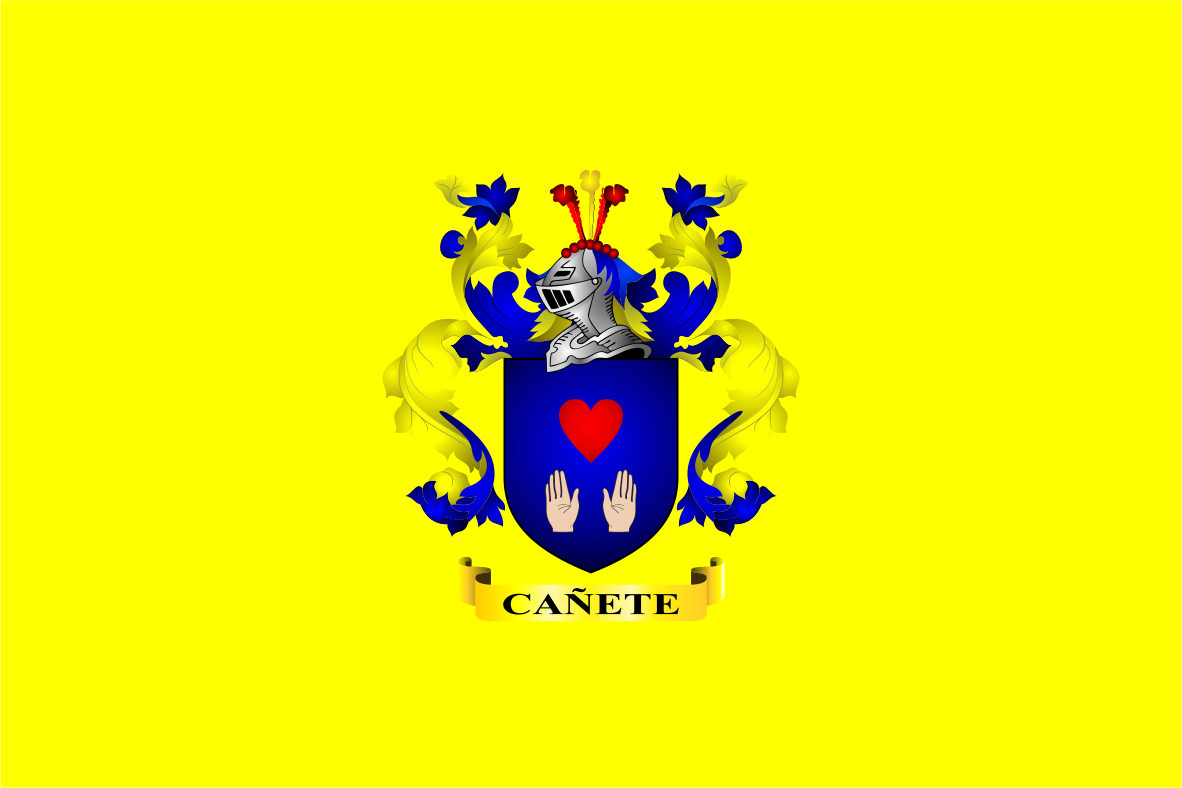
San Vicente de Cañete

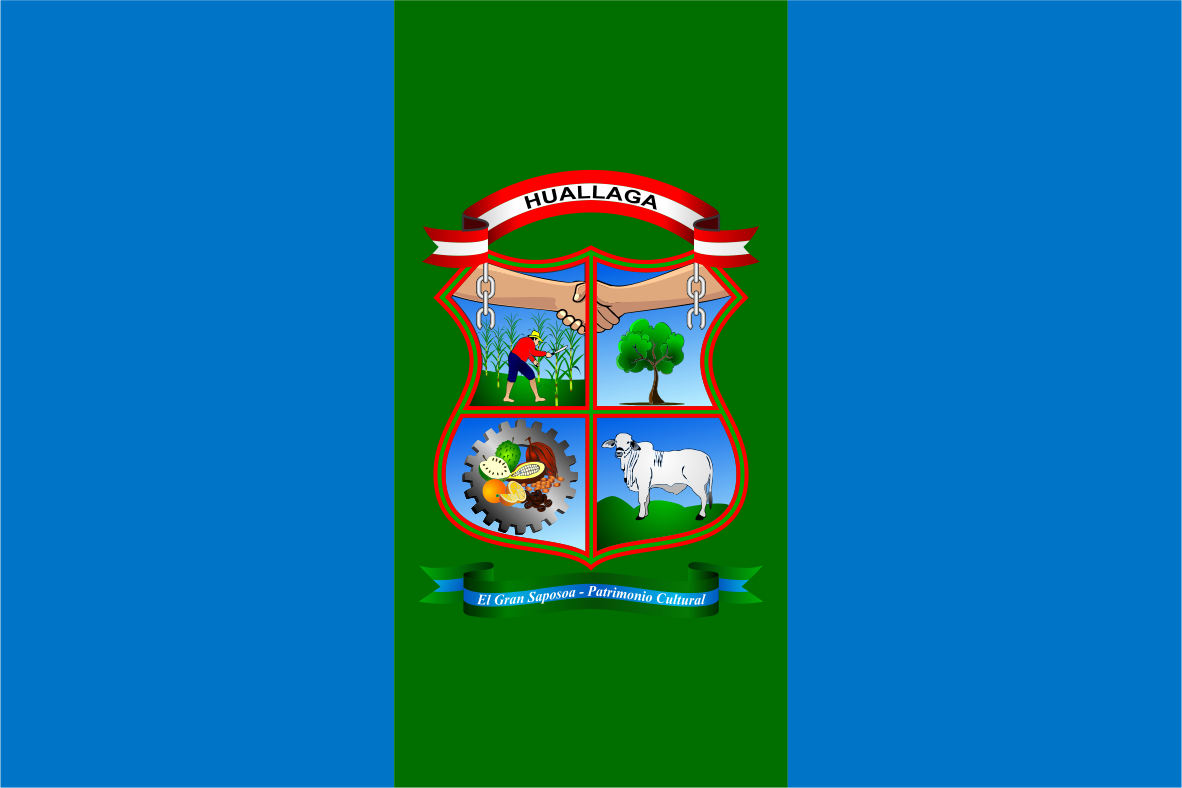
Saposoa

Sechura

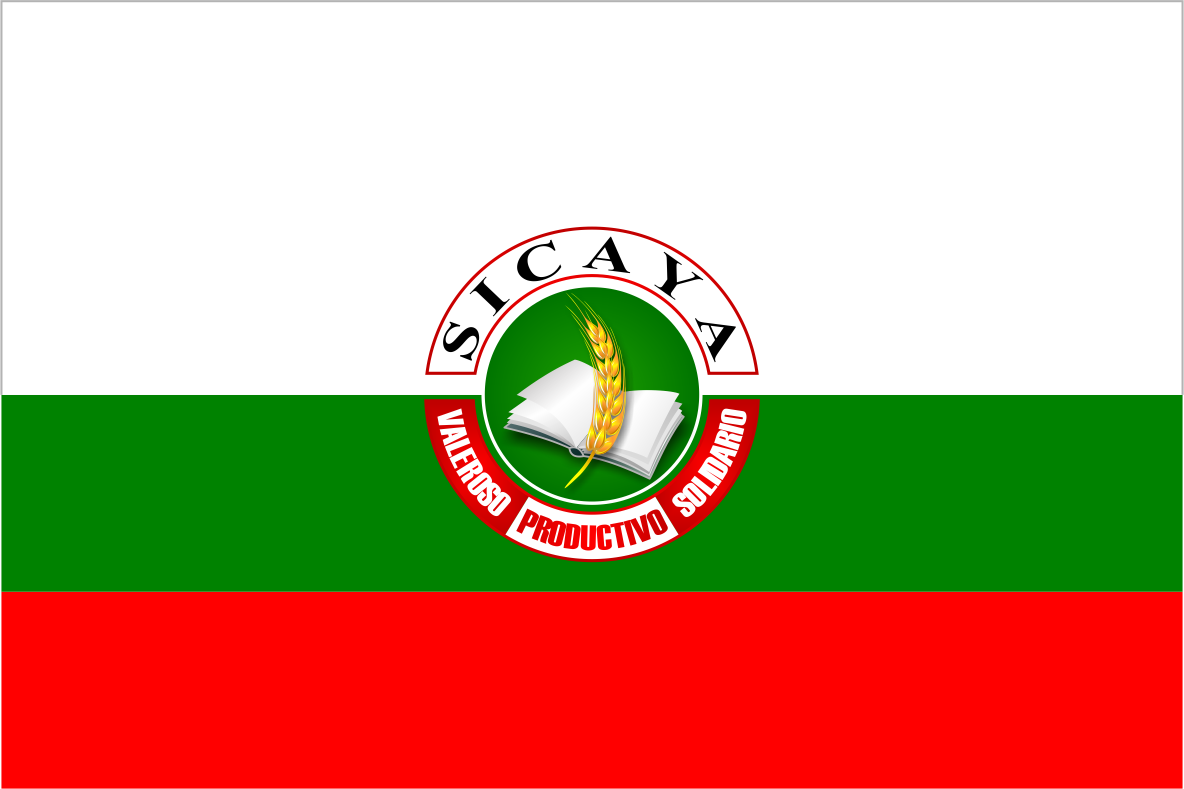
Sicaya

Sitabamba

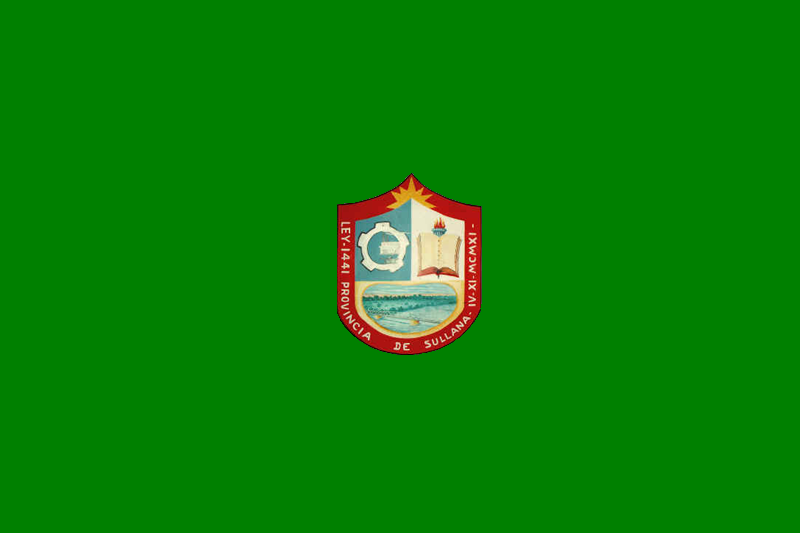
Sullana

Tacna

Tarapoto

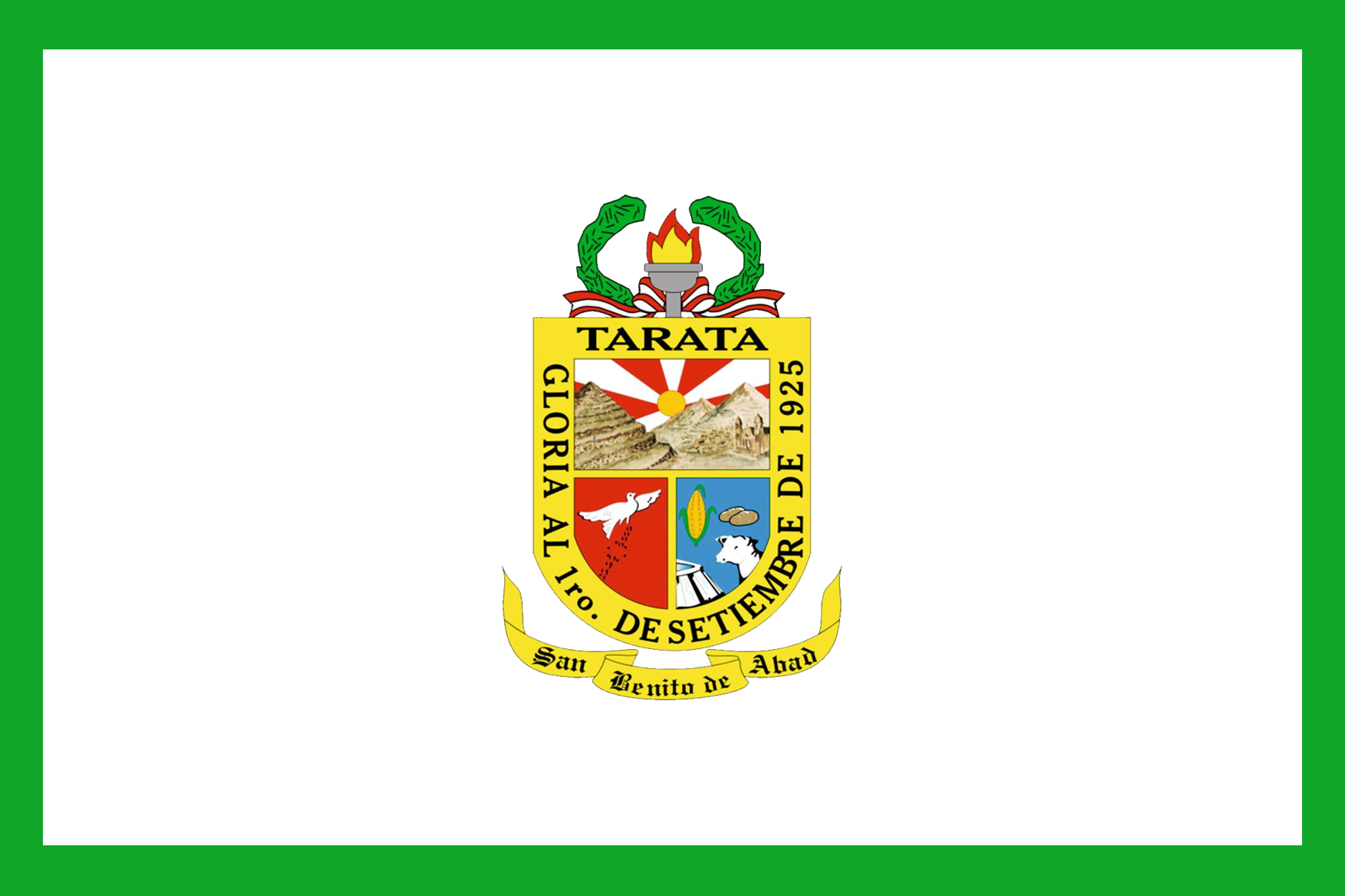
Tarata

Tarma

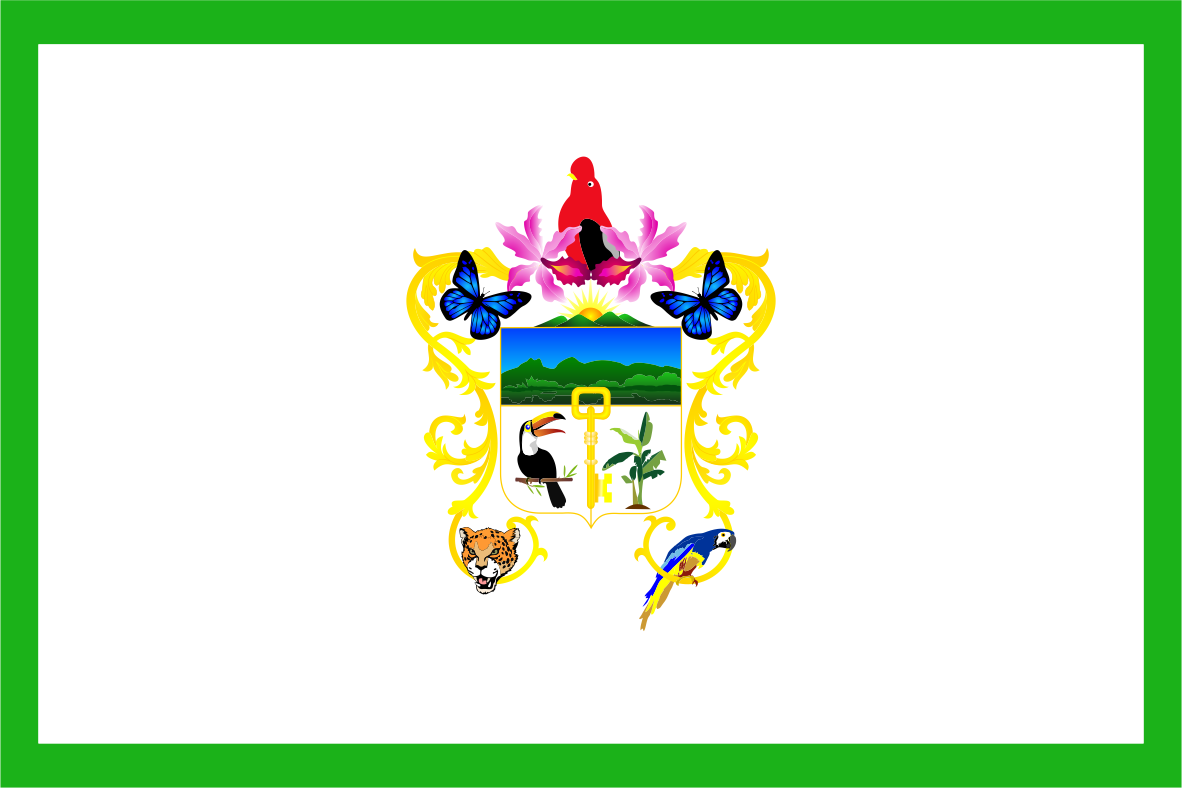
Tingo María

Trujillo

Tumbes

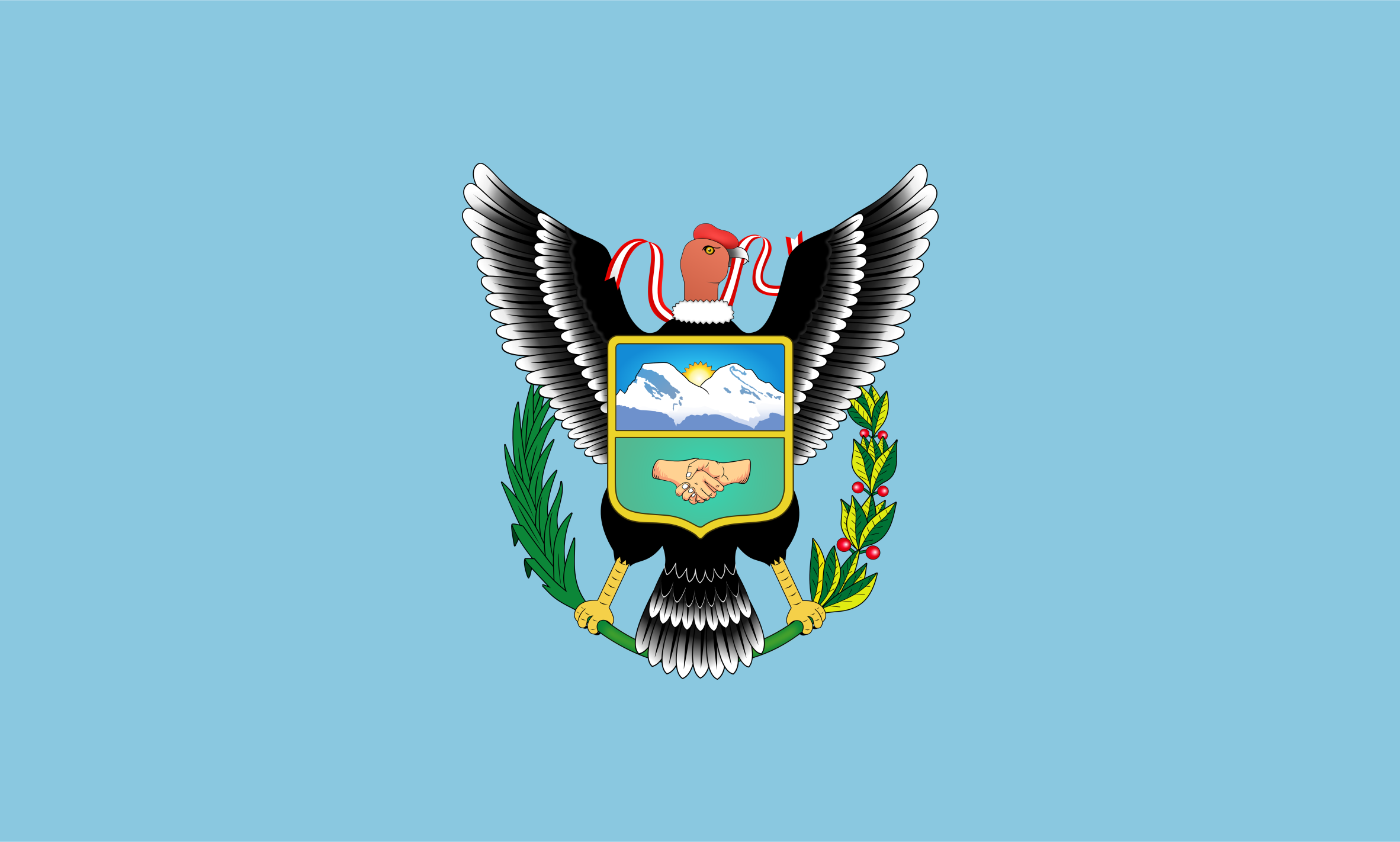
Yungay

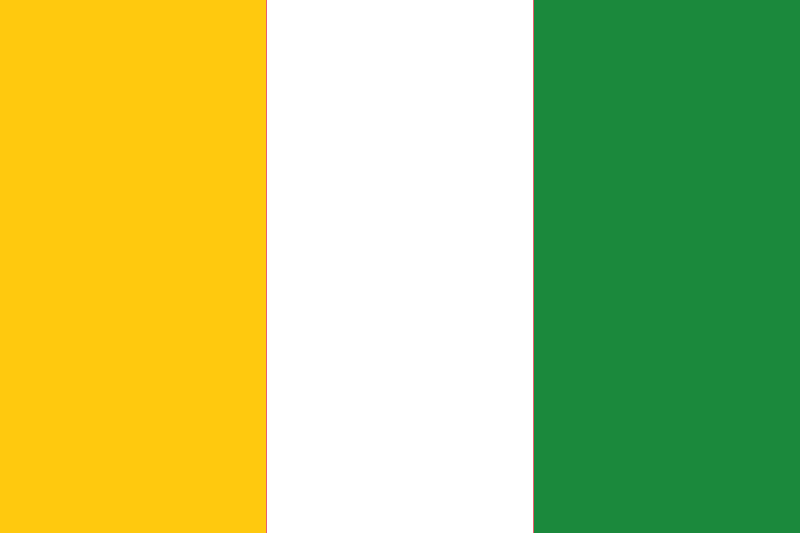
Yurimaguas

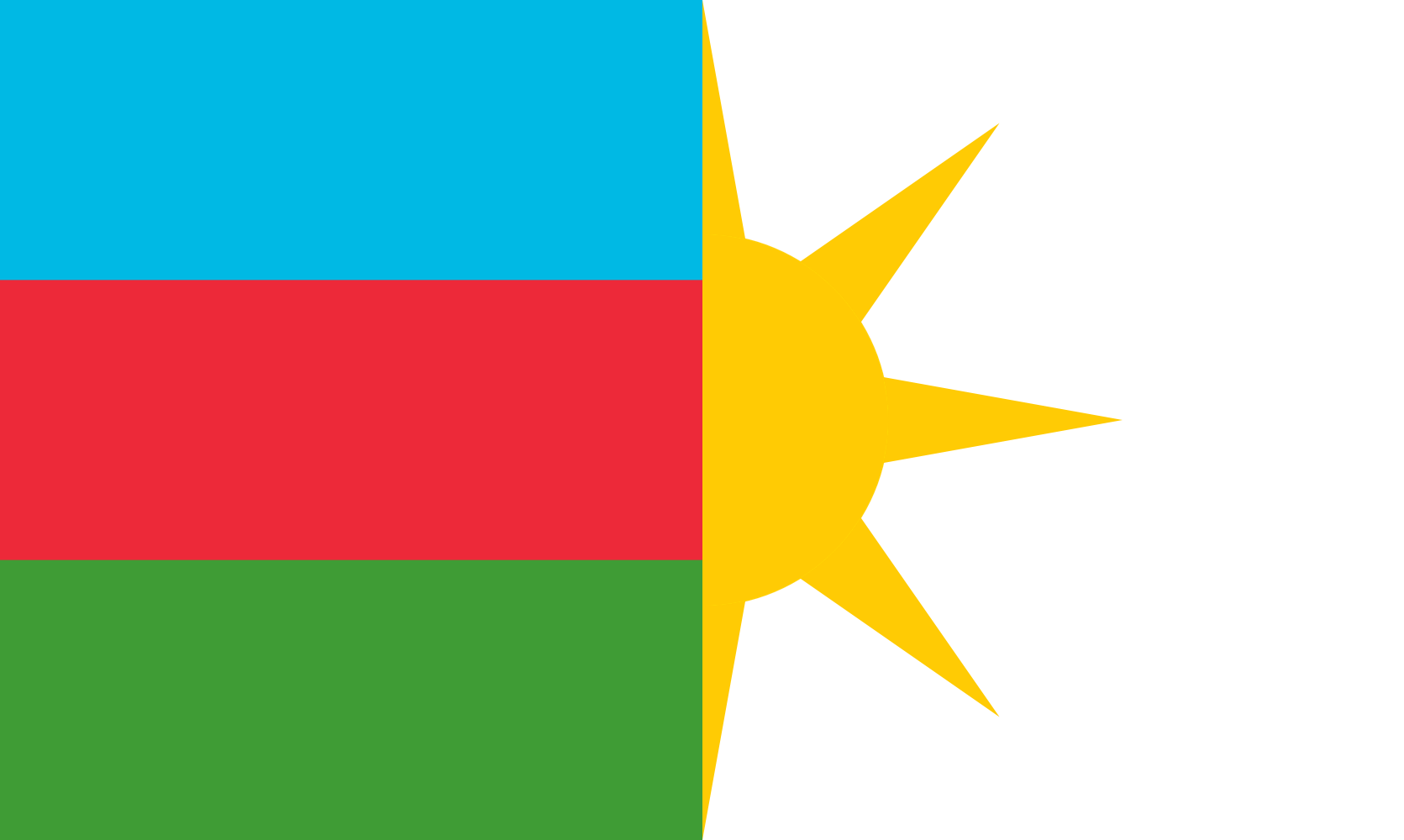
Zarumilla

=== Historical ===
Cusco (1540 - 1978)

Cusco (1978 - 2021)

== Uruguay ==
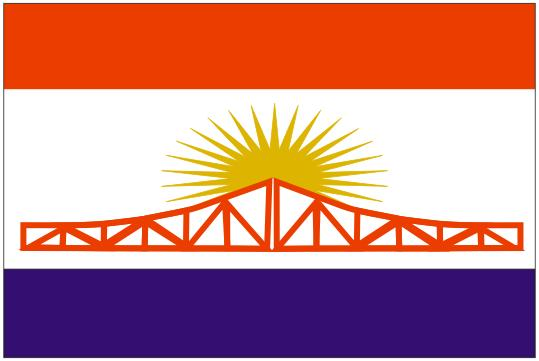
Carmelo

Chuy

Maldonado

Nueva Helvecia

Piriápolis

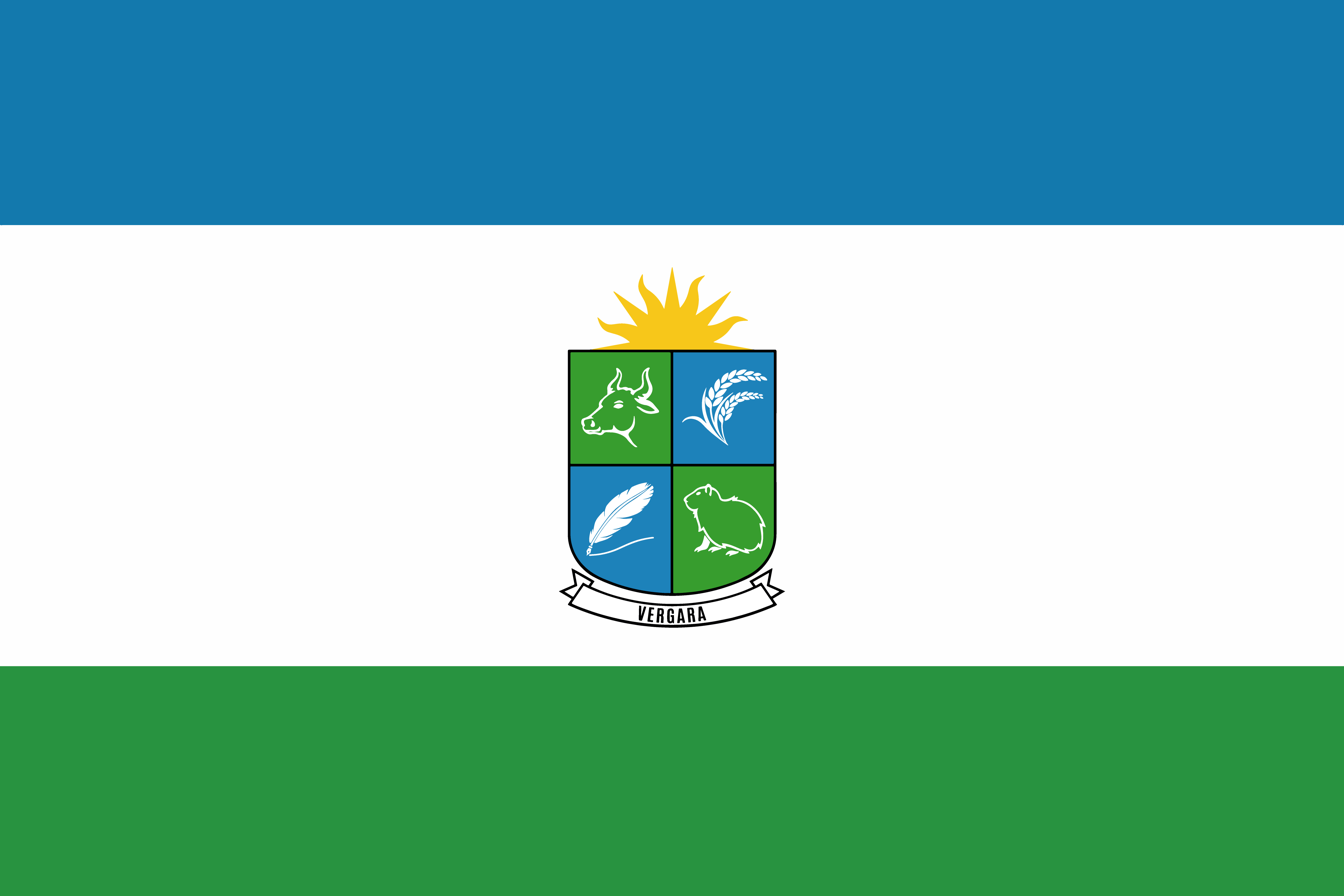
Vergara

== See also ==
- List of city flags in Africa
- List of city flags in Asia
- List of city flags in Europe
- List of city flags in North America
- List of city flags in Oceania
