= TV Ponta Verde =

TV Ponta Verde (ZYA 220)
- Maceió, Alagoas; Brazil
- Channels: Digital: 19 (UHF); Virtual: 5
- Branding: TV Ponta Verde

Programming
- Affiliations: SBT

Ownership
- Owner: Sistema Opinião de Comunicação; (TV Ponta Verde Ltda.)
- Sister stations: 95 Mais FM

History
- First air date: January 30, 1982
- Former names: TV Alagoas (1982–2016)
- Former channel numbers: Analog: 5 (VHF, 1982-2018)
- Former affiliations: Rede Manchete (1984-1996); CNT (1996-1999); Band (1999-2007); Rede Mundial (2009-2010)

Technical information
- Licensing authority: ANATEL
- ERP: 4.2 kW
- Transmitter coordinates: 9°39′19.7″S 35°43′30.6″W

Links
- Public license information: Profile
- Website: tvpontaverde.tv.br

TV Ponta Verde (channel 5) is an SBT-affiliated television station licensed to the city of Maceió, capital of the state of Alagoas, owned by Sistema Opinião de Comunicação. Second oldest television station in the state (after TV Gazeta de Alagoas), it was founded as TV Alagoas by politician Geraldo Sampaio.

== History ==
=== TV Alagoas (1982-2016) ===
TV Alagoas went on air on January 30, 1982, as an affiliate of SBT. In its local programming, one of its main programs was A Vez do Povo na TV, a social program, based on O Povo na TV, which was shown on the network. The affiliation lasted until April 1984, when the station became affiliated with Rede Manchete.

In 1996, the station left Rede Manchete, which showed the first signs of loss of audience and the crisis that would lead to its shutdown in 1999, joining CNT, placing even more emphasis on local programming. One of the highlights of the line-up was Satelitur, shown via satellite throughout Brazil and some countries in Latin America. This tourism program highlighted the beauties of the state, presented on Saturdays by journalist Gilka Mafra.

On November 8, 1999, the station left CNT, which was also facing a crisis, loss of audience and affiliates, becoming an affiliate of Band. With the new affiliation, the station's programming schedule also changed, with some programs being extinguished and others gaining greater prominence.

In 2005, the owners invested in modernizing the station, which gained new image and sound, using equipment with MPEG-2 technology, now offering excellent signal reception. In the same year, TV Alagoas began generating a satellite signal on StarOne C12, transmitting throughout Latin America and parts of North America.

After almost 8 years with the Band signal, TV Alagoas returns to its origins and started airing the SBT signal again on February 12, 2007. On the same day, in celebration of SBT's return to the state, the broadcaster promoted a carnival party for around 600 distinguished guests. With the end of the affiliation, Band was relayed on UHF channel 38. SBT's return to television in Alagoas took place after seven months off the air, when TV Pajuçara, a former SBT affiliate since 1992, began broadcasting, on July 23, 2006, programming from Rede Record.

==== Lease to the Worldwide Church of God's Power ====
On the morning of September 14, 2009, in an unexpected move, TV Alagoas stopped showing SBT programming and started broadcasting programming from Rede Mundial, linked to the Worldwide Church of God's Power, to which it sold 22 hours of its programming, being the network's second outlet on channel 5.

After the opening of the program Plantão Alagoas, presenter Oscar de Melo read the note on air that the owners adopted this attitude to prevent TV Alagoas from going bankrupt. In the note, the owners of TV Alagoas accuse the State Government of passing on almost all of the public funds to TV Pajuçara and TV Gazeta, linked respectively to the senators João Tenório (first deputy of the governor Teotônio Vilela Filho, took office with his inauguration in the state government) and Fernando Collor de Mello (son of the deceased senator Arnon de Mello, owner of the group that bears his name and owns the AM and FM radio stations Gazeta, TV Gazeta and the newspaper Gazeta de Alagoas). Viewers' reactions to the change of programming across the state were immediate. The sudden change angered viewers in Alagoas, who complained about numerous phone calls and e-mails to the broadcaster through various websites in the following days. SBT was only received in Alagoas through satellite signals and subscription TV.

On September 17, SBT released a statement to the press, in which it declared itself surprised after learning, through notes published in the press and messages from viewers, that its programming, then broadcast by TV Alagoas, had been taken off the air and that the contract between the broadcasters, valid until 2012, had been broken. Due to the abrupt disaffiliation, the executive director of SBT, Guilherme Stoliar, filed a lawsuit in the 31st Civil Court of São Paulo against TV Alagoas, which ordered the immediate return of SBT programming, to guarantee the network's signal on the air in Alagoas. In addition to filing an injunction, the director met with the minister of communications Helio Costa, in Brasília, to discuss the invasion of evangelical churches on Brazilian TV. Silvio Santos and network directors complain about the departure of former affiliates by networks that show evangelical religious programs. The determination was not met by TV Alagoas, which did not comment on the process.

On Orkut, the official TV Alagoas community was attacked daily with messages of protest from viewers against the programming of the Worldwide Church of the Power of God, with harsh criticism, including profanity against the station's owners and the church. In November, the State Communication Conference released a harsh note criticizing the broadcaster for showing exorcism on people during unloading sessions, claiming that communications vehicles are public concessions and should be used by all Brazilian people. After TV Alagoas changed SBT for Rede Mundial, the station only produced two local programs: Plantão Alagoas and Panorama Alagoas. The majority of the line-up came to be made up of World Church programs.

Immediately, the station's programming with SBT, which competed for audience with TVs Gazeta and Pajuçara, ranking between 2nd and 3rd position and in 1st with Plantão Alagoas, fell to the last position of VHF stations. In the following weeks, the broadcaster expanded religious programs from the local church, until then only from São Paulo. The broadcaster only has an audience for Plantão Alagoas and Panorama Alagoas, as the audience for religious programs from the only church is almost zero or just a trace (when there is no one watching the station).

In January 2010, witnesses stated on blogs and websites that trucks were seen constantly entering and leaving the station. According to information, the broadcaster was assembling a new transmission tower to replace the old one. The broadcaster only confirmed the information in February. In March, the broadcaster's director, Patrícia Sampaio, announced during the premiere of the new Plantão Alagoas set, in which the station had been investing over the last six months, the news in the programming schedule: the TV signal was expanded to the entire state of Alagoas, the tower was enlarged and new transmitters have already been installed. She says that the broadcaster will not show SBT again, despite complaints from viewers, and did not give further explanation about the refusal.

In the same month, the station was accused of using images from the premiere of Conexão Repórter (from SBT), which denounced cases of pedophilia among Catholic clergy in Arapiraca, in the interior of the state. Plantão Alagoas used images from the program without authorization, amid the terrible relationship between TV Alagoas and SBT caused by the unexpected disaffiliation. The attitude of the Alagoan station was considered image piracy. In May, it was SBT's turn to do the same, this time showing images on news bulletins, of the deaths of 20 babies in a maternity hospital in Maceió, putting the following credit "Images: SBT - TV Alagoas", as if it were still affiliated with the network.

On April 11, Geraldo Sampaio, owner and owner of the station since its inauguration in 1982, died at 3:30 pm, at Arthur Ramos Memorial Hospital due to multiple organ failure, caused by kidney and liver problems.

On May 12, the UOL announced that from June 1, the station would return to broadcasting SBT programming, with a new agreement lasting ten years, more than the 5 years of the previous one (2007–2012). “TV Alagoas regretted switching from SBT to Rede Mundial and is now backtracking due to pressure from viewers”, assessed SBT's national network director, Guilherme Stoliar. According to information released by the press, it was the pressure and complaints from viewers, SBT executives, the excess of religious programming and almost no entertainment content, that the station's IBOPE went to the brink, leading TV Alagoas to decide to terminate the contract and return to the old network, after 8 months. The news about the return of SBT in Alagoas was confirmed by SBT on March 13, which according to the network, since TV Alagoas left SBT for Rede Mundial, "the station's audience dropped practically to zero points". After the disaffiliation, the Igreja Mundial do Poder de Deus started to occupy only 2 hours of the station's programming (from 10:45 am to 12:45 pm), and the delay in paying the lease was one of the main reasons for SBT's return to the station's programming.

On May 31, 2010, at 11 pm, the station ended the church's programming to show a special program for the return of SBT in Alagoas, lasting 15 minutes. SBT's programming returned at the time of Conexão Repórter, around 11:30 pm, 15 minutes after the start of the program.

On September 29, 2011, Manoel Sampaio Luz Neto, better known as Juca Sampaio, CEO of TV Alagoas, died at 3:45 am in the ICU of Hospital do Coração in São Paulo, as a result of septic shock, following surgery for an umbilical hemorrhage. He had been in the hospital since the 23rd and was the son of the former vice-governor of Alagoas, Geraldo Sampaio who died in 2010. Juca's body arrived on the same day in Maceió. After Juca's death, Patrícia Sampaio, as the family representant, started to administrate the station full time.

==== Sale to Sistema Opinião de Comunicação ====
On October 13, 2014, the broadcaster's management issued a note through its official Facebook page informing the sale of 58% of its shares to a group, which at the beginning of the year had already acquired part of the shares of TV Ponta Negra, from Natal, and formed Sistema Opinião de Comunicação.

=== TV Ponta Verde (2016-presente) ===
After acquiring the 42% of the shares that were still owned by the Sampaio family, Sistema Opinião de Comunicação became the full owner of TV Alagoas. However, the station's name was registered by the former owners, who prohibited the new management from continuing to use the brand. In May 2016, the broadcaster abandoned the old nomenclature and launched the "Qual Vai Ser?" contest, for viewers to vote for the new name of the broadcaster and compete for a television set, as had already been done with another station in the group, TV Clube (today TV Norte Paraíba) from João Pessoa, Paraíba. On June 9, during Plantão Alagoas, the station announced the result of the contest and also the new identity, TV Ponta Verde, chosen by 111,364 viewers.

On April 10, 2025, the station began transmitting its signal via satellite on Ku band on the SAT HD Regional system on virtual channel 4.

== Technical information ==
Virtual channel	Digital channel	Screen	Content
19.1	5 UHF	1080i	TV Ponta Verde/SBT's main schedule

The station started its digital broadcasts on June 18, 2015, with local and national programming in standard definition. Around four years later, it started airing networked SBT programming in high definition. Its local programming wouldn't convert to high definition until July 26, 2021.

The station shut down its analog signal on VHF channel 5 on May 30, 2018, following the official ANATEL roadmap. The signal shut down at 11:59pm, during Programa do Ratinho, when it inserted the MCTIC and ANATEL slide about the switch-off.

== Programming ==
As well as relaying SBT's national programming, currently TV Ponta Verde produces and airs the following programs:

- Plantão Alagoas: news, with Fábio Araújo;
- Iapois: comedy, with Dani Ceará;
- Alô Alagoas: news, with Luiz Uchôa;
- Agenda: magazine program, with Estela Nascimento
- Ponto & Contra Ponto: interview program, with Estela Nascimento;
- É verão: variety program, with Itthallyne Marques and Dani Ceará.

Several other programs made up its line-up and were discontinued:

- A Vez do Povo na TV
- "Hashtag"
- Alagoas na Hora
- Alagoas na TV
- Alagoas Verdade
- Arena
- Boletim de Ocorrência
- Buba News
- Cadeia
- Canal Livre
- Circuito Alagoas
- Cotidiano
- Dois Toques
- Fashion.com
- Jornal da Praia na TV
- Jornal do Dia
- Jornal do Estado
- Manchete Esportiva Alagoas
- Mão e Contra
- Panorama Alagoas
- Pell Marques Show
- Plantão de Polícia
- Plantão Solitário
- Ponta Verde Esportes
- Ponta Verde Notícias
- Programa do Sikêra
- Satelitur
- Super Esporte
- Tá na Hora Alagoas
- Tribuna Livre
- Tudo de Bom
- Vida Show na TV
- Voz na Comunidade

== Relayers ==
List of relayers

City	Analog	Digital	City	Analog	Digital	City	Analog	Digital
Arapiraca	21	05 (32)	Atalaia	11	-	Batalha	10	-
Belém	10	-	Boca da Mata	09	-	Branquinha	10	-
Cajueiro	10	-	Capela	10	-	Coruripe	09	-
Delmiro Gouveia	13	-	Girau do Ponciano	21	-	Ibateguara	02	-
Igaci	-	30 (32)	Igreja Nova	-	42	Japaratinga	02	-
Junqueiro	04	-	Major Isidoro	09	-	Maragogi	25	-
Maribondo	10	-	Matriz de Camaragibe	02	-	Murici	02	-
Novo Lino	13	-	Palmeira dos Índios	10	19	Pão de Açúcar	09	-
Passo de Camaragibe	02	-	Paulo Jacinto	13	-	Penedo	13	-
Piaçabuçu	11	-	Piranhas	08	-	Quebrangulo	13	-
Rio Largo	12	-	Santana do Ipanema	09	-	Santana do Mundaú	10	-
São José da Laje	10	-	São Luís do Quitunde	13	-	São Sebastião	28	-
Tanque d'Arca	09	-	Teotônio Vilela	04	-	União dos Palmares	12	-
Viçosa	13	-

== Controversies ==
=== Judicial action from Sindjornal in 2009 ===
On September 2, 2009, judge José dos Santos Júnior, of the 4th Labor Court in Maceió, ruled that the action of the Journalists' Union (Sindjornal) was valid against TV Alagoas, which hired five camera operators who worked as cinematographic reporters, without the function of journalists, only hired as radio broadcasters, and also determined the salary payment (R$1,945.47), more than double what currently earn. TVs Pajuçara and Gazeta have already been condemned for similar cases in recent years.

=== Criticism of the station ===
In November 2009, the State Communication Conference released a statement of repudiation to TV Alagoas, claiming that "instead of contributing to the democratization of communication, it is serving as a means of exorcizing human beings during unloading sessions, which air almost 24 hours a day". The commission further argues "that media outlets are public concessions and should be used by all people".
