= TV Gazeta de Alagoas =

TV Gazeta de Alagoas (ZYA 221)
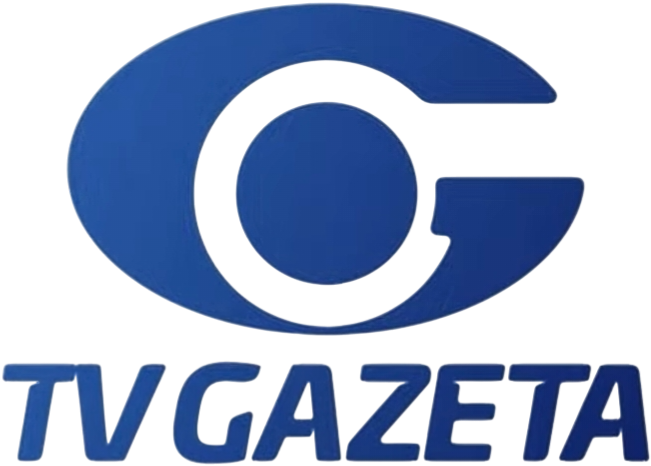
- Maceió, Alagoas; Brazil
- Channels: Digital: 31 (UHF); Virtual: 7
- Branding: TV Gazeta

Programming
- Affiliations: Independent

Ownership
- Owner: Organização Arnon de Mello; (TV Gazeta de Alagoas Ltda.)
- Sister stations: Gazeta News; Gazeta FM; Mix FM Maceió

History
- First air date: September 27, 1975
- Former channel numbers: Analog: 7 (VHF, 1975–2018)
- Former affiliations: TV Globo (1975-2025)

Technical information
- Licensing authority: ANATEL
- ERP: 5 kW
- Transmitter coordinates: 9°39′42.18″S 35°43′54.84″W

Links
- Public license information: Profile
- Website: gazetaweb.com

TV Gazeta de Alagoas (channel 7), also known as TV Gazeta, is a Brazilian independent television station based in Maceió, the capital of the state of Alagoas. The station is owned by the Organização Arnon de Mello (OAM), a media group linked to former Brazilian president Fernando Collor de Mello, which also controls the city's pay TV channel Gazeta News, the newspaper Gazeta de Alagoas and the radio stations Gazeta FM and Mix FM Maceió. It used to be a TV Globo affiliate from its inception until September 27, 2025, following a judicial decision from the network favoring TV Asa Branca Alagoas.

== History ==
=== Early years ===
The concession of the first television station in Maceió and Alagoas was granted by President Ernesto Geisel on May 16, 1974, to the journalist and politician Arnon de Mello, owner of the Gazeta de Alagoas newspaper and Rádio Gazeta. Signal tests on VHF channel 7 began in August 1975, with the transmission of Rede Globo's national programming in color and local programming in black and white. On September 3, the cornerstone of the station's headquarters building was laid, located in the Farol neighborhood, in Maceió, in the presence of the governor of Alagoas, Afrânio Salgado Lages and its CEO, Pedro Collor de Mello.

The inauguration, initially scheduled for October 1, took place a few days earlier on the afternoon of September 27, in which a plaque was fixed with the following text written by Arnon de Mello: "We are untying the knot that tied Alagoas to the humiliating [state] as the only state without a television station. Channel 7, which we inaugurated today, is proof of our willingness to serve you, the people of Alagoas, TV Gazeta de Alagoas." Before the launch of the station, the state received retransmissions from TV Rádio Clube and TV Jornal do Commercio, both from Pernambuco.

Gazeta was the first station in the Northeast of the country to relay Globo directly from the national signal — the affiliates installed then in the region received reception from TV Globo Nordeste, from Recife. Due to the costs of simultaneously showing network programming, the station obtained Quadruplex tapes with Globo programs from the Pernambuco branch, which, after broadcast, arrived within a month, restricting live transmission to Jornal Nacional and Fantástico. The broadcaster already had some small shareholders, including João Tenório (later the owner of TV Pajuçara), Carlos Lira Neto and Ricardo Brennand.

In December 2014, Gazeta signed an agreement with the Alagoan Football Federation to exclusively broadcast the Campeonato Alagoano from the 2015 edition onwards. The tournament was shown on the station until 2019, as the following year the rights were passed on to its sister company, TV Mar, which only covered that season.

=== Crisis and end of TV Globo affiliation ===
On June 25, 2019, the Union of Professional Journalists of the State of Alagoas went on strike in the state's broadcasters, including Gazeta, against a proposal to reduce the category's salary by 40%, authored by the channels of the Arnon de Mello and supported by TV Pajuçara and TV Ponta Verde. The movement ended on July 3, after the Regional Labor Court of the 19th Region decided to maintain the salary with a 3% increase in value. The following day, Gazeta fired journalists who joined the strike, being the target of an action by the Public Ministry of Labor of Alagoas on the 9th, which ordered the reinstatement of the professionals under penalty of a daily fine of 50 thousand reais.

On July 10, 2019, the Federal Public Ministry and the Federal Court decided to revoke and not renew the concessions of TV Gazeta de Alagoas and its sister stations, radio stations 98 FM and Gazeta FM, due to the broadcasters having in their corporate structure the then senator Fernando Collor de Mello, which is not permitted by law. However, the stations remain on the air until the process becomes final in all spheres.

On May 31, 2023, with the decision of the STF that sentenced Fernando Collor to eight years and ten months in prison for passive corruption and money laundering, irregularities committed by the former senator using TV Gazeta de Alagoas came to light. The station's accounts were used to receive bribes, paid in return for contracts signed by UTC Engenharia with BR Distribuidora. The conviction also revealed that the judicial recovery of TV Gazeta and the Arnon de Mello Organization was caused by simulated loans to Collor, made with the aim of justifying the amounts received.

On October 4, 2023, TV Globo announced to the management of TV Gazeta de Alagoas the decision not to renew its affiliation, alleging the decision of the STF that had condemned the broadcaster for the Alagoas station being used in corruption schemes. On October 26, 2023, the F5 website, linked to the newspaper Folha de S. Paulo, reported that TV Globo decided to end its affiliation with TV Gazeta after 48 years, being replaced in the first half of 2024 by a new station, owned of Grupo Nordeste de Comunicação (which also controls the affiliate TV Asa Branca in Caruaru, Pernambuco). The station had been undergoing tests since February under the name "TV Elo", when rumors were already emerging about a possible affiliation with Globo.

On November 8, 2023, TV Gazeta filed a lawsuit (similar to the action used by TV Tribuna, from Vitória, Espírito Santo) requesting the mandatory renewal of the affiliation contract with the Rio broadcaster, which expires on December 31. The reason used by the local station is the request for judicial recovery, opened in 2019. The opening of the process was seen as "cowardly" by TV Globo in response to the process on the 17th. On the 29th, the Public Ministry of Alagoas accepted a favorable injunction for the channel from Alagoas and decided to make it mandatory to renew Globo's affiliation with Gazeta for at least three years. Such a decision is not definitive, as it depends on the courts to provide a definitive opinion. On December 1, differences arose between TV Gazeta and Globo regarding the renewal of the affiliation contract, mediated by the Public Ministry of Alagoas (MP-AL). TV Gazeta claimed that the contract had not been renewed after 48 years, citing ethical issues. MP-AL proposed a three-year extension of the contract, but TV Gazeta sought an injunction to ensure continuity until 2028. On December 2, allegations emerged about the possible omission of Braskem's name in TV Gazeta's reports, in addition to criticism about the broadcaster's discreet approach to the issue. During Globo's attempt to produce a story for Jornal Nacional about the sinking of the soil in Maceió, they faced communication difficulties with TV Gazeta. Subsequently, after intervention by the Journalism department, TV Gazeta provided the article to Jornal Nacional. On December 5, TV Gazeta had a favorable decision in a legal action. The decision was for Grupo Globo to renew the contract with the broadcaster for another five years. The Alagoas court argued that failure to immediately renew the contract could result in more than 200 layoffs at the Arnon de Mello Group, causing a significant impact on the local economy.

At the turn of the year 2024, TV Globo was unsuccessful in overturning the Alagoas court injunction through the Rio de Janeiro Court of Justice due to the judicial recess due to the end-of-year holiday period. The contract with TV Gazeta ended on December 31, 2023, but by court order, the Alagoas channel remained affiliated with the Rio broadcaster. The imbroglio caused "TV Elo" to go on air, temporarily retransmitting Canal Futura. Globo chose to give up the signal of its educational channel to avoid having two stations broadcasting TV Globo until the issue is resolved in court, fearing a deterioration of its image.

On January 3, 2024, Globo obtained a victory in the Alagoas Court, overturning the injunction that forced renewal until 2028. In the decision, judge Paulo Zacarias stated that "no company can be forced to do business with another that it does not want". As a result, the retransmission of the programming on TV Gazeta de Alagoas was only guaranteed until the full judgment of the merits in the Plenary of the 3rd Chamber of the Court of Justice of Alagoas, which should take place from January 22.

On February 6, 2024, the newspaper Folha de S.Paulo, in an access to the report sent by TV Globo to the Alagoas court, disclosed that the Rio channel accused TV Gazeta of moral harassment against its own employees, citing some condemnations of the local station in lawsuits filed by former employees, in addition to overbilling of salaries, with one of the high-ranking executives receiving R$67,000, exceeding the amounts paid by the Brazilian market and the financial situation of the Arnon de Mello Organization, alleged in the lawsuit filed with the MP- AL by Gazeta to maintain Globo's affiliation until 2028. Furthermore, the convictions by the STF were highlighted in the document.

Despite having accepted the decision presented by TV Gazeta in November 2023, the MP-AL decided to reverse the action in favor of TV Globo on March 16, 2024, leaving only one vote to end the affiliation, which depends solely on the 3 ° Court of Justice of Alagoas, whose trial was scheduled for April 10, but was postponed twice due to problems among the judges.

In the end, on August 19, 2025, the STJ decided to renew the contract with the Rio de Janeiro broadcaster for a period of three years, without any possibility of appeal, ending the dispute that began in 2023. Globo, however, ended up taking the case to the STF on the 24th, reopening the legal battle and gaining the involvement of the Attorney General of the Union (AGU), the Ministério das Comunicações and the Procuradoria Geral da República (PGR), which began to question the constitutionality of the decisions favorable to Gazeta and the operation of the channel. On September 26, STF Minister Luís Roberto Barroso accepted the manifesto of TV Globo and the PGR and overturned all the rulings in favor of TV Gazeta by the STJ and the Alagoas Court of Justice, authorizing the Rio de Janeiro broadcaster to affiliate with TV Asa Branca.

At midnight on September 27, TV Gazeta would definitively cease to be affiliated with TV Globo, but it ignored the STF's decision and continued to broadcast the Rio de Janeiro station's normal programming, while at around 12:09 a.m., TV Asa Branca Alagoas officially went on the air. As a result, both began broadcasting Globo at the same time. Gazeta claimed that it was not notified of Barroso's initial decision, which is only expected to happen on September 28. Globo, however, considers the broadcast of programming on channel 7 to be “pirated” and is therefore considering legal action with compensation payments for non-compliance. However, with the end of the reruns of Terra Nostra, Gazeta stopped broadcasting Globo's programming altogether, replacing the Rio de Janeiro-based broadcaster's programming with institutional loops, reruns of the program Isto é Alagoas, and news programs that were also reran several times during the day. Before the loop, Gazeta still aired some episodes of Escolinha do Professor Raimundo, but aired locally. On the same day, ALTV 2ª Edição began airing for one hour.

=== Independent station (2025-present) ===
On September 28th, 2025, at the time when Fantástico was previously broadcast, TV Gazeta aired GazetaNews' Sessão de Cinema, with a pirated airing of the film Bird Box, a film that is exclusive to the Netflix streaming service. On September 29th, the station continued to use TV Globo's standard graphics and soundtrack for local newscasts, challenging the Rio de Janeiro network's copyright. On the same day, Bom Dia Alagoas was extended until 9am and gained a second edition at 10am, followed by ALTV 1ª Edição, which began at 11am. In the ALTV 1ª Edição segment, the graphics were changed to the name of the station, and Globo Esporte Alagoas was replaced by a new version of Gazeta Esporte. In the evening edition of ALTV 2ª Edição on the same day, the news intro did not appear, and the 50th anniversary ident was inserted in its place.

The station also became the target of a lawsuit filed on September 4, 2025, by the Ministério das Comunicações, requesting the removal of Fernando Collor and Luís Pereira Amorim from the list of partners, with a deadline of ninety days for the action to be carried out, counted from the date the case was opened. In case of non-compliance, the channel would have its concessions revoked. The Public Prosecutor's Office of Alagoas issued a favorable opinion for Collor's removal on the 28th. After three days as an independent station, on September 30th, 2025, rumors began to circulate that the station was hastily negotiating an agreement with Rede Bandeirantes, since Band operates in the region through a Band RN relay, but the information had not been officially confirmed. On October 6th, the F5 portal confirmed the information that negotiations were underway with the São Paulo network, given the unlikelihood of Barroso's decision being reversed in the Supreme Court.

On October 1st, 2025, the Alagoas Court granted an injunction in favor of removing Fernando Collor from the shareholding structure of the Organização Arnon de Mello companies, accepting a request made by the former president himself to avoid the loss of the concession for channel 21 UHF in Maceió by TV Gazeta de Alagoas and also the concessions for the group's radio stations. As a result, the station's ownership structure became undefined, since Collor was the only shareholder registered with the Alagoas Board of Trade who was still alive. His siblings, Leda and Leopoldo, sold their shares to the former president while he was still alive, and Pedro Collor's heirs relinquished their shares shortly after his death in 1994. However, the broadcaster did not update the corporate structure with the Commercial Registry in either case.

== Future affiliate ==
On September 30th, 2025, the Jornal Extra de Alagoas newspaper reported that there were rumors that the station was hastily negotiating an agreement with Rede Bandeirantes, since Band only has a presence in Alagoas through a Band RN relay, but the information had not been officially confirmed. On October 6, the F5 portal confirmed the information that negotiations were underway with the São Paulo network, given the unlikelihood of Barroso's decision being reversed in the STF.

On October 10th, some media outlets in Alagoas announced that Gazeta had already reached an agreement with Band to broadcast the network, but that everything would depend on the Supreme Court's decision after the Alagoas broadcaster filed a final appeal to return to Globo. The information was confirmed the following day (11), and the change was scheduled to take place on November 1, when the channel decided to give up on filing further appeals to regain its affiliation with the Rio de Janeiro network. While the transition was not taking place, the broadcaster expanded its independent programming by introducing new programs from GazetaNews. The affiliation represents the return of a Band partner broadcaster in the state, which had already rebroadcast its programming through TV Alagoas (now TV Ponta Verde) between 1999 and 2007.

However, the affiliation with Band did not happen on the expected date, and the station began to await the ruling on an appeal in the Supreme Court requesting the return of its status as an affiliate of TV Globo, alleging the possibility of bankruptcy. However, on December 19th, Band posted a statement on its Instagram account that it had withdrawn from its affiliation with the Alagoas station.

== Current programming ==
In addition to rebroadcasting the programming of the GazetaNews cable channel, TV Gazeta de Alagoas produces and airs the following programs:

- Bom Dia Alagoas: early-morning news program, with Gilvan Nunes and Sofia Sepreny;
- Boletim Gazeta: news program, with Thaíse Cavalcante e Marcos Rodrigues;
- Bom Dia Alagoas 2ª Edição (2nd Edition): early-morning news program, with Heliana Gonçalves e Michelle Farias;
- ALTV 1ª Edição: news program, with Chrystiane Gonçalves;
- Gazeta Esporte: sports news program, with Guilherme Nobre;
- Pelo Mundo: travel program, with Luca Bassani
- Sessão de Cinema: movie block
- ALTV 2ª Edição: evening news program, with Filipe Toledo;
- Meio Ambiente em Pauta: news program about the environment, with Amorim Neto;
- Isso É Alagoas: variety program, with Gilka Mafra;
- Sabadão: variety program, with Mara Almeida e Ragi Torres;
- Gazeta Rural: news program about agribusiness, with Nick Marone;
- Edição das Cinco: afternoon news program, with Rafael Alves;
- Edição das Nove: news program, with Marcos Rodrigues and Wyderlan Araújo

Since becoming an independent station, it started airing Sessão de Cinema, which consists of pirated movies, whose rights are reserved mostly to streaming services. On October 1, 2025, Netflix initiated a lawsuit against the station for its unauthorized airing of Bird Box days earlier. The airing of movies without authorization has also surprised the station's staff.

Several other programs were part of the station's lineup and have been discontinued:

- AL Esporte
- ALTV 1ª Edição (Praça TV)
- ALTV 2ª Edição (Praça TV)
- Boa Tarde Alagoas
- Esporte no 7
- G1 em 1 Minuto Alagoas: News bulletin
- Globo Esporte Alagoas
- Jornal Hoje - local edition
- Jornal Nacional - local edition
- Jornalismo Eletrônico
- O Mundo Maravilhoso da Criança
- Sábado Maior
- Terra e Mar

== Technical information ==
Virtual channel	Digital channel	Screen	Content
7.1	21 UHF	1080i	TV Gazeta programming

The station began testing its digital signal in June 2010, during Globo's broadcasts of the 2010 FIFA World Cup, through UHF channel 21. On November 29 of the same year, the station officially began its digital transmissions. On March 26, 2012, the station's newscasts and programs began to be produced in high definition.

Based on the federal decree transitioning Brazilian TV stations from analog to digital signals, TV Gazeta, as well as the other stations in Maceió, ceased broadcasting on VHF channel 7 on May 30, 2018, following the official ANATEL roadmap.
