= Arapiraca =

Municipality of Alagoas, Brazil

- Municipality
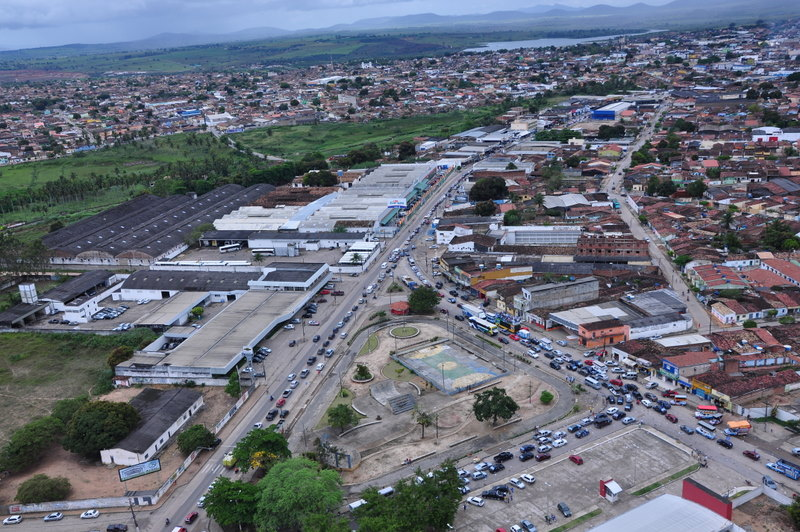

- Flag Coat of arms

- Location of Arapiraca in the State of Alagoas

- Location in Brazil
- Coordinates: 9°45′07″S 36°39′39″W
- Country: Brazil
- State: Alagoas
- Mesoregion: Agreste Alagoano
- Microregion: Arapiraca
- Founded: October 30, 1924

Government
  - Mayor: Luciano Barbosa(MDB)

Area
  - Total: 351.475 km^{2} (135.705 sq mi)
- Elevation: 264 m (866 ft)

Population (2022 Brazilian census)
  - Total: 234,696
  - Estimate (2025): 243,906
  - Density: 67,899/km^{2} (175,860/sq mi)
- Demonym: Arapiraquense
- Time zone: UTC−3 (BRT)
- Postal code: 57300
- Area code: (+55) 82
- Website: Official website (in Portuguese)

Arapiraca (Central Northeastern Portuguese pronunciation: [ɐɾɐpiˈɾakɐ]) is a Brazilian municipality in the state of Alagoas, Northeast Region of the country. It is located in Agreste in Alagoas and belongs to the Metropolitan Region of Agreste, being located about 125 km (78 mi) west of state capital. Its population in 2022 was 234,696 inhabitants, making it the second most populous municipality in Alagoas and the ninth in the interior of the Northeast. It occupies an area of just over 345 km^{2} (133 sq mi), being 59 km^{2} (23 sq mi) in urban area.

The development of the city took place mainly in the 1970s, when the culture of producing tobacco, formerly known "Green Gold", one of the main economic activities of the time in the region, elevated the city to the category of municipality. Currently, the city has several large companies and countless small companies that give a great boost to the local economy.

Currently, Arapiraquense City has been standing out for being one of the most generating jobs throughout the national territory. According to data from the General Register of Employees and Unemployed, released by the Ministry of Labor and Employment, Arapiraca was the fourth largest generator of formal jobs in the country in 2015. According to the MTE, the city generated 2,076 jobs last year, second only to the cities of Canaã dos Carajás, in Pará, which generated 2,801 formal jobs, Pontal do Paraná, in Paraná, which registered 2,265 job openings and Matão, in the state of São Paulo, with the creation of 2,110 formal jobs.

== Etymology ==
According to a popular belief, the word Arapiraca has indigenous origins and means the "branch that the macaw visits". However, according to Tupinologist Eduardo de Almeida Navarro, the word "Arapiraca" originated from the term Tupi language arupare'aka, which means "barbs".

== History ==
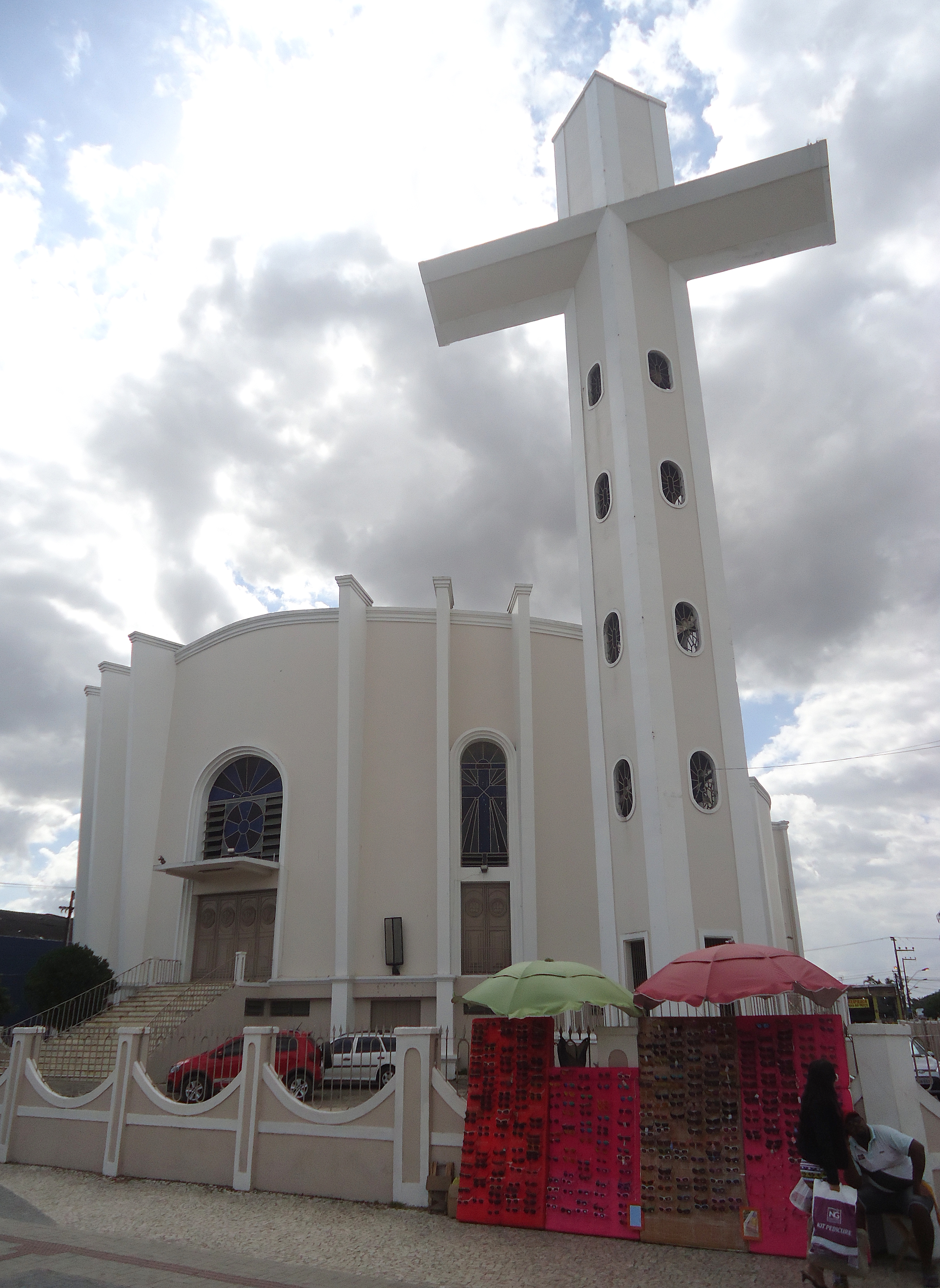
Our Lady of Good Counsel Church

Although the city of Arapiraca appears to be a recent city, there are records that, around 1848, the Arapiraca lands belonged to Marinho Falcão. He sold them to Amaro da Silva Valente, who moved in with his family. Some time later, Amaro da Silva's son-in-law, Manoel André Correia, began to penetrate the long, untouched virgin forests until he discovered a fertile plain rich in leafy trees, mainly the tree that gives its name to the city, "Arapiraca". It was below Arapiraca, located on the banks of Riacho Seco, where Manoel André Correia rested and had the idea of building a hut.

After some time, with the arrival of other families, the Arapiraca tree was surrounded by a village. The place began to be populated in the first half of the nineteenth century. In 1855, Manoel André's wife died, and in her honor, in 1864, Manoel André decided to build the chapel of Nossa Senhora do Bom Conselho over her grave. In 1863, a year before the construction of the chapel, the son of Amaro da Silva Valente and brother-in-law of Manoel André, Manoel Ferreira de Macedo, arrived in the village. Agricultural products produced in the village were sold at the Lagoa dos Veados fair, close to the village of Arapiraca.

Manoel André also contributed to the economic growth of neighboring towns. Manoel opened a trail along which it was possible to take animal convoys to the village of Porto da Folha (today the city of Traipu), as it was known until 1876. This trail became known in the central region of Alagoas and all the products from neighboring towns were shipped through it. In the year 1880, Esperidião Rodrigues, associating with Florêncio Apolinário, settled in the village of Arapiraca with the first business house, in the field of stevedores and fabrics and in 1884 Esperidião created the first fair.

=== Political Emancipation ===
As a district, Arapiraca was successively subordinated to Penedo, Porto Real do Colégio, São Brás and Limoeiro de Anadia. It was elevated to the category of municipality on October 30, 1924, consisting of territories dismembered from Palmeira dos Índios, Porto Real, São Brás, Traipu and Limoeiro de Anadia.

From the decade of 1970, due to the large area planted with tobacco, which generated an excess of the product in the small tobacco processing industries in the region, and the consequent decrease in price, a cycle followed of decline in tobacco farming. Since the 1980s, it has experienced economic growth with its trade (with emphasis on the traditional street market) and services. In addition, the industrial sector of the municipality has shown relative growth in recent years.

== Geography ==
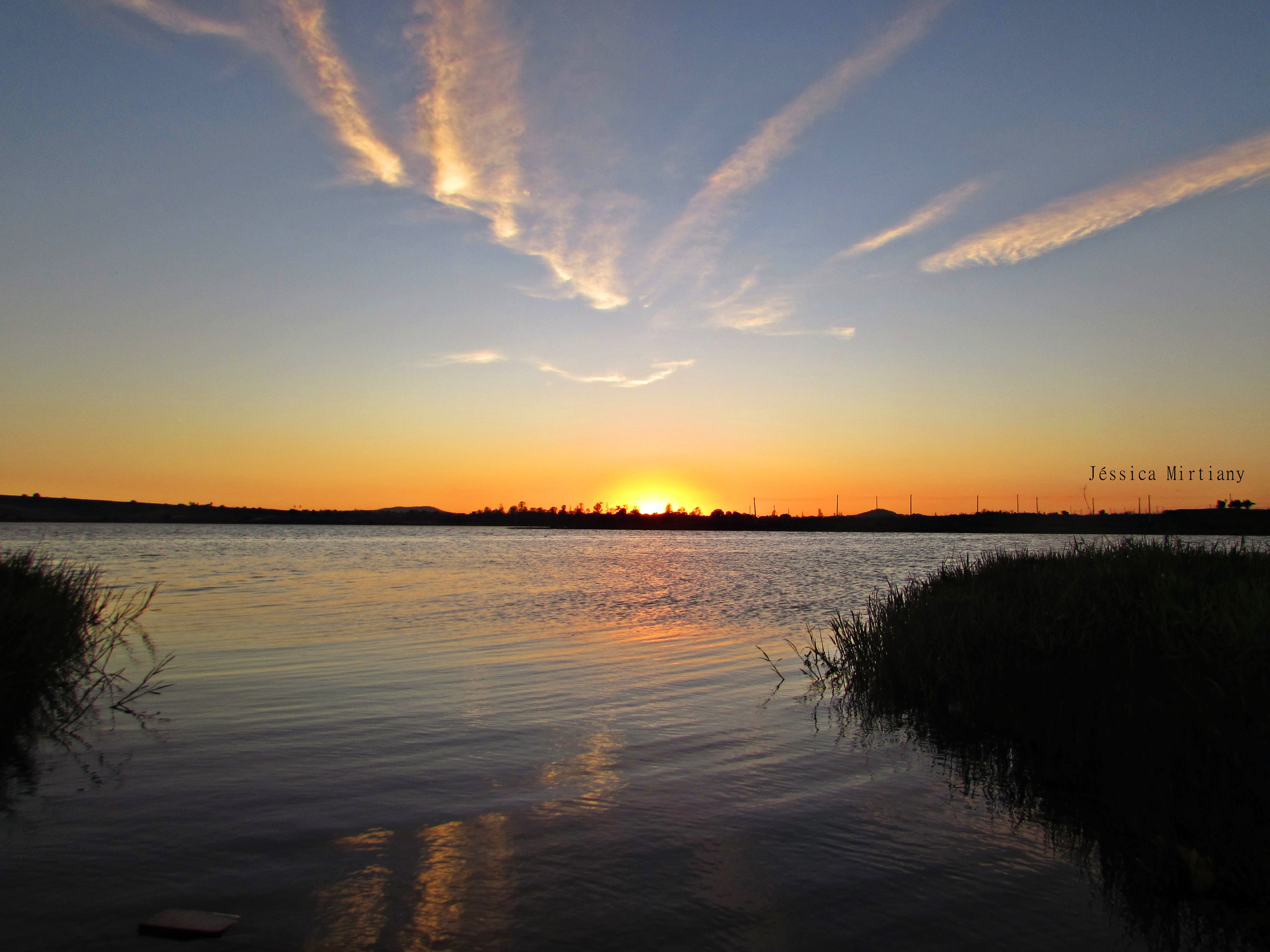
Sunset at Lago da Perucaba

Its area is 351 square kilometers, located on a wide plain, at an altitude of 265 meters, 123 kilometers from Maceió and 44 kilometers from Palmeira dos Índios. The climate is considered one of the healthiest in the state.

The most important municipality in the interior of Alagoas, Arapiraca stands out as an important commercial center in the rural region, located in the geographic center of the state of Alagoas. The area of direct influence of the municipality reaches a population of approximately half a million inhabitants.

It limits to the north with the municipality of Igaci, to the south with the municipality of São Sebastião, to the east with the municipalities of Coité do Noia and Limoeiro de Anadia, to the west with the municipalities of Lagoa da Canoa and Girau do Ponciano and Feira Grande, to the northwest with the municipality of Craíbas and to the southeast with the municipality of Junqueiro.

=== Weather ===
The climate of Arapiraca is characterized as tropical climate hot semi-humid, or sub-humid (Bsh type according to Köppen climate classification), with temperature annual mean of 24.8 °C (76.6 °F) and an average rainfall of about 611 millimetres per year (0.762 in/Ms), concentrated between the months of April and July. The precipitation falls mainly in the form of rain and can also be accompanied by electrical discharges and strong gusts of wind. According to the Atmospheric Electricity Group of National Institute for Space Research (ELAT/INPE) in 2018, the municipality has a lightning density of 0.24 lightning strikes per km^{2}/year.

According to data from the National Institute of Meteorology (INMET) collected at the automatic meteorological station of the city, installed on April 26, 2008, the lowest temperature recorded was 15.1 °C (59.2 °F) on July 17, 2017, and the highest reached 39.8 °C (103.6 °F) on November 26, 2015. The highest accumulated precipitation in 24 hours, in turn, was 100.3 millimetres (3.95 in) on June 10, 2009.

== Neighboring municipalities ==
Clockwise from the north:

- north: Igaci
- north-north-east: Craíbas
- north-east: Coité do Nóia
- east: Limoeiro de Anadia
- south-east: Junqueiro
- south-south-east: São Sebastião
- south: Feira Grande
- south-west: Lagoa da Canoa

== Policy and administration ==
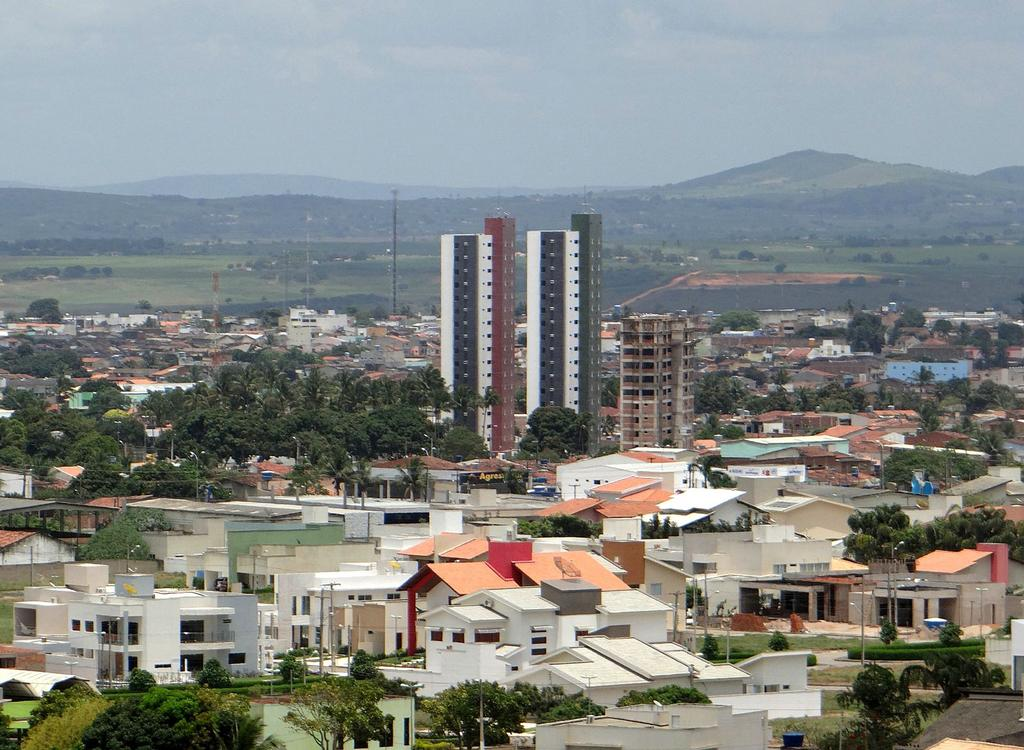
Partial city view

The municipal administration is carried out by the powers Executive and Legislative. The first representative of the Executive branch and mayor of the municipality was Esperidião Rodrigues, elected in the first elections held after political emancipation.

The Legislative branch, in turn, is constituted by the Municipal Chamber, composed of 19 Councilmen elected for four-year terms (in compliance with the provisions of Article 29 of the Constitution). It is up to the house to prepare and vote on fundamental laws for the administration and the Executive, especially the participatory budget (Budget Guidelines Law).

== Economy ==
The Gross Domestic Product (GDP) of Arapiraca is the highest in its micro-region, followed by the GDP of Marechal Deodoro, São Miguel dos Campos and Coruripe. In the IBGE data for 2012, the municipality had R$2 billion and 416 million reais in its Gross Domestic Product.

== Urban structure ==
=== Access ===
Access to the city is via Airporto de Arapiraca and through the Deputado Nezinho Bus Station.

=== Education ===
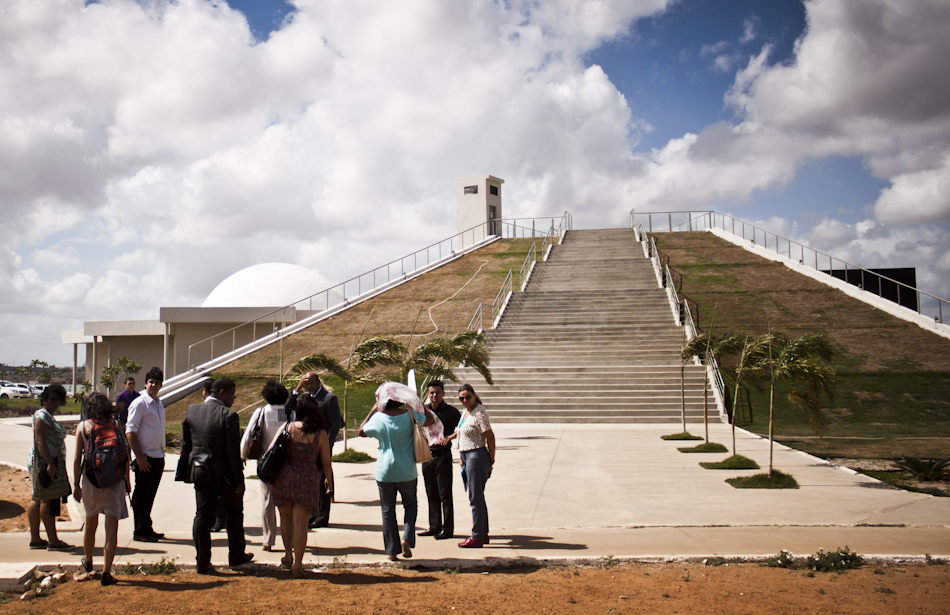
Exterior view of the Planetarium

The city of Arapiraca, in 2012, for both public and private schools, had approximately 5,544 enrollments, 322 teachers and 98 schools for pre-school education; 36,387 enrollments, 1,602 teachers and 108 schools for fundamental education and 10,877 enrollments, 461 teachers and 26 schools for High School.

The municipality also has 2 public universities, UFAL and UNEAL, and 1 federal institute, IFAL, in addition to several private institutions of higher education, such as Cesmac University Center, UniSEB, Arcanjo Mikael Higher Education Center, Integrated Colleges of Patos etc. In addition, Arapiraca has what is considered one of the best and most modern digital planetariums in Brazil with an auditorium with a capacity for 235 people being inaugurated on October 2, 2012 The municipality also has a wide network of digital libraries built in several squares in Arapiraca called "Arapiraquinhas", with its first unit inaugurated in August 2010, in the Jardim Esperança neighborhood.

Arapiraca education in numbers
| Level | Enrollment | Teachers | Schools (total) |
|---|---|---|---|
| Preschool Education | 5,544 | 322 | 98 |
| Elementary School | 36,387 | 1,602 | 108 |
| High School | 10,877 | 461 | 26 |

== Sports ==
Arapiraca has two football teams: the ASA, founded on September 25, 1952, and Cruzeiro de Arapiraca, founded on May 28, 2019. The two teams play their games at Estádio Municipal Coaracy da Mata Fonseca, popularly known as Fumeirão, which opened in 1953 and has a capacity of 15,000. A match with record attendance was held on July 12, 1981.
