= TV Asa Branca =

TV Asa Branca (ZYB 305)
- Caruaru, Pernambuco; Brazil
- Channels: Digital: 17 (UHF); Virtual: 8

Programming
- Affiliations: TV Globo

Ownership
- Owner: Grupo Asa Branca; (Rede Nordeste de Comunicação Ltda.)
- Sister stations: TV Asa Branca Alagoas

History
- Founded: 1989
- First air date: August 1, 1991
- Former channel numbers: Analog: 8 (VHF, 1991–2017)

Technical information
- Licensing authority: ANATEL
- ERP: 2 kW
- HAAT: 112 m (367 ft)
- Transmitter coordinates: 8°17′5.6″S 35°58′38.1″W

Links
- Public license information: Profile
- Website: redeglobo.globo.com/pe/tvasabranca

TV Asa Branca is a Brazilian television station based in Caruaru, a city in the state of Pernambuco. It operates on channel 8 (17 UHF digital) and is affiliated with TV Globo. It is owned by Grupo Asa Branca, who also has politician Inocêncio de Oliveira as a shareholder. Its studios are located in the Pinheirópolis neighborhood, and its transmission antenna is at the top of Morro Bom Jesus.

== History ==
In 1989, Pernambuco politician Inocêncio de Oliveira received the grant for the implementation of Caruaru's second television channel, which until then only had TV Pernambuco. Along with this, journalist Vicente Jorge Espíndola and engineer Luiz de França Leite began the project to implement the station, establishing the company together with Inocêncio de Oliveira.

On August 1, 1991, TV Asa Branca was officially founded, broadcasting through VHF channel 8, and being the first affiliate of Rede Globo in Pernambuco, also retransmitting part of the programming of TV Globo Nordeste do Recife and carrying its signal for 108 inland municipalities, together with TV Grande Rio in Petrolina, opened on the same day. Its headquarters were initially located at the top of Morro Bom Jesus (where the 4th Military Police Battalion of Caruaru is currently located), and its commercial department in the Divinópolis neighborhood.

In 1993, the station opened its first branch in Garanhuns. In 1997, the station left its headquarters in Morro Bom Jesus and moved to the Indianópolis neighborhood. In 2000, its studios and commercial department were brought together in the Pinheirópolis neighborhood, where it remains today. That same year, the station began producing local segments of NETV, which until then had been entirely retransmitted from Recife. In November 2006, the station opened another branch in Serra Talhada.

On January 5, 2024, Grupo Asa Branca was mentioned in a report by Folha de S.Paulo's F5 about the creation of a new Globo affiliate in Alagoas to replace TV Gazeta de Alagoas.

On September 26, 2025, the president of the Federal Supreme Court, Luís Roberto Barroso, granted a request from TV Globo to revoke the decision that required the Rio de Janeiro network to renew its contract with TV Gazeta de Alagoas. As a result, as of midnight on September 27, channel 28.1 was renamed TV Asa Branca Alagoas, aired a statement announcing the new affiliation, and began rebroadcasting Globo's programming. The former affiliate, however, did not leave the network, and as a result, both began rebroadcasting programming at the same time.

Starting today, TV Asa Branca is writing one of the most important chapters in the history of Brazilian television.

TV Asa Branca is now Rede Globo's affiliate in Alagoas, consolidating the expansion of the Grupo Asa Brance, which, for thirty-four years, has worked tirelessly for unbiased, ethical, and pluralistic journalism. The new broadcaster will continue firmly on this path.

To our dear friends in Alagoas, in addition to a special greeting, we are committed to bringing you the most relevant news of the day, prioritizing topics of public interest in any of the 102 municipalities of Alagoas.

We extend our hand to the advertising market and recognize the talent of the professionals who create the present here and help develop the future of Alagoas.

Welcome to TV Asa Branca Alagoas, Globo's new affiliate in the state.

Alagoas is now on the air.

— TV Asa Branca Alagoas in the informational slide shown around midnight on the 27th.

As it was not prepared to produce and broadcast local programs at the time of the court decision, TV Asa Branca Alagoas began rebroadcasting local newscasts from TV Globo Pernambuco, which on Saturday featured the station's journalism director, Mauro Wedekin, to announce the new affiliation. The selection of professionals to join the station's team will take place starting on the 29th. The station's first newscast, “ABTV 2ª Edição,” temporarily presented by Mauro, is scheduled to premiere on October 1.

== Digital signal ==
| Virtual channel | Digital channel | Screen | Content |
|---|---|---|---|
| 8.1 | 17 UHF | 1080i | TV Asa Branca/Globo's main schedule |

TV Asa Branca began its digital transmissions on an experimental basis on May 16, 2013, through channel 17 UHF. On August 1, the station's 22nd anniversary, the digital signal was officially launched.
