= TV Norte Paraíba =

TV Norte Paraíba (ZYB 272)
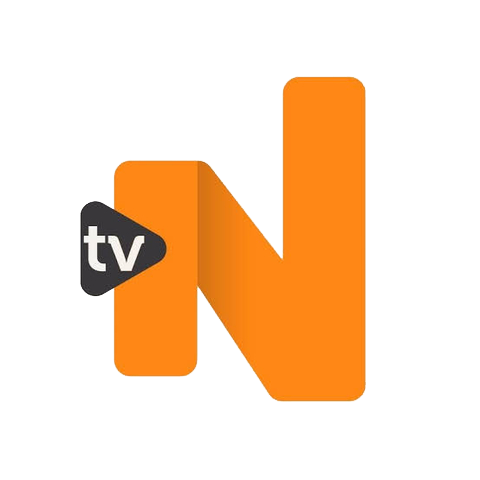
- João Pessoa, Paraíba; Brazil
- Channels: Digital: 16 (UHF); Virtual: 10

Programming
- Affiliations: RedeTV!

Ownership
- Owner: Grupo Norte de Comunicação; (Sociedade de Televisão Manauara Ltda. Rádio e Televisão O Norte Ltda.)

History
- First air date: January 1, 1987
- Former names: TV O Norte (1987-2009); TV Clube (2009-2016); TV Manaíra (2016-2025)
- Former channel numbers: Analog: 10 (VHF, 1987-2018)
- Former affiliations: Rede Manchete (1987; 1997-1998); SBT (1987-1995); Rede Record (1995-1997); Rede Bandeirantes (1998-2023)

Technical information
- Licensing authority: ANATEL
- ERP: 10 kW
- Transmitter coordinates: 7°7′26.4″S 34°52′33.1″W

Links
- Public license information: Profile
- Website: portalnorte.com.br

TV Norte Paraíba (channel 10, formerly TV Manaíra) is a Brazilian television station headquartered in João Pessoa, the capital of the state of Paraíba. The station is a RedeTV! affiliate owned by Grupo Norte de Comunicação, part of the TV Norte network, and also owns the local Norte FM radio station.

== History ==
=== TV O Norte (1987-2009) ===
The station started as TV O Norte, second television station in João Pessoa (after TV Cabo Branco) and the third in Paraíba (after TV Borborema, signing on at midnight on January 1, 1987, on VHF channel 10, where a relay of TV Globo Nordeste used to operate. At the beginning, it was a Rede Manchete affiliate, which already had a relay station on channel 13. In March that year, the station opted to join SBT. The station was founded by Marconi Góes de Albuquerque and had as its first director-superintendent journalist Abelardo Jurema Filho. Over time, local programming began.

Its first presenters were Anchieta Filho (Jornal O Norte 1.ª edição, shown at 6:45am) and Gilson Souto Maior and Beth Menezes (Jornal O Norte 2.ª edição, at 6:45pm). In the early 90s, the bulletins were presented by Silvio Carlos, until they were defunct. Throughout the schedule, there were newsflashes from O Norte Eletrônico. Its pioneer reporters were: Ana Márcia, Nelma Figueiredo, Jonas Batista, Gilson Renato, Welington Sérgio and Selma Vidal.

The first local programs were Paraíba Hoje (independent production from advertiser Weber Luna), a weekly newsmagazine previously broadcast by TV Jornal from Recife, Pernambuco (which was relayed locally on channel 7, being replaced by TV Cabo Branco), Status (with Abelardo Jurema Filho), Agenda da Cidade (with Gilson Renato), Tânia Maia e Você (female program), Telesporte (with Ivan Thomás and Marciano Soares), De Olho na Cidade (police and service program) e Super Jota Show (audience-based variety show) - these last programs presented by Jota Ferreira. It also pioneered the live broadcast of events such as Carnaval, Miss Paraíba and the Indepdendence Day parades, as well as the expansion of the signal to key cities in the state.

From July 1, 1995, to December 31, 1997, the station joined Rede Record, which up until then, had no affiliate at all in Paraíba. After losing its affiliation to TV Correio, it provisionally became an affiliate of Rede Manchete again, until, on February 18, 1998, it became an affiliate of Rede Bandeirantes. Local news only returned to the schedule in 2001, with O Norte.com, replaced in 2007 with Jornal O Norte, both of which shown from Monday to Friday, before Jornal da Band. In 2008, O Norte Agora emerged, a daily newsmagazine and interview program, on weekdats, at 12:30pm. Throughout its trajectory, it opened hand for dozens of independent productions.

=== TV Clube (2009-2016) ===
The station started adopting the name TV Clube on August 5, 2009. The day chosen was an homage to the 424th anniversary of the city of João Pessoa. With new studios, programs and presenters, the choice of the new name owed to the strong brand that Clube FM developed in Brasília, Recife and João Pessoa.

On January 16, 2015, the station sold 57,5% of its shares from Diários Associados to Sistema Opinião de Comunicação, owned by Cândido Pinheiro, and who already owned part of the shares of TV Ponta Negra and TV Alagoas. The sale was approved by the Administrative Council for Economic Defense on January 19, through a note published in Diário Oficial da União. In 2019, Sistema Opinião de Comunicação started controlling 100% of the shares.

=== TV Manaíra (2016-2025) ===
On February 10, 2016, it ended using the TV Clube nomenclature, which also affected some of its programs, such as Jornal da Clube and Aqui na Clube (respectively renamed Jornal do 10 and Nosso Programa). The station's newsroom began to be used on that day, to begin the renovation of the current studio and construction of new sets. With 8 days left until the premiere, calls began to air with a countdown, in addition to the participation of new presenters.

On March 14, 2016, a breakfast was held to present the new name and new brand to the advertising market, as well as new scenarios, programs and presenters. From then on, it was renamed TV Manaíra, the name most voted on by the public, through a poll on the broadcaster's website.

On October 24, 2023, it was announced that TV Manaíra was going to lose another affiliation in its history, this time to TV Arapuan (a RedeTV! affiliate since its founding), which had signed a contract with Rede Bandeirantes. The change happened after the network refused Sistema Opinião's offer for the channel. On December 13, after nearly two years of indecision, the group announced that TV Manaíra was going to affiliate with RedeTV!, exchanging affiliations with TV Arapuan. The change happened on December 28.

On July 11, 2024, the station announced the hiring of Paraíban journalist Heron Cid to present a new weekly interview program, named Hora H, whose premiere was set for July 28. The first edition of Hora H featured an interview with João Campos, mayor of Recife.

On January 21, 2025, the sale of the station and TV Borborema, of Campina Grande, was announced, to Grupo Norte de Comunicação, becoming the second time the station was sold to another group. The following day, in a joint note, the former and new owners confirmed that the acquisition and sale contract was signed on December 19, 2024, and that they were expecting CADE approval to transfer the control.

=== TV Norte Paraíba (since 2025) ===
On March 9, 2025, Grupo Norte de Comunicação took over the control of the two TV stations in Paraíba, and on March 12, changed the station's name for the third time, this time to TV Norte Paraíba. Sister station TV Borborema did not change its name by the Manaus-based conglomerate and kept its own identification since its founding, 59 years earlier.

== Technical information ==
Virtual	PSIP	Screen	Content
10.1	16 UHF	1080i	TV Norte Paraíba/RedeTV!'s main schedule

The station started its digital broadcasts on February 16, 2016, on UHF channel 16. On October 10, 2018, it started airing networked programming in high definition.

The station shut down its analog signal on VHF channel 10 on May 30, 2018, following the official ANATEL roadmap.
