= TV Asa Branca Alagoas =

TV Asa Branca Alagoas (ZYP 330)
- Maceió, Alagoas; Brazil
- Channels: Digital: 28 (UHF)
- Branding: TV Asa Branca

Programming
- Affiliations: 28.1: TV Globo; 28.2: Futura

Ownership
- Owner: Grupo Asa Branca; (Elo Comunicação Ltda.)

History
- First air date: June 21, 2024
- Former names: Canal Futura Alagoas (2024-2025)
- Former affiliations: Futura (2024-2025)

Technical information
- Licensing authority: ANATEL
- ERP: 2.1 kW
- Transmitter coordinates: 9°38′33.4″S 35°43′22.3″W

Links
- Public license information: Profile
- Website: redeglobo.globo.com/al/tvgazetaal

TV Asa Branca Alagoas (channel 28) is a Brazilian television station based in Maceió, capital of the state of Alagoas, carrying TV Globo for the state. The station is owned by Grupo Asa Branca, owner of the station of the same name in Caruaru, Pernambuco. Its studios are located in the Farol neighborhood and its transmitting antenna is atop the Jacintinho neighborhood, in Maceió.

== History ==
=== Background (2002-2023) ===
On April 15, 2002, the license for UHF channel 29 (later digital UHF 28) in Maceió was granted, after public contest, initiated in 1997, in which Elo Comunicação Ltda. was declared the winner. On April 20, 2005, Legislative Decree nº 274 approved the licensing act to exploit the frequency for fifteen years.

In May 2005, Rede União, one of the licensees which didn't obtain success, filed a lawsuit questioning the legality of the Legislative Decree and the bidding process. Along the Supreme Federal Court, the network requested the suspension of the decree alleging illegality in the declaration that it considered non-compliance with the provision of contractual guarantee, which would have disqualified it. The second place in the competition withdrew, which resulted in the company Elo Comunicação Ltda., classified in third place, as the winner.

On March 22, 2021, the ruling was published in which the STF dismissed the requests made by Rede União in an appeal for a regimental appeal in writ of mandamus, which had the minister Rosa Weber as rapporteur, being judged in plenary between April 12 and 19, 2021, which made the case final and unappealable in favor of the company Elo Comunicação Ltda. In 2021, the station's license was definitively protocolled by the Ministry of Communications and its implementationdefinetively plan began.

=== Dispute for the TV Globo affiliation (2023-2025) ===
On October 4, 2023, TV Globo announced to TV Gazeta de Alagoas its decision to not renew its affiliation. On October 26, 2023, it was reported that TV Globo decided to sign a contract with a new station, owned by Grupo Nordeste de Comunicação (owner of fellow Globo affiliate TV Asa Branca in Caruaru, Pernambuco). On November 8, 2023, TV Gazeta presented a petition to the bankruptcy court requesting the mandatory renewal of the affiliation contract with the Rio broadcaster, a contract that would expire on December 31, 2023. On December 5, 2023, TV Gazeta had a decision in favor of the claim and TV Globo appealed at Tribunal de Justiça de Alagoas.

On January 3, 2024, TV Globo won a victory in the Court of Justice of Alagoas, which overturned the injunction that forced the renewal with TV Gazeta until 2028. As a result, the retransmission of the programming by TV Gazeta de Alagoas was guaranteed only until the full judgment of the merits in the plenary of the 3rd Civil Chamber of the Court. On June 6, 2024, the 3rd Civil Chamber of the Alagoas Court of Justice decided, by two votes to one, to maintain the injunction that keeps TV Gazeta as a Globo affiliate for the next five years. The case can still be taken to higher courts or to the same Court by means of an appeal, or even be debated in the TJ plenary, in the case where the objective is to avoid divergence of understandings on a topic in the same Court.

==== Implementation (2023-2024) ====
The group's new TV channel began operating in the testing phase in a building purchased in the Farol neighborhood, an upscale area of Maceió, on October 23, 2023, under the name "TV Elo". On October 26, the website F5, linked to the newspaper Folha de S. Paulo, reported that TV Gazeta de Alagoas would be replaced in the first half of 2024 as a TV Globo affiliate by the new station. The new network had announced the decision early that month, justifying a STF decision that exposed the use of the Alagoas station in corruption schemes by the former president and owner Fernando Collor.

On December 31, 2023, pending a legal dispute between TV Gazeta and Globo regarding the non-renewal of the affiliation contract, "TV Elo" started relaying Canal Futura, educational arm of Globo. On January 5, by launching its campaign featuring a new visual identity, Grupo Asa Branca, by means of its founder Vicente Jorge Espíndola, confirmed TV Asa Branca's implementation process in Alagoas as TV Globo's partner in the state.

On June 21, 2024, the station officially began operating as Canal Futura Alagoas on both channels (28.1 and 28.2), and announced a partnership with Universidade Estadual de Ciências da Saúde de Alagoas to produce content. On July 2, journalist Mauro Wedekin was announced as the station's journalism director, and revealed plans to produce a local program with journalistic content. On February 24, 2025, Canal Futura Alagoas premiered Conexão Alagoas, weekly program shown on Mondays, from 9pm, presented by Mauro Wedekin.

=== TV Globo affiliate (2025-present) ===
On September 26, 2025, the president of the Supreme Federal Court (STF), Luís Roberto Barroso, accepted a request from TV Globo to revoke the decision that forced the Rio network to renew the contract with TV Gazeta. With that, from midnight on September 27, channel 28.1 pwas renamed TV Asa Branca Alagoas, airing an announcement declaring the new affiliation and began rebroadcasting Globo's programming. The former affiliate, however, did not leave the network, and with that, the two started relaying the network simultaneously.

From today, TV Asa Branca writes one of the most important chapters in the history of Brazilian television.

TV Asa Branca becomes Rede Globo's affiliate in Alagoas, consolidating Grupo Asa Branca's expansion, which, for thirty-four years, has worked tirelessly for impartial, ethical and plural journalism. The new station will continue on this path.

With our dear Alagoas residents, in addition to a special greeting, we are committed to bringing the most relevant news of the day, prioritizing topics of public interest in any of the one hundred and two municipalities in Alagoas.

We extend our hand to the advertising market and recognize the talent of the professionals who create the present here and help develop the future of Alagoas.

Welcome, TV Asa Branca Alagoas, Globo’s new affiliate in the state.

Alagoas is already on air.

— TV Asa Branca Alagoas in the announcement shown around midnight on September 27, 2025

As it was not prepared to produce and show local programs at the time of the court decision, TV Asa Branca Alagoas began to retransmit local news programs from TV Globo Pernambuco, which on Saturday had the participation of the station's director of journalism, Mauro Wedekin, to announce the new affiliation. The selection of professionals to join the broadcaster's team takes place from the 29th. The broadcaster's first news program, ABTV 2ª Edição, provisionally presented by Mauro, is scheduled to premiere on October 1st.

TV Gazeta would only stop broadcasting Globo's programming definitively at around 2:44 p.m., with the end of the rerun of Terra Nostra. From that time on, Asa Branca would become exclusively affiliated with TV Globo. Before TV Gazeta's decision, which had been accused of piracy by Globo, its entire newscasts were removed from Globoplay and the live streaming signal was temporarily replaced by TV Globo São Paulo, until it was taken over by the new affiliate. The new television news program, however, was delayed until October 6, when it premiered with Nathália Lopes as the anchor.

The debut of the television news program was marked by technical glitches in the virtual set, generated using chroma key, in the audio volume, and a lack of preparation for the return from commercial breaks. In addition, with no local commercials sold, ABTV 2ª Edição replayed a complete report from Fantástico, aired the previous day, to fill the space. The program also exceeded the time allocated for local production, cutting the beginning of the telenovela Dona de Mim.

== Technical information ==
Virtual	Physical	Screen	Content
28.1	28 UHF	1080i	TV Asa Branca Alagoas/Globo's main schedule
28.2	28 UHF	1080i	Canal Futura

The broadcaster began its digital transmissions on an experimental basis on October 23, 2023. On December 31, 2023, tests began with the Canal Futura signal. On September 27, 2025, when the station became a Globo affiliate, Canal Futura moved entirely to subchannel 28.2.

TV Asa Branca's signal as of September 27 is extremely limited, having only two relay stations, channel 14.1 in Delmiro Gouveia and channel 15.1 in Arapiraca, leaving many locals without access to Globo's programming. The station plans to expand its coverage area.

== Programming ==
In addition to retransmitting TV Globo's national programming, TV Asa Branca Alagoas is provisionally showing local programs from TV Globo Pernambuco until the debut of its first news program on October 1. As Canal Futura Alagoas, the station produced Conexão Alagoas, which had its last edition shown on September 24, 2025, before the court decision that authorized the beginning of operation as an affiliate of Globo.
