= Mix FM (Brazil) =

Brazilian radio network

- Type: Broadcast radio network
- Country: Brazil
- Headquarters: São Paulo, São Paulo

Programming
- Language(s): Portuguese
- Format: Music; CHR

Ownership
- Owner: Rádio SP-Um Ltda.
- Parent: Grupo Mix de Comunicação
- Sister stations: RBI TV; Rádio Trianon

History
- Launch date: 4 July 2004

Links
- Webcast: Listen live
- Website: radiomixfm.com.br

Mix FM (also known as Rede Mix de Rádio) is a Brazilian CHR radio network founded in 2004 from Mix FM São Paulo, which has been on the air since 1995 as Rádio SP-1, and began operating under its current name in 1996.

Mix FM has affiliates in 20 Brazilian states: São Paulo, Amazonas, Rondônia, Pará, Piauí, Rio Grande do Norte, Paraíba, Alagoas, Bahia, Goiás, Mato Grosso, Minas Gerais, Espírito Santo, Rio de Janeiro, Paraná, Santa Catarina, Rio Grande do Sul, Ceará, Pernambuco, as well as the Federal District. It is therefore present in all five regions of Brazil. Most of the station's listeners are young people between the ages of 20 and 30, precisely because it plays pop music. The station is operated by Grupo Mix de Comunicação, which belongs to Grupo Objetivo and has its headquarters in Rua Vergueiro, in the city of São Paulo, SP.

== History ==
The network's parent company, Mix FM São Paulo, was inaugurated in 1995 as Rádio SP-1, gaining its current name on November 1, 1996. Since its inception, the radio station had a profile aimed at a qualified young audience up to the age of 29 and dedicated its musical programming to pop (national and international) and rock.

In 2001, Mix FM began to design its radio network model, initiating conversations with potential partner stations. In June 2001, Mix FM already had an affiliate in the city of Santos, but without satellite transmission, only local transmission on an experimental basis. Rede Mix de Rádio was officially launched at 9 pm on July 4, 2004 with three affiliates, joining two that were locally branded and one launched with satellite operation.

== Stations ==
Call sign	Frequency	Headquarters / City of license	First air date
ZYU 820	91.9 MHz	Atibaia	2008
ZYU 947	101.1 MHz	Campinas / Valinhos	2010
ZYD 468	102.1 MHz	Rio de Janeiro	2007
ZYM 688	106.3 MHz	São Paulo	1996
ZYR 142	94.9 MHz	São José dos Campos / Jambeiro	—N/a
ZYC 248	100.7 MHz	Manaus	—N/a
ZYS 319	98.3 MHz	Maceió	—N/a
ZYC 235	103.3 MHz	Arapiraca	—N/a
ZYV 526	104.3 MHz	Salvador / Camaçari	—N/a
ZYE 414	107.5 MHz	Fortaleza / Cascavel	—N/a
ZYT 237	88.3 MHz	Brasília / Valparaíso de Goiás	—N/a
ZYS 961	106.3 MHz	Vitória / Serra	—N/a
ZYV 910	106.1 MHz	Goiânia / Senador Canedo	—N/a
ZYL 658	93.3 MHz	Cuiabá / Várzea Grande	—N/a
ZYR 393	90.3 MHz	Belo Horizonte / Juatuba	—N/a
ZYV 469	106.5 MHz	Uberlândia	—N/a
ZYD 206	100.9 MHz	Belém	—N/a
ZYR 572	100.9 MHz	Santarém	—N/a
ZYC 972	93.7 MHz	João Pessoa	—N/a
ZYR 616	104.7 MHz	Campina Grande	—N/a
ZYO 478	98.3 MHz	Curitiba / Piraquara	—N/a
LRH 702	91.1 MHz	Foz do Iguaçu / Puerto Iguazu	—N/a
ZYD 399	102.9 MHz	Londrina	—N/a
ZYD 365	97.9 MHz	Maringá	—N/a
ZYD 369	94.7 MHz	Ponta Grossa	—N/a
ZYT 798	97.1 MHz	Recife / Paudalho	—N/a
ZYN 952	91.5 MHz	Teresina / Altos	—N/a
ZYD 514	103.9 MHz	Natal	—N/a
ZYD 636	107.1 MHz	Porto Alegre / Canoas	—N/a
ZYW 301	99.1 MHz	Ji-Paraná	—N/a
ZYU 518	106.3 MHz	Blumenau / Indaial	—N/a
ZYV 246	91.1 MHz	Criciúma / Içara	—N/a
ZYU 530	103.1 MHz	Laguna	—N/a
ZYU 326	91.7 MHz	Ribeirão Preto	—N/a
ZYM 907	103.3 MHz	São Carlos / Itirapina	—N/a
ZYE 328	103.9 MHz	Dracena / Paulicéia	—N/a
ZYM 678	102.9 MHz	Capão Bonito	—N/a
ZYW 693	105.3 MHz	Fernandópolis / Estrela d'Oeste	—N/a
ZYM 941	106.7 MHz	Guaratinguetá / Piquete	—N/a
ZYE 321	106.7 MHz	Presidente Prudente / Regente Feijó	—N/a
ZYW 709	107.9 MHz	São José do Rio Preto / Tanabi	—N/a
