= Band RN =

TV Bandeirantes Rio Grande do Norte (ZYP 261)
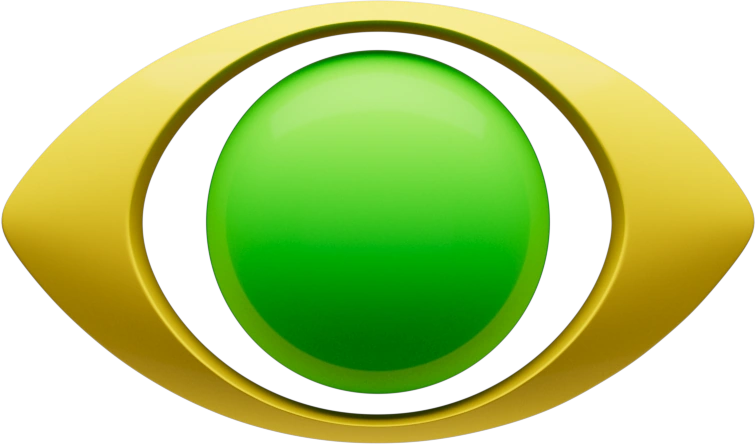
- Natal, Rio Grande do Norte; Brazil
- Channels: Digital: 30 (UHF); Virtual: 3
- Branding: Band RN

Programming
- Affiliations: Rede Bandeirantes

Ownership
- Owner: Grupo Bandeirantes de Comunicação; (Televisão Novos Tempos S/A)

History
- First air date: September 7, 1990
- Former call signs: ZYB 564 (1990-2018)
- Former names: TV Potengi (1990–2008); TV Bandeirantes Natal (2008–2018)
- Former channel numbers: Analog: 3 (VHF, 1990-2018)

Technical information
- Licensing authority: ANATEL
- ERP: 3.4 kW
- Transmitter coordinates: 5°47′49.9″S 35°11′46.1″W

Links
- Public license information: Profile
- Website: ibandrn.com.br

Band RN (channel 3) is a Rede Bandeirantes-owned-and-operated station licensed to the city of Natal, capital of the state of Rio Grande do Norte. Its studios are located in the Candelária neighborhood and its transmitting antenna is located at Parque das Dunas, in Tirol. The station also has a subsidiary in Maceió, Alagoas, operating commercially as Band Maceió.

== History ==
=== TV Potengi (1990-2008) ===
In the late 80s, former Rio Grande do Norte senator Geraldo Melo, won the license for channel 3 in Natal from the federal government. The trading name of the new company, Televisão Novos Tempos Ltda. (still in use) was a reference to the institutional slogan of Melo's management in front of the state government, between 1987 and 1991.

TV Potengi started broadcasting on September 7, 1990, Brazil's Independence day, becoming the fifth station in the city and joined Rede Bandeirantes as a charter affiliate. It was known for its coverage of special events, such as the visit of Pope John Paul II to Natal em 1991, elections, surf, kart and futebol tournaments, Carnatal, among others. It was also the first station in the state to use a systemical mobile unit in live links and reports.

In the mid-90s, a crisis caused the station to suspend its local programming for a few years, including the change of its headquarters to a small office in the Alecrim neighborhood, and discarding most of its equipments. In August 2007, the state press reported that Johnny Saad, president of Grupo Bandeirantes de Comunicação, became a shareholder at the station, in order to receive investments and have a recovery of its finances.

=== Band O&O (2008-present) ===
Eventually, Grupo Bandeirantes de Comunicação took full control of TV Potengi, and on October 28, 2008, the station was renamed Band Natal, becoming the network's twelfth owned-and-operated station. From then on, the station started leading an expansion process in the Northeast Region, which had states without affiliates (Ceará, Sergipe and Alagoas), through a schedule that catered to the regional population in general. However, only Fortaleza and Maceió and adjacent cities received the signal of Band Natal. In Aracaju, the relay of Band Bahia was opted.

Band Natal generated two feeds: the first feed was limited to its over-the-air coverage area, the state of Rio Grande do Norte, where Band's networked programming interspersed with local programming was shown. The second feed, known as Band Nordeste, was available by satellite, with third-party regional programming and its own parallel advertising services.

This feed was seen in Fortaleza on UHF channel 20, with medium signal power. With TV Jangadeiro resuming its Band affiliation in 2012, Band Nordeste's signal was cut and started to provisionally relay NordesTV, which was launched as an SBT affiliate. When NordesTV moved there to UHF channel 27, channel 20 started relaying Rede 21, Grupo Bandeirantes's other over-the-air network.

On August 31, 2018, the station abandoned the name Band Natal as a secondary brand, adopting Band RN. In 2019, Band increased its presence in Alagoas, creating a studio in Maceió, as well as hiring journalists Luiz Alberto Fonseca and Henrique Pereira, coming from TV Pajuçara, to create its first newscast from Maceió and also seen in Rio Grande do Norte, Bora NE. In 2020, the station acquired the rights to air Campeonato Alagoano de Futebol, generated in Alagoas and also shown in Rio Grande do Norte.

On August 14, 2020, Band RN announced the coverage of Campeonato Brasileiro Série D, airing Futebol ABC's matches. On August 17, Bora RN started, presented by Mariana Rocha and Heloísa Guimarães.

On February 1, 2021, the station agreed with Federação Norte Rio Grandense de Futebol to carry Campeonato Potiguar de Futebol, valid for the 2021 and 2022 seasons, with exclusive over-the-air matches airing on Sunday afternoons, as well as a few slots on Wednesday nights on the national network.

== Technical information ==
Virtual channel	Digital channel	Screen	Content
3.1	30 UHF	1080i	Band RN/Band's main schedule

On June 11, 2010, Band Natal started its digital broadcasts on UHF channel 39, becoming the second station in Rio Grande do Norte to do so.

In 2020, with the suspension of physical classes due to the pandemic, the station signed partnerships with state and municipal education departments to provide classes for students. On subchannel 2.3, 6th-9th grade students from Parnamirim started to follow these classes from August 17. On September 8, classes for the municipal school network of Natal, for 9th graders, started, on subchannel 2.2. On October 14, most students from the state school network, pertaining to middle and high school grades, started following their classes on subchannel 2.4.

=== Analog-to-digital conversion ===
The station closed its analog signal on VHF channel 3 on May 30, 2018, following the official ANATEL roadmap.
