= Pedro Collor de Mello =

Brazilian media magnate and politician

- Born: Pedro Affonso Collor de Mello; December 14, 1952; Maceió, Alagoas, Brazil
- Died: December 19, 1994 (aged 42); New York City, New York, United States
- Occupation: politician
- Relatives: Fernando Collor de Mello (brother)

Pedro Affonso Collor de Melo (14 December 1952 – 19 December 1994) was the brother of former Brazilian president Fernando Collor. Working for the Collor family's newspaper Gazeta de Alagoas, Pedro Collor gained prominence when he made a series of accusations against his brother, who was then president. The allegations include corruption, and drug use. Pedro Collor's revelations helped precipitate his brother's downfall in 1992. Pedro Collor died of brain cancer in 1994.
