= TV Pajuçara =

TV Pajuçara (ZYA 222)
- Maceió, Alagoas; Brazil
- Channels: Digital: 43 (UHF); Virtual: 11
- Branding: TV Pajuçara

Programming
- Affiliations: Record

Ownership
- Owner: Pajuçara Sistema de Comunicação (PSCOM); (TV Pajuçara Ltda.)

History
- Founded: June 15, 1988
- First air date: January 11, 1992
- Former channel numbers: Analog: 11 (VHF, 1992–2018)
- Former affiliations: SBT (1992-2006)

Technical information
- Licensing authority: ANATEL
- ERP: 3 kW
- Transmitter coordinates: 9°39′48.2″S 35°44′6.4″W

Links
- Public license information: Profile
- Website: pajucara.tnh1.com.br/tv

TV Pajuçara (channel 11) is a Brazilian television station based in Maceió, capital of the state of Alagoas, carrying Record for the state, owned-and-operated by locally based linked to businessman and politician João Tenório, who also controls radio station Pajuçara FM and the TNH1 news portal.

== History ==
Its license was granted by the federal government on June 15, 1988.

The station was founded on January 11, 1992, as an affiliate of SBT, and has always sought varied programming, based on entertainment and journalism. TV also expanded its signal, in a process of inland signal expansion, reaching 98% of households in Alagoas.

On July 20, 2006, TV Pajuçara opened a branch in Arapiraca, together with radio Pajuçara FM Arapiraca. On July 23, the station left SBT and became affiliated with Rede Record, after deciding not to renew the contract due to constant schedule changes in programming and the lack of journalism on the network. With that, Record now had affiliates in all states of Northeast Brazil, coinciding with the recent deal with TV Atalaia in Sergipe. SBT would only recoup its lost affiliation in 2007, when TV Alagoas left Rede Bandeirantes and became its affiliate on February 12th.

On January 18, 2009, the station stopped transmitting inland via microwave and began transmitting via satellite. The first retransmitter with the new technology was inaugurated in the city of Murici, through VHF channel 4.

At the beginning of 2011, TV Pajuçara created Pajuçara Cidadania, a Fica Alerta special held once a month in the neighborhoods of Maceió, which brings community services and different attractions to the local population. On March 17, the broadcaster premiered the program Esporte Campeão, presented by Eduardo Canuto, which had already been presented by BigTV and TV Alagoas. In its daily programming, the broadcaster relaunched Casa & Negócio, the first program on the schedule to be produced in high definition.

In November 2014, journalist Rachel Amorim, who presented Jornal da Pajuçara Noite alongside Mauro Wedekin, left the station and returned to TV Alagoas. In his place came Gilka Mafra, who left TV Gazeta after 16 years after being hired by TV Pajuçara.

In May 2022, the station announced that it hired journalist Douglas Lopes, who left TV Gazeta after 25 years. On September 29, TV Pajuçara was recognized at Prêmio Sebrae de Jornalismo in Alagoas, receiving awards in the categories of photography, video and reporting.

== Technical information ==
Virtual channel	Digital channel	Screen	Content
11.1	43 UHF	1080i	TV Pajuçara/Record's main schedule

Based on the federal decree transitioning Brazilian TV stations from analogue to digital signals, TV Pajuçara, as well as the other stations in Maceió, ceased broadcasting on VHF channel 11 on May 30, 2018, following the official schedule of the ANATEL.

== Sports coverage ==
TV Pajuçara had the rights to air Campeonato Alagoano de Futebol between 2008 and 2014, which would be shown until 2015 exclusively on over-the-air television by the station. However, Federação Alagoana de Futebol broke the contract it had with TV Pajuçara at the end of 2014, and signed with TV Gazeta, in a controversial action.
