= Craíbas =

Municipality in Alagoas, Brazil

- Municipality of Alagoas, Brazil
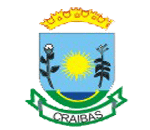
- Flag Coat of arms
- Etymology: Derived from the name of the Craibeira (Tabebuia aurea) tree
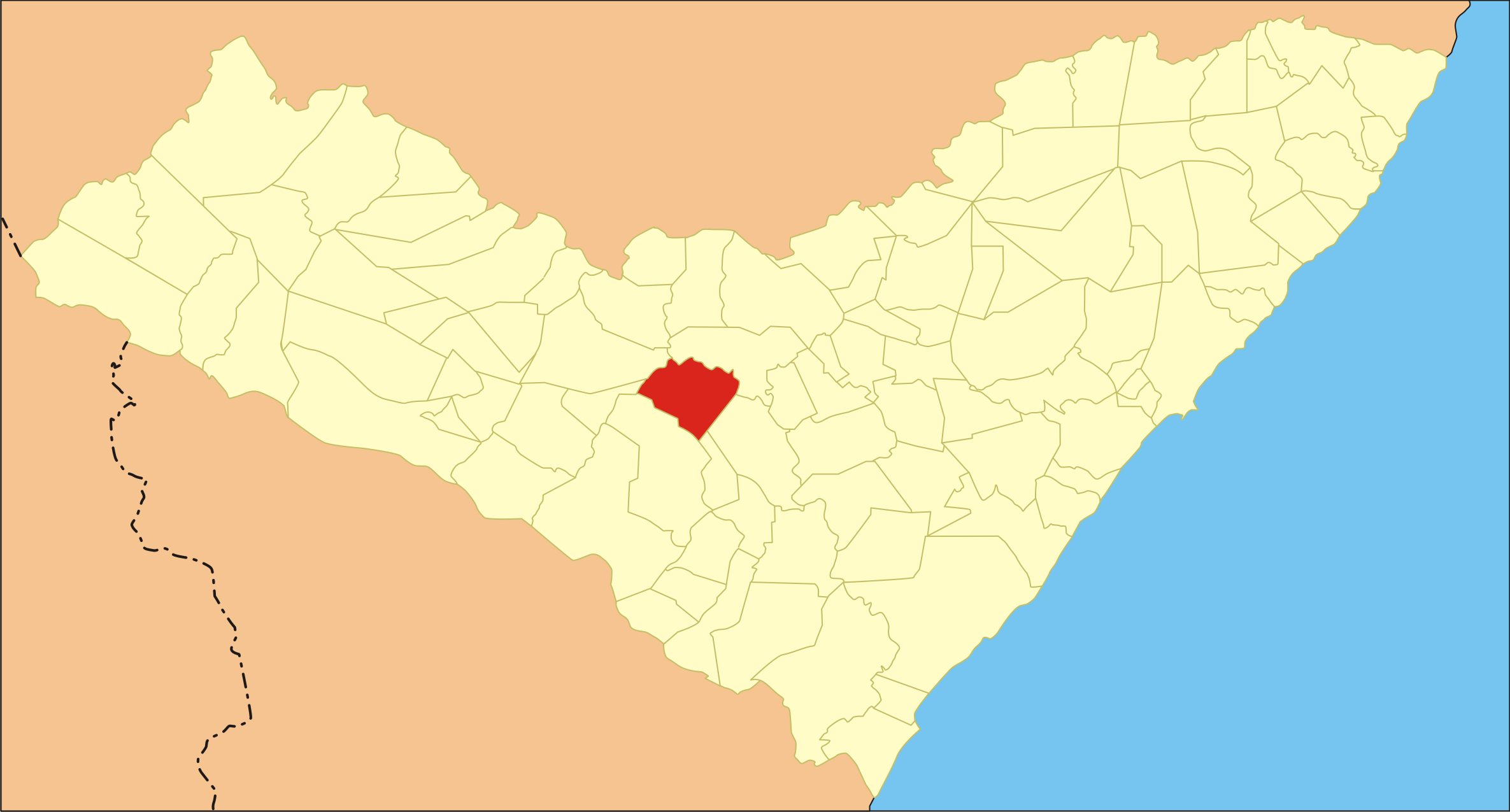
- Location of Craíbas in Alagoas

- Location within Brazil Location within South America
- Coordinates: 09°37′04″S 36°46′04″W
- Country: Brazil
- Region: Northeast
- State: Alagoas
- Founded: 23 April 1982

Government
  - Mayor: Teófilo José Barroso Pereira (PP) (2025-2028)
  - Vice Mayor: Sebastião Barbosa da Silva (UNIÃO) (2025-2028)

Area
  - Total: 278.879 km^{2} (107.676 sq mi)
- Elevation: 252 m (827 ft)

Population (2022)
  - Total: 25,397
  - Density: 91.07/km^{2} (235.9/sq mi)
- Demonym: Craibense (Brazilian Portuguese)
- Time zone: UTC-03:00 (Brasília Time)
- Postal Code: 57320-000
- HDI (2010): 0.525 – low
- Website: craibas.al.gov.br

Craíbas (Central northeastern portuguese pronunciation: [kɾɐˈibɐ(s)]) is a municipality located in the western of the Brazilian state of Alagoas. Its population is 24,309 (2020) and its area is 275 km^{2} (106 sq mi).

== See also ==
- List of municipalities in Alagoas
