= Major Izidoro =

Municipality in Alagoas, Brazil

- Municipality of Alagoas, Brazil
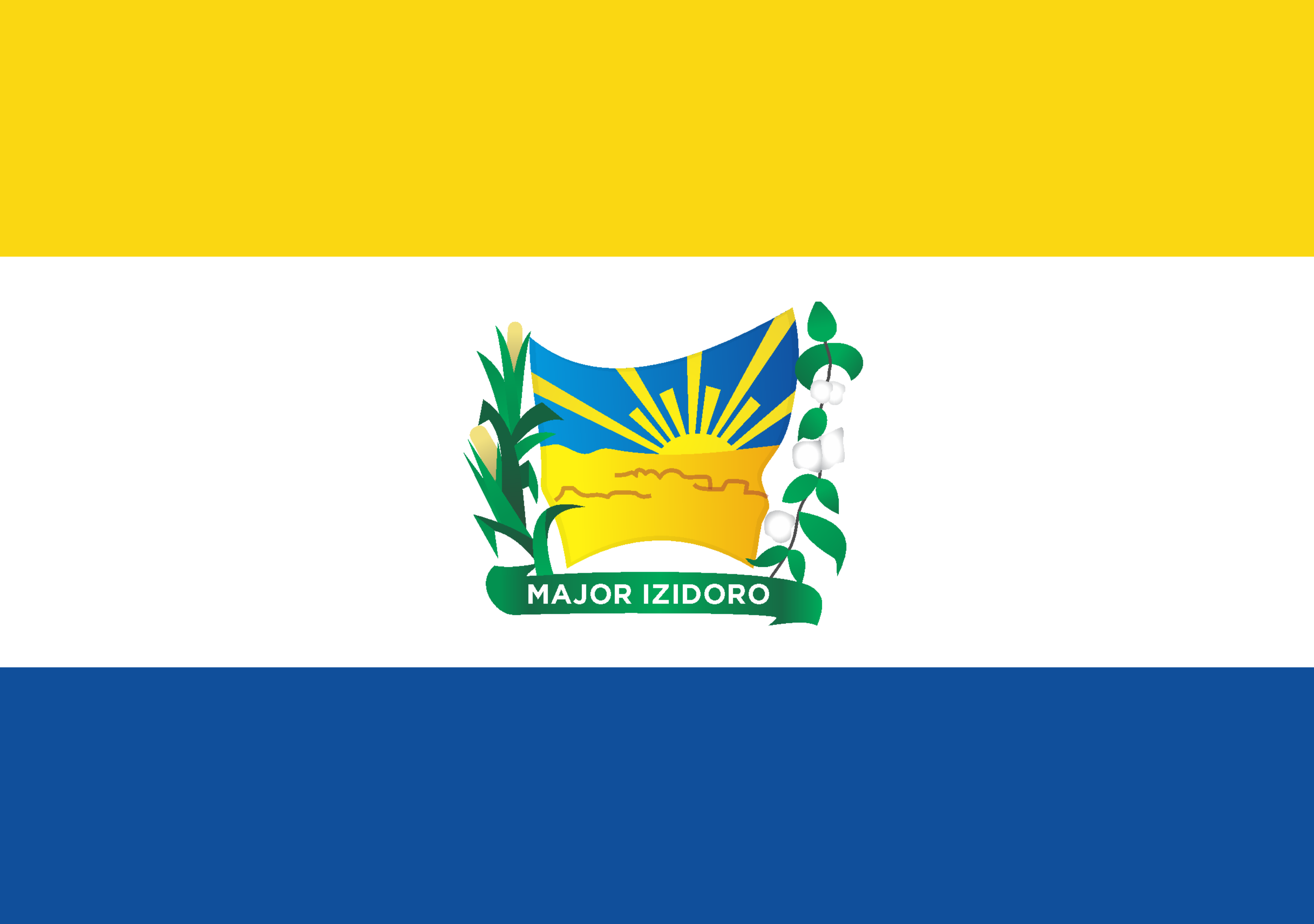
- Flag
- Etymology: Named after a man who resided in the area of great prestige and who fought for the district to be elevated to municipality status
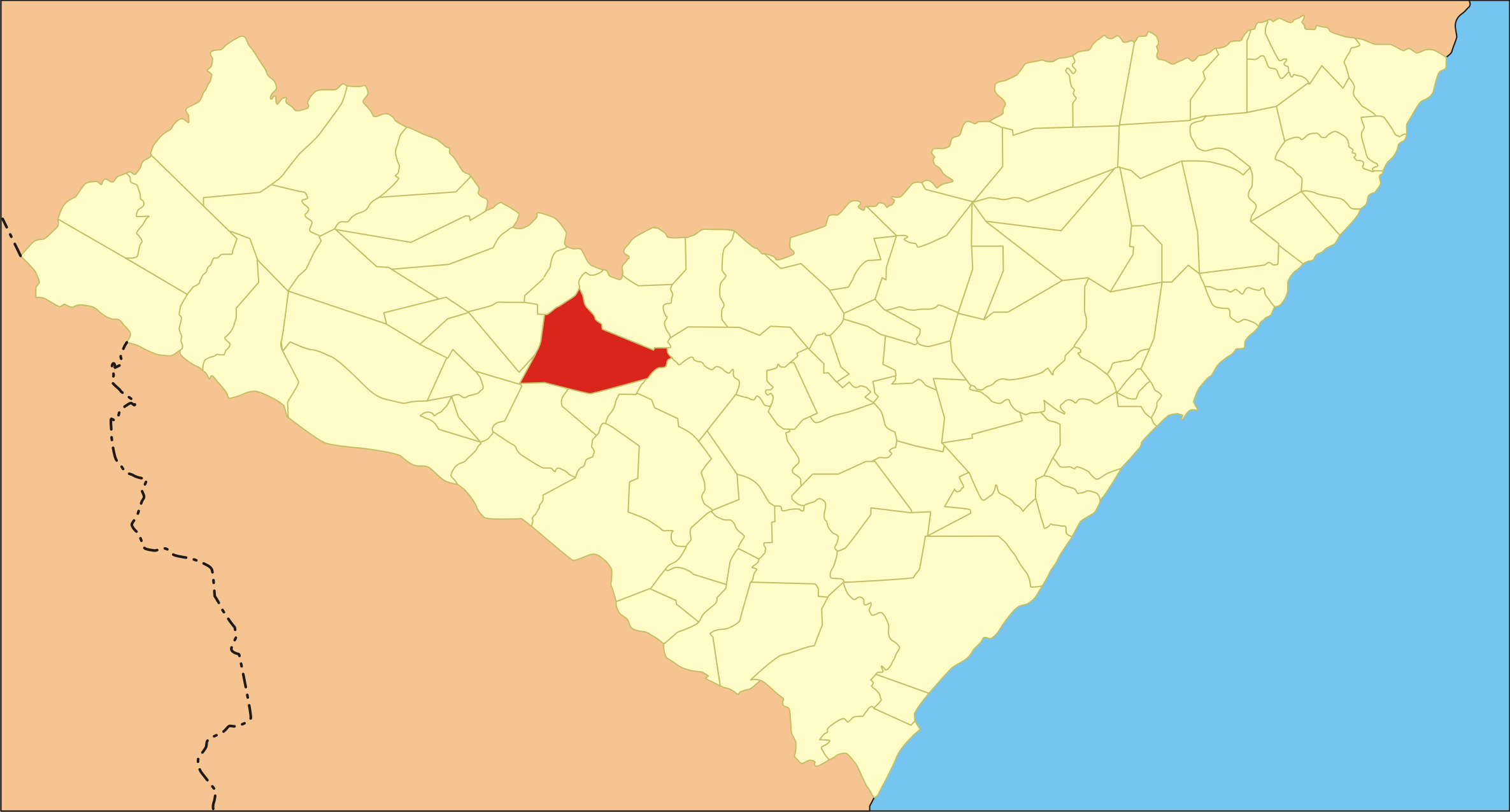
- Location of Major Izidoro in Alagoas

- Location within Brazil Location within South America
- Coordinates: 9°31′55″S 36°59′6″W
- Country: Brazil
- Region: Northeast
- State: Alagoas
- Founded: 17 September 1949

Government
  - Mayor: Theobaldo Cavalcanti Lins Netto (MDB) (2025-2028)
  - Vice Mayor: Italo Tavares Suruagy do Amaral (PSB) (2025-2028)

Area
  - Total: 437.603 km^{2} (168.959 sq mi)
- Elevation: 188 m (617 ft)

Population (2022)
  - Total: 17,700
  - Density: 39.98/km^{2} (103.5/sq mi)
- Demonym: Isidorense (Brazilian Portuguese)
- Time zone: UTC-03:00 (Brasília Time)
- Postal code: 57580-000, 57585-000
- HDI (2010): 0.566 – medium
- Website: majorizidoro.al.gov.br

Major Izidoro (Central northeastern portuguese pronunciation: [maˈʒɔ iziˈdɔrʊ]) is a municipality located in the center of the Brazilian state of Alagoas. Its population is 19,864 (2020) and its area is 454 km^{2} (175 sq mi).

== See also ==
- List of municipalities in Alagoas
