= Lagoa da Canoa =

Municipality in Alagoas, Brazil

- Municipality of Alagoas, Brazil
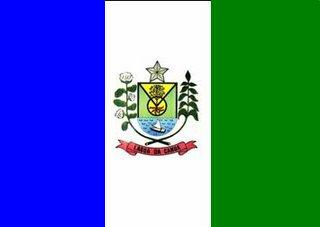
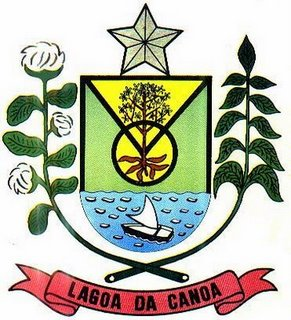
- Flag Coat of arms
- Etymology: In English "Lake of the Canoe", named after a lake in the region where residents used to fish from canoes
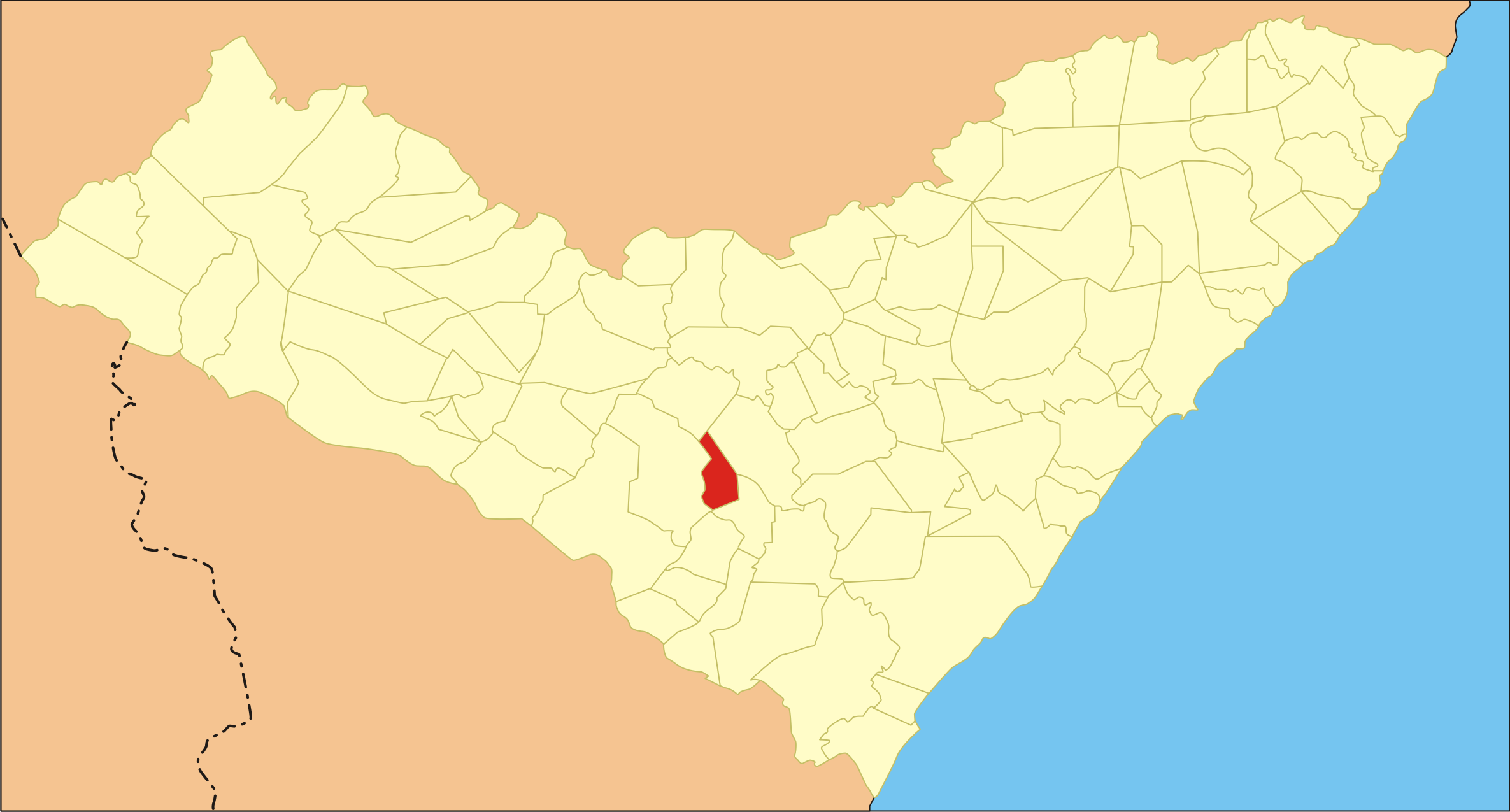
- Location of Lagoa da Canoa in Alagoas

- Location within Brazil Location within South America
- Coordinates: 9°49′48″S 36°44′16″W
- Country: Brazil
- Region: Northeast
- State: Alagoas
- Founded: 28 August 1962

Government
  - Mayor: Edilza Alves de Souza (PP) (2025-2028)
  - Vice Mayor: Jadielson Tavares Rodrigues (PP) (2025-2028)

Area
  - Total: 83.621 km^{2} (32.286 sq mi)
- Elevation: 349 m (1,145 ft)

Population (2022)
  - Total: 18,457
  - Density: 220.72/km^{2} (571.7/sq mi)
- Demonym: Canoense (Brazilian Portuguese)
- Time zone: UTC-03:00 (Brasília Time)
- Postal code: 57330-000
- HDI (2010): 0.552 – medium
- Website: lagoadacanoa.al.gov.br

Lagoa da Canoa (Central northeastern portuguese pronunciation: [lɐˈɡoɐ ˈda kɐ̃ˈnoɐ]) is a municipality located in the Brazilian state of Alagoas. Its population is 17,771 (2020) and its area is 103 km^{2} (40 sq mi).

== See also ==
- List of municipalities in Alagoas
