= Feira Grande =

Municipality in Alagoas, Brazil

- Municipality of Alagoas, Brazil
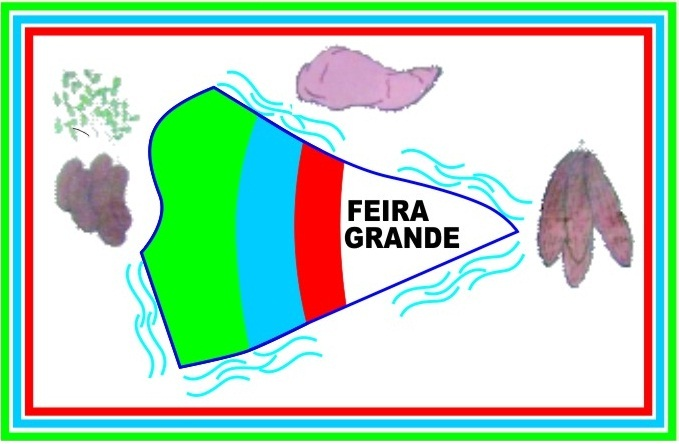
- Flag
- Etymology: In English "Grand Fair" due to the large city fair during the construction of the Northeast Railway Network
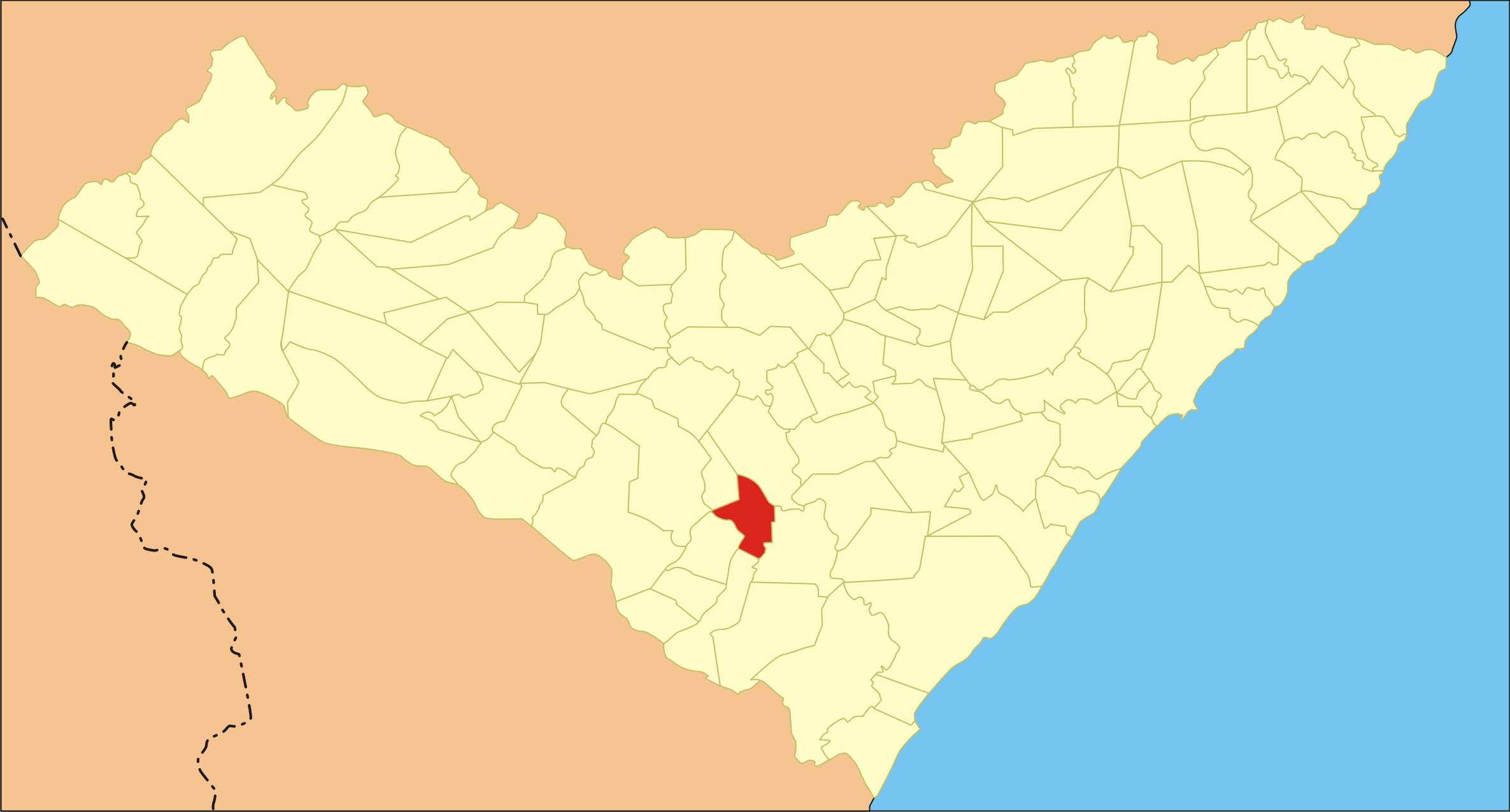
- Location of Feira Grande in Alagoas

- Location within Brazil Location within South America
- Coordinates: 09°54′00″S 36°40′40″W
- Country: Brazil
- Region: Northeast
- State: Alagoas
- Founded: 5 April 1954

Government
  - Mayor: Dário Roberto Silva Lira (MDB) (2025-2028)
  - Vice Mayor: Romario da Silva Santos (PSB) (2025-2028)

Area
  - Total: 175.906 km^{2} (67.918 sq mi)
- Elevation: 154 m (505 ft)

Population (2022)
  - Total: 22,712
  - Density: 129.11/km^{2} (334.4/sq mi)
- Demonym: Feira-grandense (Brazilian Portuguese)
- Time zone: UTC-03:00 (Brasília Time)
- Postal Code: 57340-000
- HDI (2010): 0.533 – low
- Website: feiragrande.al.gov.br

Feira Grande (Central northeastern portuguese pronunciation: [ˈfeɾɐ ˈɡɾɐ̃di]) is a municipality located in the western region of the Brazilian state of Alagoas. Its population was 22,178 (2020) and its area is 156 square kilometres (60 sq mi).

== See also ==
- List of municipalities in Alagoas
