= Tanque d'Arca =

Municipality of Alagoas, Brazil

- Municipality of Alagoas, Brazil
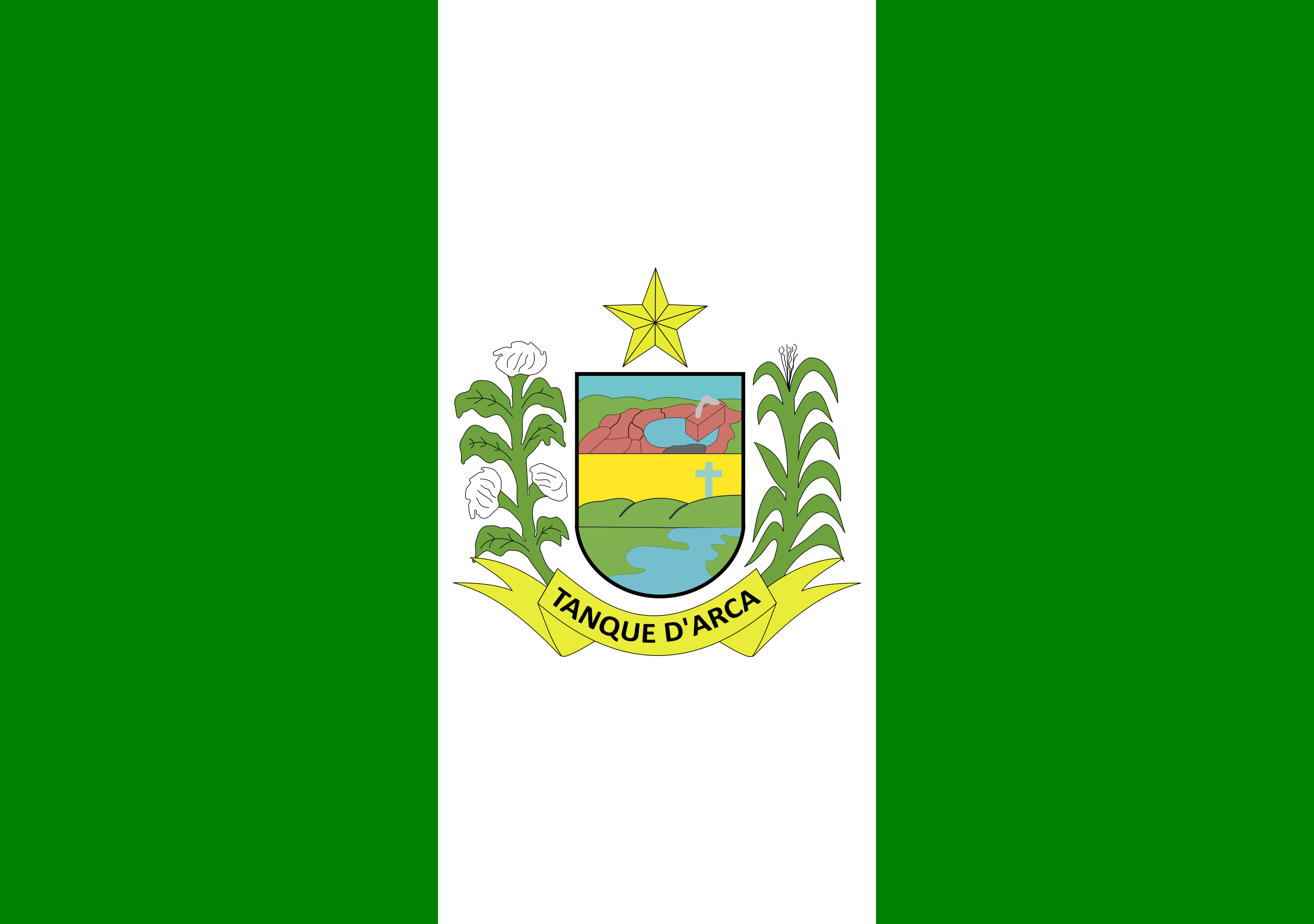
- Flag
- Etymology: In English "Tank of the Chest", referring to a natural water tank (tanque) under an Oitizeiro tree (Moquilea tomentosa) which contained a chest (arca) with artifacts
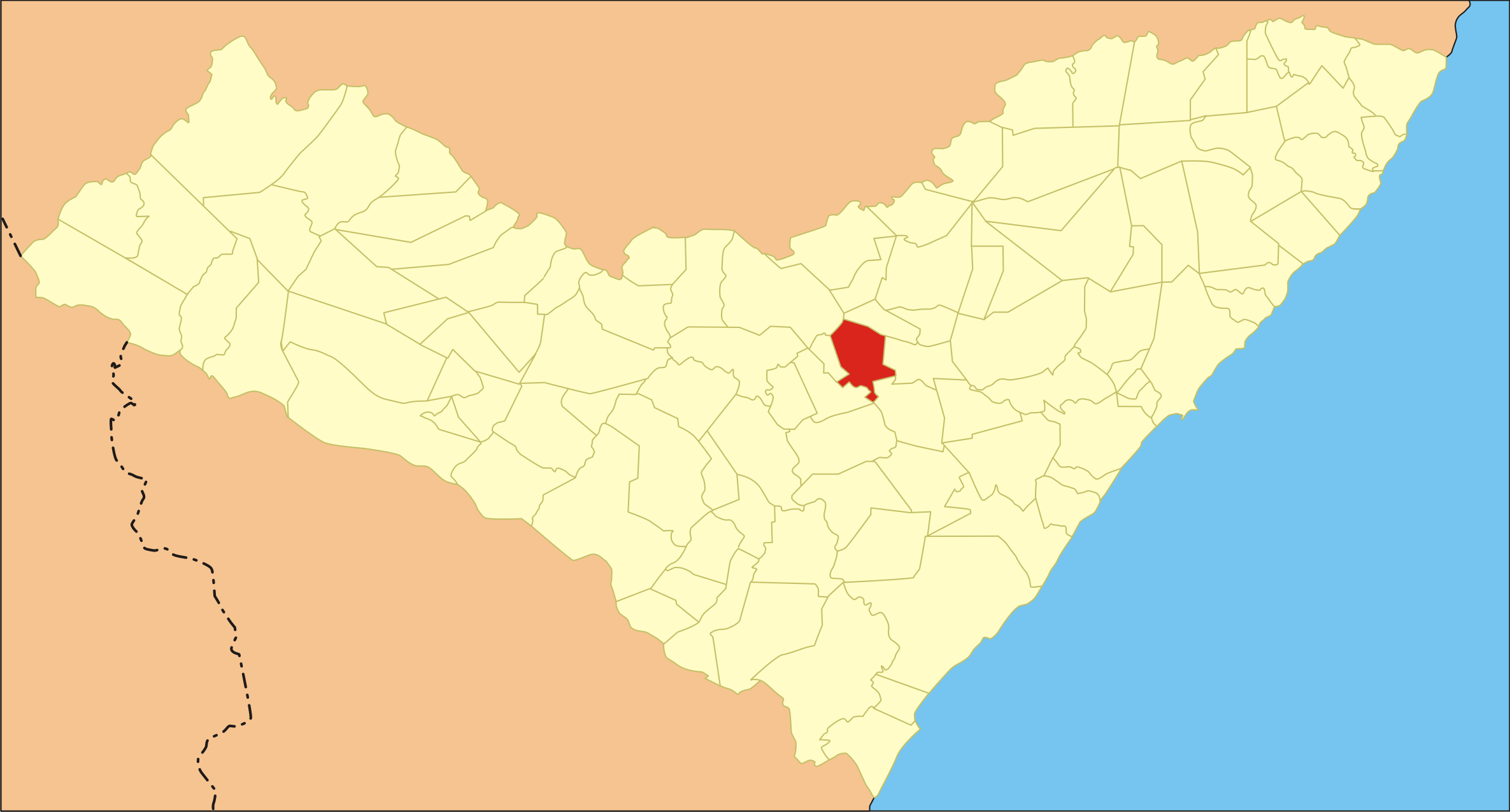
- Location of Tanque d'Arca in Alagoas

- Location within Brazil Location within South America
- Coordinates: 09°31′55″S 36°25′58″W
- Country: Brazil
- Region: Northeast
- State: Alagoas
- Founded: 1 December 1962

Government
  - Mayor: Juvenil Lopes de Oliveira (MDB) (2025-2028)
  - Vice Mayor: Jean Cegalan Santos de Lima (PSB) (2025-2028)

Area
  - Total: 124.617 km^{2} (48.115 sq mi)
- Elevation: 200 m (660 ft)

Population (2022)
  - Total: 5,796
  - Density: 46.51/km^{2} (120.5/sq mi)
- Demonym: Tanquense (Brazilian Portuguese)
- Time zone: UTC-03:00 (Brasília Time)
- Postal Code: 57635-000
- HDI (2010): 0.555 – medium
- Website: tanquedarca.al.gov.br

Tanque d'Arca (Central northeastern portuguese pronunciation: [ˈtɐ̃jki ˈdɐʁkɐ]) is a municipality located in the center of the Brazilian state of Alagoas. In 2020, its population was 6,138. Its area is 156 km^{2} (60 sq mi).

== See also ==
- List of municipalities in Alagoas
