= Maribondo =

Municipality of Alagoas, Brazil

- Municipality of Alagoas, Brazil
- Etymology: Means in Brazilian Portuguese "Wasp", due to the existence of a large wasp nest in the area
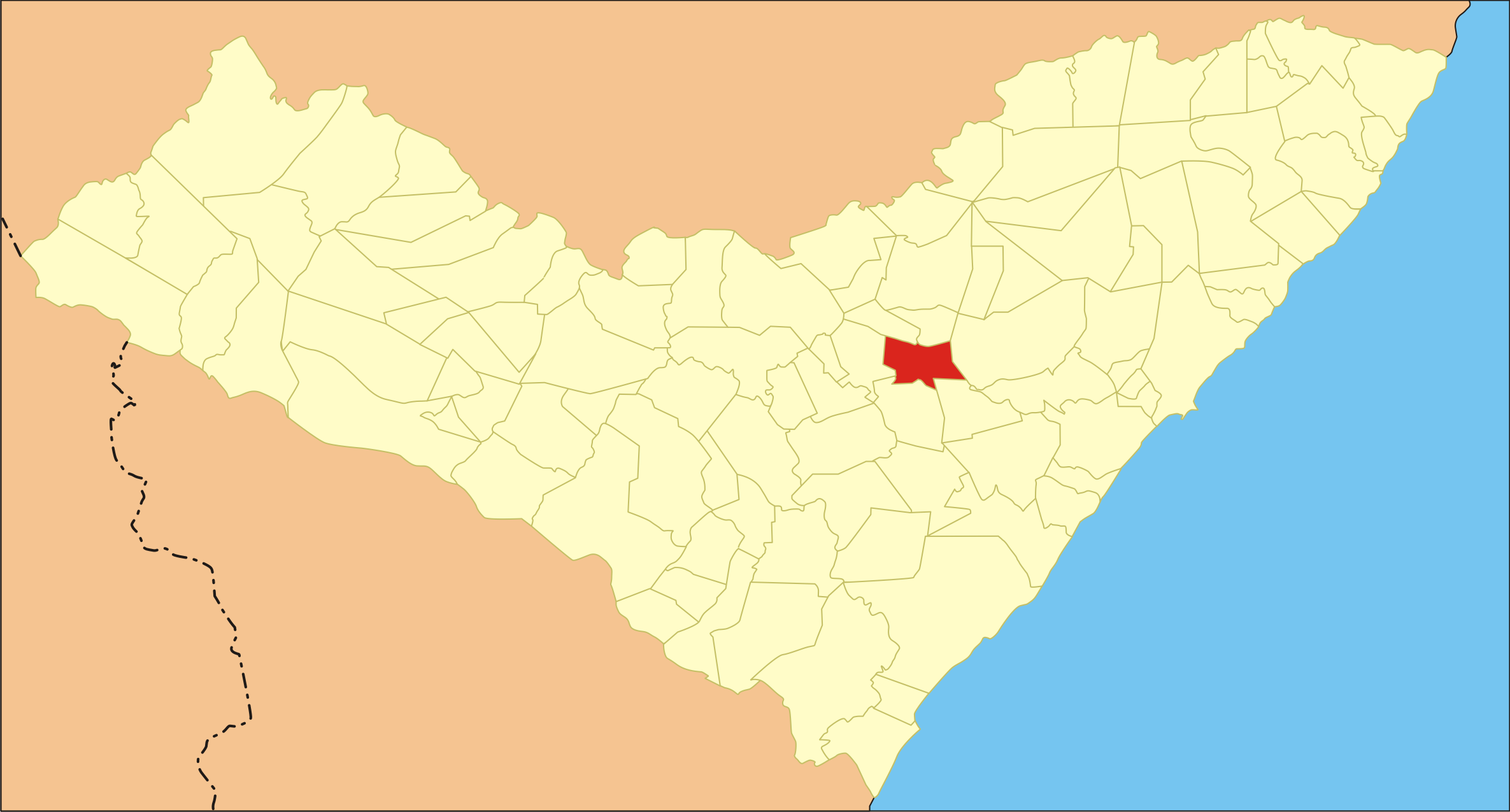
- Location of Maribondo in Alagoas

- Location within Brazil Location within South America
- Coordinates: 9°34′37″S 36°18′18″W
- Country: Brazil
- Region: Northeast
- State: Alagoas
- Founded: 24 August 1962

Government
  - Mayor: Bruno Zeferino do Carmo Teixeira (PSB) (2025-2028)
  - Vice Mayor: José Ubiratan Ferreira Nunes (MDB) (2025-2028)

Area
  - Total: 180.107 km^{2} (69.540 sq mi)
- Elevation: 162 m (531 ft)

Population (2022)
  - Total: 13,679
  - Density: 75.95/km^{2} (196.7/sq mi)
- Demonym: Maribondense (Brazilian Portuguese)
- Time zone: UTC-03:00 (Brasília Time)
- Postal code: 57670-000
- HDI (2010): 0.597 – medium
- Website: maribondo.al.gov.br

Maribondo (Central northeastern portuguese pronunciation: [mɐɾiˈbõdʊ]) is a municipality located in the Brazilian state of Alagoas. Its population is 13,193 (2020) and its area is 171 km^{2}.

== History ==
Small place called Poço da Caatinga was established in 1905, 18 kilometers away from Anadia, and had this name for having a well of clear water located between Inga and Cassia fistula trees. In the middle of the vegetation a large house of Wasps (maribondos) was formed, and the place became called Poço da Casa de Maribondos. Among farms, José Sapucaia de Araújo's was the one that developed the most, with the installation of the first cotton steamer in 1910. In 1913, the Azevedo family arrived in the region and, soon after, José Xavier de Azevedo installed the first fair, destroyed by the Anadia municipal guard.

The history of the town recognizes as its founder João Antônio dos Santos, who bought a large farm in 1919, building a house and the first grocery store in the town, opening also a small fabric store.

In 1930, with 45 residents, Maribondo served as a rest stop for travelers coming to the capital or going to the interior. In 1947 a new fair was established. Governor Silvestre Péricles, created the Rural School in 1948, and the first church in 1950. The BR-316 highway also gave an important boost to the development of the town, leading a group to work for autonomy. In 1962, the district was emancipated from Anadia.

== See also ==
- List of municipalities in Alagoas
