= Junqueiro =

Municipality in Alagoas, Brazil

- Municipality of Alagoas, Brazil
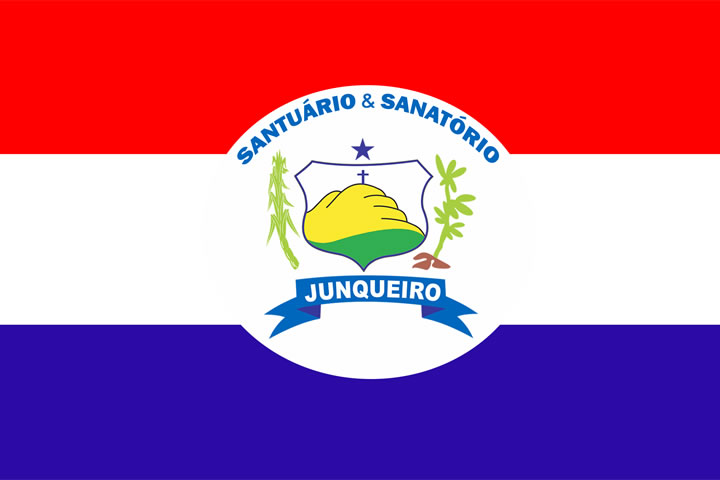
- Flag
- Etymology: Referring to the abundant presence of reeds (Portuguese: junco) on the banks of the lake
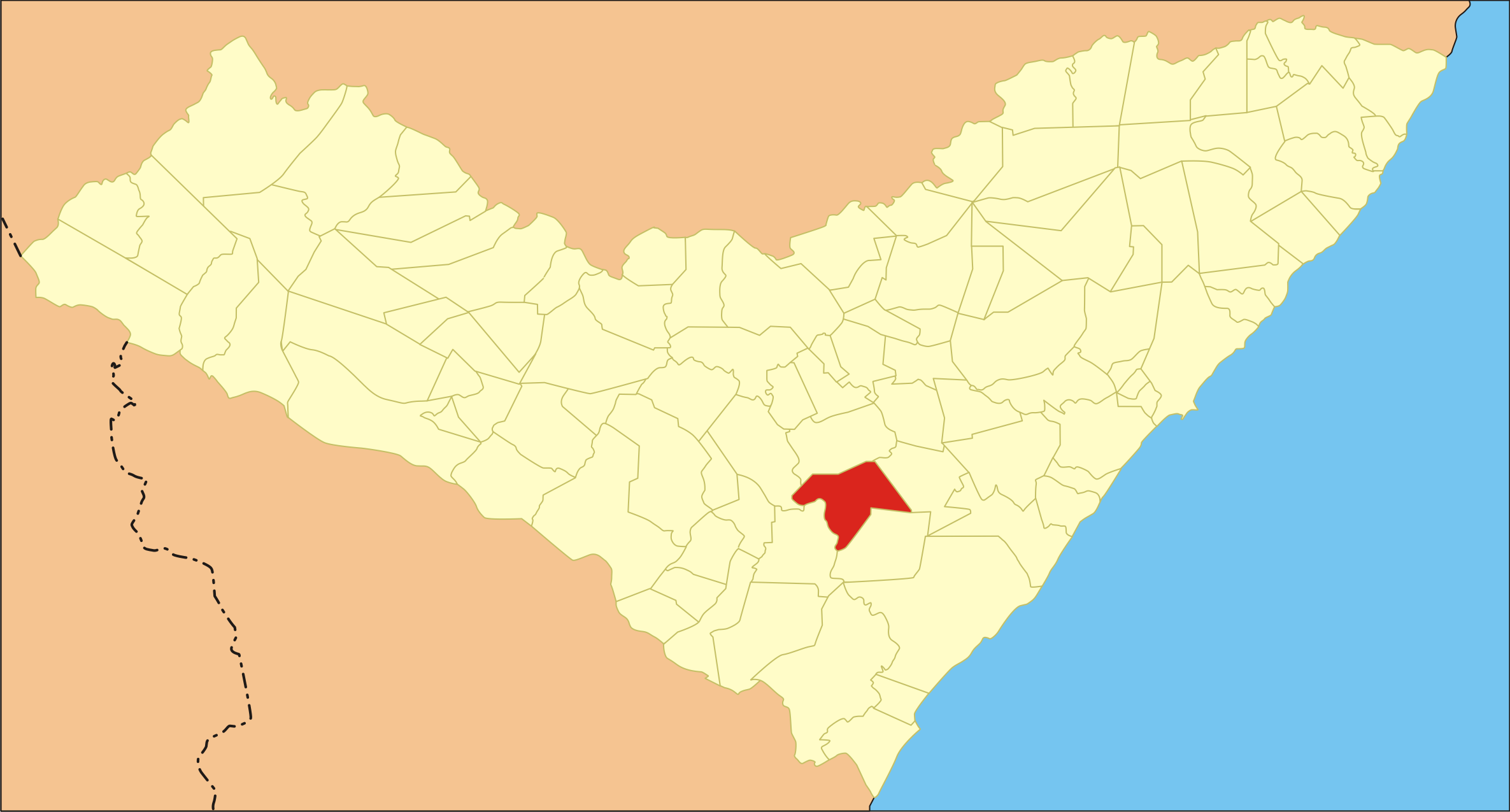
- Location of Junqueiro in Alagoas

- Location within Brazil Location within South America
- Coordinates: 9°55′30″S 36°28′33″W
- Country: Brazil
- Region: Northeast
- State: Alagoas
- Founded: 9 July 1947

Government
  - Mayor: Cicero Leandro Pereira da Silva (MDB) (2025-2028)
  - Vice Mayor: Jader Tiago da Silva (PDT) (2025-2028)

Area
  - Total: 247.724 km^{2} (95.647 sq mi)
- Elevation: 194 m (636 ft)

Population (2022)
  - Total: 23,907
  - Density: 96.51/km^{2} (250.0/sq mi)
- Demonym: Junqueirense (Brazilian Portuguese)
- Time zone: UTC-03:00 (Brasília Time)
- Postal code: 57270-000, 57271-000, 57272-000, 57274-000
- HDI (2010): 0.575 – medium
- Website: junqueiro.al.gov.br

Junqueiro (Central northeastern portuguese pronunciation: [ʒũˈkeɾu]) is a municipality located in the Brazilian state of Alagoas. Its population is 24,722 (2020) and its area is 254.07 km^{2} (98.10 sq mi).

== See also ==
- List of municipalities in Alagoas
