= TV Grande Rio =

TV Grande Rio (ZYB 304)
Petrolina, Pernambuco; Brazil
- Channels: Digital: 18 (UHF); Virtual: 19

Programming
- Affiliations: TV Globo

Ownership
- Owner: Sistema Grande Rio de Comunicação; (Rádio e Televisão Grande Rio FM Stereo Ltda.)
- Sister stations: Grande Rio FM

History
- Founded: 1990
- First air date: August 1, 1991
- Former channel numbers: Analog: 19 (UHF, 1991–2018)

Technical information
- Licensing authority: ANATEL
- ERP: 1.5 kW
- HAAT: 112 m (367 ft)
- Transmitter coordinates: 9°23′47.7″S 40°28′37.3″W

Links
- Public license information: Profile
- Website: redeglobo.globo.com/pe/tvgranderio

TV Grande Rio (channel 19) is a TV Globo-affiliated stations licensed to the city of Petrolina, in the state of Pernambuco. The station is owned by Sistema Grande Rio de Comunicação.

== History ==
In 1990, the Ministry of Communications, under the then-minister Antônio Carlos Magalhães, granted a television license to TV Grande Rio in Petrolina. The station started broadcasting on August 1, 1991. The license was granted to PTB politician Geraldo Coelho, deputy of the state of Pernambuco, who also gained the license for its FM sister station.

The station's launch was derived from the growing economical development in the São Francisco River Valley, which deserved a local television station for the delivery of local information, owing to its proximity. On launch night, it aired its first local production, the local NETV (now GRTV) before Jornal Nacional. Finding qualified journalists was impossible, because Petrolina at the time had no journalism school, instead, resorting to trained staff from Globo affiliates in other states.

In 1993, the station gained a local 5-7 minute slot during Bom Dia Pernambuco and the Saturday program Grande Rio Comunidade. The latter was replaced by Terra da Gente in 2003, produced by EPTV Campinas. In 1998, it started airing Jornal Grande Rio, which aired during the slot of the first edition of the local news service. In line with the 1999 rebranding of Praça TV, both daily news bulletins were renamed GRTV. In 2012, due to the construction of a new tower to accommodate digital broadcasts, the station moved from VHF channel 2 to UHF channel 19.

A local edition of Globo Notícia, Grande Rio Notícia, started on February 18, 2008. Its website was put under the G1 brand on November 29, 2013, under the name G1 Petrolina e Região. On January 1, 2015, TV Grande Rio changed its logo.

== Digital signal ==
Virtual channel	Digital channel	Screen	Content
19.1	18 UHF	1080i	TV Grande Rio/Globo programming

TV Grande Rio started digital broadcasts in 2014, implying the upgrade of its equipments. It wasn't until May 30, 2016 that the station finished the conversion of all of its local programs to high definition.
