= TV Globo Pernambuco =

Television station in Recife, Brazil

TV Globo Pernambuco (ZYB 302)

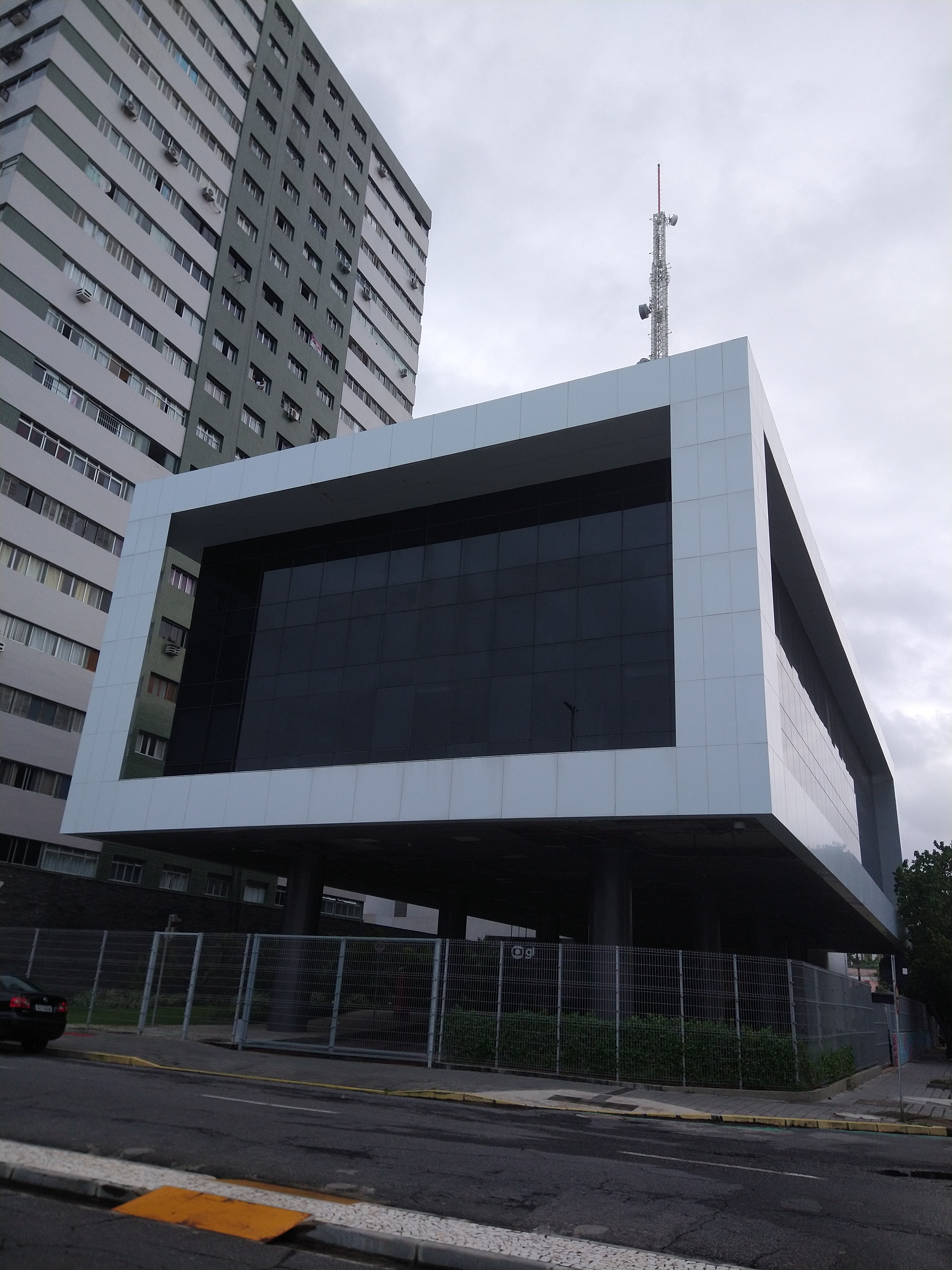
- Recife, Pernambuco; Brazil
- Channels: Digital: 36 (UHF); Virtual: 13
- Branding: Globo Pernambuco

Programming
- Affiliations: TV Globo

Ownership
- Owner: Grupo Globo; (Globo Comunicação e Participações S/A (Globo))

History
- First air date: April 22, 1972
- Former names: TV Globo Nordeste (1972-1976); Rede Globo Nordeste (1976-2021)
- Former channel numbers: Analog: 13 (VHF, 1972-2017)

Technical information
- Licensing authority: ANATEL
- ERP: 18 kW

Links
- Public license information: Profile
- Website: redeglobo.globo.com/globonordeste

TV Globo Pernambuco (channel 13) is a television station located in Recife, Pernambuco, Brazil. It is licensed to broadcast TV Globo programming and is owned-and-operated by Globo, a subsidiary of Grupo Globo. The station serves as the main broadcaster of TV Globo content in most of the state of Pernambuco. Its coverage area includes 54 municipalities, providing programming to viewers of TV Asa Branca and TV Grande Rio, as well as having a repeater in the Fernando de Noronha archipelago.

== History ==
TV Globo Recife, now known as TV Globo Pernambuco, was established after being purchased from Organizações Victor Costa. The license (channel 13) was originally granted to Rádio Relógio, whose owners in 1962 sold their assets to OVC. Roberto Marinho's original idea, however, was not setting up a station from scratch, and instead buying part of the shares of TV Jornal do Commercio, which already had an entire technical structure for a television station, but F. Pessoa de Queiroz rejected the proposal — on the other hand, TV Jornal aired TV Globo programs such as Jornal Nacional, Programa Silvio Santos and some telenovelas, alongside programs from TV Record (REI's flagship station), TV Excelsior (closed by the military dictatorship in 1970) and its local programs, from the late 1960s to the inauguration of Globo's Pernambucan affiliate. It is located in the capital city of Pernambuco, and has been operating from its headquarters in the Santo Amaro neighborhood. since 2018. As one of the five stations owned by Grupo Globo. TV Globo Pernambuco has a strong focus on regional programming. It broadcasts important local events such as Carnival, Paixão de Cristo, and São João, do Nordeste, which features renowned Northeastern musicians. The station previously aired the Copa Nordeste de Futebol, which is now broadcast by SBT.

TV Globo Pernambuco was inaugurated on April 22, 1972, within the timeframe established by DENTEL (Department of National Telecommunications) between the license grant and the start of transmissions. To celebrate this milestone, a special edition was aired the following day, broadcast live nationwide, featuring Buzina do Chacrinha (Abelardo Barbosa, alias Chacrinha, was born in Pernambuco) directly from the Geraldo Magalhães Gymnasium.

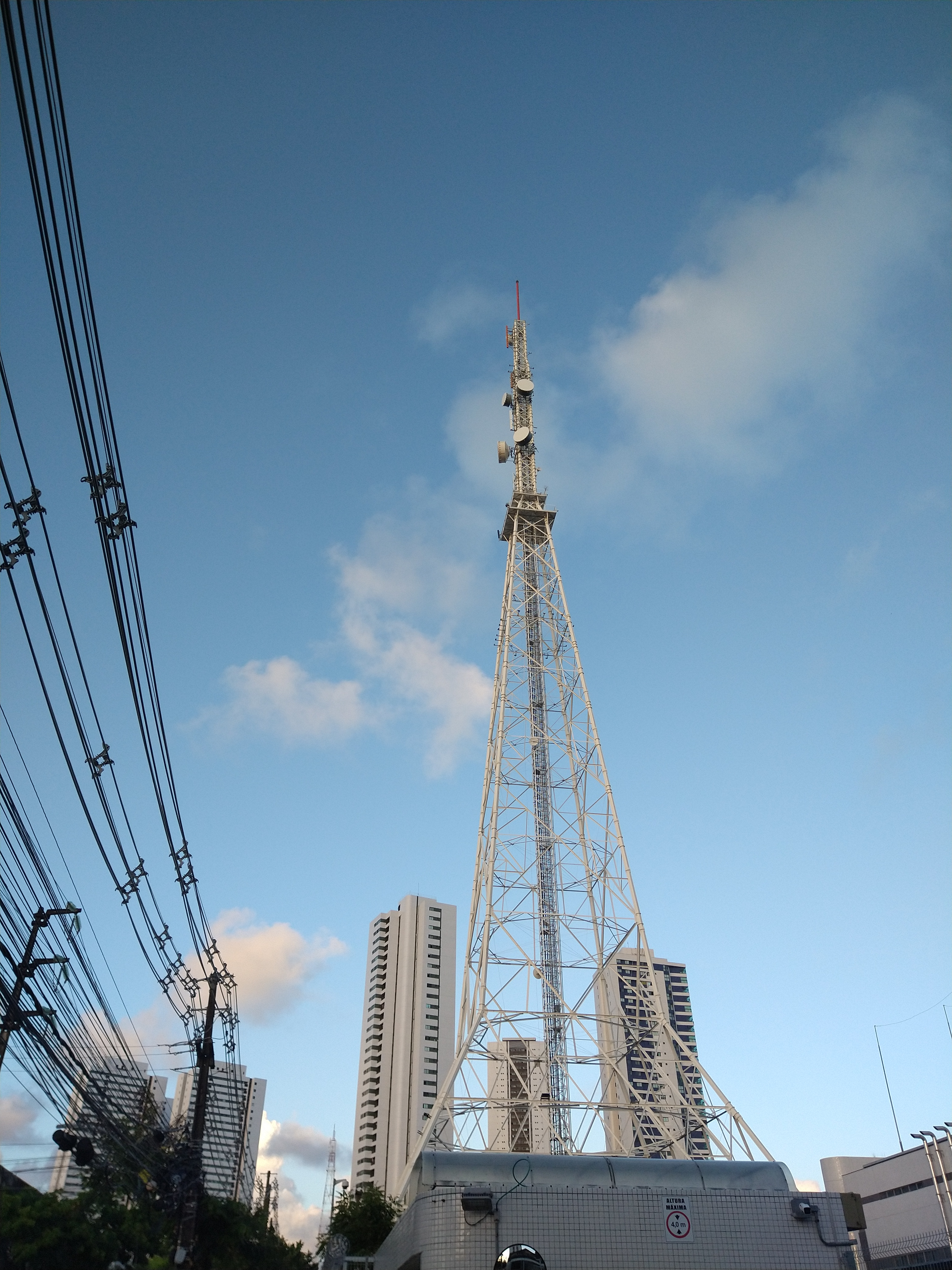
Transmission antennas of TV Globo Pernambuco in Recife, Pernambuco

Due to the rushed implementation, the station initially faced operational challenges. Having been founded on the end of the dateline established by DENTEL between the license and its sign-on, and since Roberto Marinho's initial plans had failed, it had poor signal quality, irregular in some states, and used equipment from other branches (using a 5 kW transmitter previously used by TV Globo Brasília), as well as using technical parts from other stations. The studios were located at the top of Morro do Peludo in Olinda, while the journalism department and commercial sector were based in the Ambassador Building in downtown Recife; in 1978, all operations moved to Olinda. Additionally, 80% of the network's programming arrived up to two days late, as tapes were transported by plane. However, the TV news was broadcast live, setting it apart from the delayed programming. When tapes of telenovelas arrived later, Globo Nordeste had to repeat a prior episode or put other content in an improvised manner on air.

Despite its initial precarious state, the station was a key piece — as its name suggested — in Rede Globo's expansion and integration in the Northeast region of Brazil, which at the time had affiliates in Bahia (TV Aratu), in Ceará (TV Verdes Mares) and in Maranhão (TV Difusora), airing only part of the network's programming. In 1975, there were already affiliates in all other northeastern states, with the sole exception of Paraíba and Rio Grande do Norte, which had been receiving the signal generated in Recife irregularly, as well as the interior of Pernambuco. In 1977, relayers were installed on channels 10 in João Pessoa and 13 in Natal, thus closing Rede Globo's national coverage in all the country's capitals, and in 1978, to internalize the signal in Pernambuco, the station began using relayers from the Department of Telecommunications of Pernambuco (DETELPE), reaching inland cities such as Caruaru and Petrolina, which later gained their affiliates in 1991. The station shared its antennas with TV Universitária, which broadcast its programming from the time it went on air in the morning until 4pm, when Globo's programming came on, in a scheme that continued until 1983. DETELPE's relayers were used until 1995, when the station invested in its own relays.

This aspect lasted until the second half of the 1980s, when Globo gained affiliates in João Pessoa and Natal, having its signal replaced, respectively, by TV Cabo Branco and TV Cabugi, returning its focus only for Pernambuco. In 1991, the station's coverage was reduced only to the eastern portion of the state, with the creation of TV Asa Branca and TV Grande Rio, which were responsible for the countryside and the hinterland, respectively. The position of TV Globo Nordeste as a point of integration for the region's stations was then redefined in 2000, when Rede Globo created the regional project Nordeste Integrado, a time when programs such as São João do Nordeste appeared and a considerable increase in the production of specials by the station and some affiliates in the region, broadcast on the national network on several occasions, as is still the case today.

Globo started installing a digital relay station in Fernando de Noronha in 2015, which was activated on October 24 that same year. On October 7, 2021, the station's analog relayer in Fernando de Noronha was shut down.

== Current programs ==
In addition to broadcasting TV Globo's national programming, Globo Nordeste generates the following programs:

- Bom Dia Pernambuco
- NE1
- NE2
- Globo Esporte Pernambuco
- É Pipoca
- Globo Comunidade
- Radar NE

=== Programs by Season ===
- PE Space
- Northeast Summer
- Northeast Winter
- Northeast Living and Preserving
- Stories & Tales

=== Specials and Musicals ===
- Luiz Gonzaga Especial (2007)
- Reginaldo Rossi: 40 Anos de Reinado (2007)
- Elba Ramalho: Cordas, Gonzaga e Afins (2014)
- Lucy Alves (2015)
- Chico Science: Electric Crab
- Reginaldo Rossi: My Great Love
- Sound of Earth: 40 Years
- Legends and Hauntings of Recife

=== Programs no longer aired ===
- NETV 3ª Edição
- NETV - Edição de Domingo
- Jornal das Sete
- Lançamento Final
