= Gazeta de Alagoas =

Gazeta de Alagoas is a Brazilian newspaper, published in Alagoas. It belongs to the family of Fernando Collor. This Brazilian newspaper is the leader, in sales, in the Brazilian state of Alagoas.

Its inauguration took place on February 25, 1934, at the initiative of journalist Luiz Magalhães da Silveira. At the time, Senator Arnon de Mello became a contributor to the newspaper as a correspondent in the city of Rio de Janeiro, then the federal capital. In the late 1940s, the newspaper was sold to the former Cooperativa Editora e Publicitária de Alagoas. At the time, the newspaper was practically bankrupt, with a circulation of just over 200 copies. Its modernization occurred when it became the "embryo company" of the Organizações Arnon de Mello, when he acquired it in 1952.

Gazeta was the first newspaper in Alagoas printed with state-of-the-art technologies, marking its pioneering spirit also in initiatives such as the introduction of Telex, radiophoto and telephoto systems, offset printing, the computerization of all its departments, and the fact that it was the first newspaper in the state to be accessed via the internet.

Currently, Gazeta publishes its daily editions digitally from Monday to Friday and in print on Saturdays.

== See also ==
- TV Gazeta de Alagoas
