= Adriano (footballer, born 1978) =

Brazilian football manager

Personal information
- Full name: Adriano Rodrigues da Silva
- Date of birth: 8 December 1978 (age 47)
- Place of birth: Maceió, Brazil
- Position: Defensive midfielder

Team information
- Current team: CSE (head coach)

Senior career*
Years	Team	Apps	(Gls)
- Sete de Setembro
2003	Bom Jesus		
2003–2004	ASA		
2004	CSA		
2005	Bandeirante		
2006	Bom Jesus		
2006–2009	Igaci		
2010	Penedense	15	(1)
2011	Ipanema	7	(3)

Managerial career
- 2013–2014: Sete de Setembro
- 2015: Ipanema (assistant)
- 2015: Ipanema (interim)
- 2015–2016: Sete de Setembro
- 2017: Sete de Setembro
- 2018–2019: FF Sports
- 2019: ASA U20
- 2020: CSA U20
- 2020–2022: CSA (assistant)
- 2020: CSA (interim)
- 2021: CSA (interim)
- 2021: CSA (interim)
- 2022: CSA (interim)
- 2022: CSA (interim)
- 2023: Cruzeiro de Arapiraca
- 2023: Vianópolis U20
- 2024: Cruzeiro de Arapiraca
- 2024–2025: CSA U20
- 2026–: CSE
- * Club domestic league appearances and goals

Adriano Rodrigues da Silva (born 8 December 1978), sometimes known as Adriano Cabeça or just Adriano, is a Brazilian football coach and former player who played as a defensive midfielder. He is the current head coach of CSE.

== Playing career ==
Born in Maceió, Adriano played exclusively in his native state Alagoas during his entire career. After starting his career with Sete de Setembro, he represented Bom Jesus in the Campeonato Alagoano and joined ASA in 2003, playing for the side in the year's Série C.

In 2004, Adriano joined CSA, and appeared for the club in the Campeonato Alagoano Segunda Divisão. In 2005 he moved to Bandeirante, and returned to Bom Jesus for the 2006 season.

Adriano helped Igaci to win the second division of the Alagoano in 2006, and subsequently became a regular starter for the side. He left the club in 2009 to join Penedense for the ensuing campaign, and played for Ipanema in 2011 before retiring.

== Managerial career ==
After retiring, Adriano first worked as a manager at former side Sete de Setembro, leading the club in the campaigns of 2013 and 2014, in the second division. In 2015, he worked as an assistant manager of another former team, Ipanema, being also an interim manager. He subsequently returned to Sete, and helped the side to achieve promotion to the first division as champions.

Adriano resigned from Sete on 8 March 2016, but returned to the role for the 2017 campaign. In 2018, he was in charge of FF Sports Portocalvense before moving to ASA to work as their under-20 manager on 3 October 2019.

In November 2019, Adriano agreed to a deal with CSA to work as their under-20 manager in the ensuing campaign. He subsequently became an assistant manager of the main squad, and was an interim manager for a Série B match against Cruzeiro in September 2020, after the dismissal of Argel Fucks.

In April 2021, after manager Mozart left for Chapecoense, Adriano was named interim manager. He was also an interim on two occasions in 2022, after Alberto Valentim and Roberto Fernandes left.

On 14 November 2022, despite the club's relegation, Adriano was permanently named manager of CSA for the upcoming season. On 4 December, however, the club's new board announced his departure.

== Honours ==
=== Player ===
Igaci

- Campeonato Alagoano Segunda Divisão: 2006

=== Manager ===
Sete de Setembro

- Campeonato Alagoano Segunda Divisão: 2015
