= 2014 Campeonato Alagoano =

Campeonato Alagoano de Futebol
- Season: 2014
- Champions: Coruripe
- Relegated: Penedense; Comercial-AL
- Copa do Brasil: CRB; Coruripe; Murici
- Série D: Coruripe
- Copa do Nordeste: CRB; Coruripe
- Matches: 86
- Goals: 210 (2.44 per match)
- Top goalscorer: Lima (ASA) - 13 goals

The 2014 Campeonato Alagoano de Futebol was the 84th season of Alagoas's top professional football league. The competition began on January 12 and ended on April 30. Coruripe were the champions for the 3rd time. Penedense and Comercial-AL were relegated.

== Format ==
In the first stage, 8 teams play in a double round-robin format. The best four teams face each other in the playoffs, and the winner qualified for the 2015 Copa do Brasil.

On the second stage, the 8 teams are joined by CRB and CSA which were playing on 2014 Copa do Nordeste. The two best teams qualify to the 2015 Copa do Brasil and 2015 Copa do Nordeste, and the best team qualifies to the 2014 Campeonato Brasileiro Série D. The 10 teams are split in two groups, with the two best from each group facing on the final stage.

== Participating teams ==
Club	Home city	2012 result
ASA	Arapiraca	4th
C.E.O	Olho d'Água das Flores	5th
Comercial	Viçosa	6th
Coruripe	Coruripe	2nd (2nd division)
CRB	Maceió	1st
CSA	Maceió	2nd
CSE	Palmeira dos Índios	7th
Murici	Murici	3rd
Penedense	Penedo	3rd (2nd division)
Santa Rita	Boca da Mata	1st (2nd division)

Corinthians Alagoano merged with Santa Rita for this season. Thus the 3rd place of 2nd division, Penedense, was promoted.

== First round (Copa Alagoas) ==
Pos	Team	Pld	W	D	L	GF	GA	GD	Pts	Qualification
1	ASA (A)	7	5	1	1	14	8	+6	16	Advances to the next stage
2	Santa Rita (A)	7	4	3	0	11	5	+6	15	Advances to the next stage
3	Coruripe (A)	7	2	3	2	12	10	+2	9	Advances to the next stage
4	Murici (A)	7	2	3	2	8	8	0	9	Advances to the next stage
5	CSE	7	2	2	3	13	13	0	8	
6	Penedense	7	2	2	3	6	9	−3	8	
7	CEO	7	1	3	3	4	9	−5	6	
8	Comercial-AL	7	1	1	5	5	11	−6	4	

Rules for classification: 1) points; 2) goal difference; 3) number of goals scored.
(A) Advance to a further round

=== Results ===
Home \ Away	ASA	CEO	COM	COR	CSE	MUR	PEN	SRA
ASA		0–0			3–2		3–0	
CEO			0–0			0–1	2–0	
Comercial-AL	1–2			0–2	2–3			1–3
Coruripe	1–2	4–0			1–4			
CSE		2–2				1–2	0–2	1–1
Murici	2–3		0–1	1–1				2–2
Penedense			1–0	3–3		0–0		
Santa Rita	2–1	2–0		0–0			1–0	

Legend: Blue = home team win; Yellow = draw; Red = away team win.

=== Final stage ===
Semifinals
1	ASA	1	1	2
4	Murici	3	0	3
2	Santa Rita	1	3	4
3	Coruripe	2	1	3

Finals
4	Murici	1	1	2
2	Santa Rita	0	0	0

==== Semifinals ====
===== First leg =====
February 05, 2014
18:15 UTC−03:00

Murici	3–1	ASA

Estádio José Gomes da Costa, Murici

February 06, 2014
20:30 UTC−03:00

Coruripe	2–1	Santa Rita

Estádio Gerson Amaral, Coruripe

===== Second leg =====
February 08, 2014
17:30 UTC−03:00

ASA	1–0	Murici

Estádio Municipal Coaracy da Mata Fonseca, Arapiraca

February 09, 2014
15:15 UTC−03:00

Santa Rita	3–1	Coruripe

Estádio Olival Elias de Moraes, Boca da Mata

==== Final ====
February 13, 2014
20:30 UTC−03:00

Murici	1–0	Santa Rita
Júnior Amorim 5'

Estádio José Gomes da Costa, Murici
Referee: Francisco Carlos do Nascimento

February 15, 2014
14:45 UTC−03:00

Santa Rita	0–1	Murici
		90' Júnior Amorim

Estádio Olival Elias de Moraes, Boca da Mata
Referee: José Reinaldo Figueiredo

== Second round (Copa Maceió) ==
=== Group A ===
Pos	Team	Pld	W	D	L	GF	GA	GD	Pts	Qualification
1	CRB (A)	10	6	3	1	15	5	+10	21	Advances to the next stage
2	ASA (A)	10	6	1	3	19	13	+6	19	Advances to the next stage
3	CSE	10	6	0	4	15	14	+1	18	
4	Santa Rita	10	2	5	3	11	15	−4	11	
5	Comercial-AL	10	1	4	5	9	19	−10	7	

Rules for classification: 1) points; 2) goal difference; 3) number of goals scored.
(A) Advance to a further round

=== Group B ===
Pos	Team	Pld	W	D	L	GF	GA	GD	Pts	Qualification
1	Coruripe (A)	10	5	2	3	15	10	+5	17	Advances to the next stage
2	Murici (A)	10	4	2	4	12	11	+1	14	Advances to the next stage
3	CSA	10	3	3	4	17	13	+4	12	
4	CEO	10	2	3	5	9	15	−6	9	
5	Penedense	10	2	3	5	13	20	−7	9	

Rules for classification: 1) points; 2) goal difference; 3) number of goals scored.
(A) Advance to a further round

=== Results ===
Home \ Away	ASA	COM	CRB	CSE	SRA	CEO	COR	CSA	MUR	PEN
ASA						3–2	2–1	3–2	0–1	4–3
Comercial-AL						0–3	1–3	0–2	2–2	2–1
CRB						1–0	0–1	1–0	2–0	3–0
CSE						4–0	1–3	2–0	1–0	4–1
Santa Rita						1–1	0–0	0–0	1–4	1–2
CEO	0–0	1–1	0–3	1–0	1–2					
Coruripe	0–2	2–1	1–1	0–1	4–1					
CSA	0–3	3–0	1–1	7–1	2–2					
Murici	2–1	1–1	0–1	2–0	0–2					
Penedense	2–1	1–1	2–2	0–1	1–1					

Legend: Blue = home team win; Yellow = draw; Red = away team win.

=== Final stage ===
Semifinals
1	CRB	2	0	2
2	ASA	0	2	2
1	Coruripe	0	1	1
2	Murici	0	0	0

Finals
CRB	1	0	1
Coruripe	2	0	2

==== Semifinals ====
===== First leg =====
April 16, 2014
20:30 UTC−03:00

ASA	0–2	CRB
		Diego Rosa 37'; João Victor 73'

Estádio Municipal Coaracy da Mata Fonseca, Arapiraca
Attendance: 4,010
Referee: Flávio Feijó de Omena

April 16, 2014
20:30 UTC−03:00

Murici	0–0	Coruripe

Estádio José Gomes da Costa, Murici
Attendance: 404
Referee: Francisco Carlos Nascimento

===== Second leg =====
April 19, 2014
16:00 UTC−03:00

Coruripe	1–0	Murici
Etinho 88'

Estádio Gerson Amaral, Coruripe
Attendance: 1,242
Referee: Charles Herbert

April 20, 2014
16:00 UTC−03:00

CRB	0–2	ASA
		Didira 40'; Rafael Gava 88'

Estádio Rei Pelé, Maceió
Attendance: 5,944
Referee: José Reinaldo Figueiredo

==== Final ====
April 26, 2014

Coruripe	2–1	CRB
Aurélio 32'; Jailton 81'		Diego Rosa 33'

Estádio Gerson Amaral, Coruripe
Attendance: 2,543
Referee: José Reinaldo Figueiredo

April 30, 2014
20:00 UTC−03:00

CRB	0–0	Coruripe

Estádio Rei Pelé, Maceió
Attendance: 17,381
Referee: Francisco Carlos do Nascimento

=== Second round final standings ===
Pos	Team	Pld	W	D	L	GF	GA	GD	Pts	Qualification or relegation
1	CRB (A)	12	7	3	2	17	7	+10	24	Qualified for Copa do Brasil and Copa do Nordeste
2	Coruripe (A)	12	6	3	3	16	10	+6	21	Qualified for Série D, Copa do Brasil and Copa do Nordeste
3	ASA	12	7	1	4	21	15	+6	22	
4	Murici (A)	12	4	3	5	12	12	0	15	Qualified for Copa do Brasil
5	CSE	10	6	0	4	15	14	+1	18	
6	CSA	10	3	3	4	17	13	+4	12	
7	Santa Rita	10	2	5	3	11	15	−4	11	
8	CEO	10	2	3	5	9	15	−6	9	
9	Penedense (R)	10	2	3	5	13	20	−7	9	Relegated
10	Comercial-AL (R)	10	1	4	5	9	19	−10	7	Relegated

Rules for classification: 1) points; 2) goal difference; 3) number of goals scored.
(A) Advance to a further round; (R) Relegated

== Top goalscorers ==
Rank	Player	Club	Goals
1	Lima	ASA	13
2	Zé Paulo	CSE	11
3	Wanderson	ASA	10
4	Etinho	Coruripe	9
5	Alexsandro	Murici	7
6	Jota	Coruripe	6
7	Didira	ASA	5
7	Tozim	CRB	5
7	Didira	Santa Rita	5
8	Aurélio	Coruripe	4
8	Denílson	CRB	4
8	Marcos Bala	Penedense	4
8	Rony	Penedense	4
