= 2021 Campeonato Alagoano =

Campeonato Alagoano
- Season: 2021
- Dates: 20 February – 22 May
- Champions: CSA (40th title)
- Relegated: CEO; Coruripe
- 2022 Copa do Brasil: ASA; CRB; CSA
- 2022 Série D: CSE
- 2022 Copa do Nordeste: CSA
- 2022 Copa do Nordeste qualification: CRB; ASA (via RNC)
- Matches played: 46
- Goals scored: 107 (2.33 per match)
- Top goalscorer: Bruno Mota (9 goals)

The 2021 Campeonato Alagoano (officially the Campeonato Alagoano Smile 2021 for sponsorship reasons) was the 91st edition of the top football league in Alagoas. It began on 20 February and ended on 22 May 2021.

The finals were played behind closed doors between CSA and CRB at the Estádio Rei Pelé in Maceió on 15 and 22 May 2021. Tied 1–1 on aggregate, CSA won on penalties securing their 40th title.

== First phase ==
The top four teams advanced to the semi-finals while the bottom two teams were relegated to Campeonato Alagoano Sub 23–Segunda Divisão 2022.

Pos	Team	Pld	W	D	L	GF	GA	GD	Pts	Qualification or relegation
1	CRB	8	5	1	2	14	7	+7	16	Advance to Semi-finals
2	CSA	8	4	3	1	17	5	+12	15	Advance to Semi-finals
3	CSE	8	4	3	1	13	7	+6	15	Advance to Semi-finals
4	Aliança	8	4	1	3	7	5	+2	13	Advance to Semi-finals
5	ASA	8	3	4	1	11	5	+6	13	
6	Murici	8	3	2	3	4	5	−1	11	
7	Jaciobá	8	2	3	3	9	13	−4	9	
8	Coruripe (R)	8	1	1	6	8	23	−15	4	Relegated to Campeonato Alagoano Sub 23–Segunda Divisão
9	CEO (R)	8	0	2	6	2	15	−13	2	Relegated to Campeonato Alagoano Sub 23–Segunda Divisão

Source: FAF
Rules for classification: 1) Points; 2) Wins; 3) Goal difference; 4) Goals scored; 5) Head-to-head result (only between 2 teams); 6) Fewest red cards; 7) Fewest yellow cards; 8) Draw.
(R) Relegated

== Knockout phase ==
=== Semi-finals ===
Team 1	Agg.	Team 2	1st leg	2nd leg
Aliança	1–3	CRB	0–1	1–2
CSE	1–4	CSA	1–1	0–3

9 May 2021
16:00

Aliança	0–1	CRB
	Report	Frazan 45+1'

Estádio Universitário/UFAL, Maceió
Attendance: 0
Referee: Jonata de Souza Gouveia

12 May 2021
20:00

CRB	2–1	Aliança
Lucão 45+3' (pen.); Hyuri 83'	Report	Jonathan 6'

Estádio Rei Pelé, Maceió
Attendance: 0
Referee: Francisco Carlos do Nascimento

CRB qualified for 2022 Copa do Brasil

8 May 2021
17:00

CSE	1–1	CSA
Jan Pieter 45+3'	Report	Iury 90+3'

Estádio Juca Sampaio, Palmeira dos Índios
Attendance: 0
Referee: Rafael Carlos Salgueiro Lima

11 May 2021
20:00

CSA	3–0	CSE
Bruno Mota 12', 54'; Dellatorre 62'	Report

Estádio Rei Pelé, Maceió
Attendance: 0
Referee: Denis da Silva Ribeiro Serafim

CSA qualified for 2022 Copa do Brasil

=== 3rd place final ===
16 May 2021
16:00

Aliança	1–1	CSE
Edmar 5'	Report	Dakson 10'

Estádio Universitário/UFAL, Maceió
Attendance: 0
Referee: José Ailton da Silva

19 May 2021
16:00

CSE	2–1	Aliança
Alan James 4'; Renato 34'	Report	Luciano 22'

Estádio Juca Sampaio, Palmeira dos Índios
Attendance: 0
Referee: Márcio dos Santos Oliveira

=== Finals ===
15 May 2021
17:00

CSA	0–0	CRB
	Report

Estádio Rei Pelé, Maceió
Attendance: 0
Referee: Rafael Carlos Salgueiro Lima

22 May 2021
16:45

CRB	1–1	CSA
Hyuri 47'	Report	Bruno Mota 26'
Penalties
Lucão (penalty scored); Jean Patrick (penalty missed); Jiménez (penalty missed); Guilherme Romão (penalty scored); Torres (penalty scored)	3–4	(penalty scored) Rodrigo Pimpão; (penalty missed) Matheus Felipe; (penalty scored) Gabriel; (penalty scored) Gabriel Tonini; (penalty scored) Silvinho

Estádio Rei Pelé, Maceió
Attendance: 0
Referee: Denis da Silva Ribeiro Serafim

CSA qualified for 2022 Copa do Nordeste

== 2022 Copa do Brasil play-off ==
2021 Campeonato Alagoano third place CSE and 2021 Copa Alagoas champions ASA played a two-legged play-off to determine the third team qualified for the 2022 Copa do Brasil. If tied on aggregate, the penalty shoot-out would be used to determine the winners.

=== Matches ===
23 May 2021
16:00

CSE	2–1	ASA
Alan James 45'; Cristiano 59'	Report	Johnnattan 9'

Estádio Juca Sampaio, Palmeira dos Índios
Attendance: 0
Referee: José Ricardo Vasconcellos Laranjeira

26 May 2021
16:00

ASA	2–1	CSE
Daivison 26'; Jonas 83'	Report	Dakson 55'
Penalties
Johnnattan (penalty scored); Dinda (penalty missed); Marcelo Amaral (penalty scored); Carlos Magno (penalty scored); Caíque Baiano (penalty scored); Fernandinho (penalty scored); Jonas (penalty scored)	6–5	(penalty missed) Renato; (penalty scored) Jackson; (penalty scored) Everlan; (penalty scored) Cristiano; (penalty scored) Alan James; (penalty scored) Jan Pieter; (penalty missed) Cleiton

Estádio Municipal Coaracy da Mata Fonseca, Arapiraca
Attendance: 0
Referee: Jonata de Souza Gouveia

ASA qualified for 2022 Copa do Brasil

== General table ==
Pos	Team	Pld	W	D	L	GF	GA	GD	Pts	Qualification or relegation
1	CSA	12	5	6	1	22	7	+15	21	Champions and 2022 Copa do Brasil
2	CRB	12	7	3	2	18	9	+9	24	Runners-up and 2022 Copa do Brasil
3	CSE	14	6	5	3	20	16	+4	23	2022 Série D
4	Aliança	12	4	2	6	10	11	−1	14	
5	ASA	10	4	4	2	14	8	+6	16	2022 Copa do Brasil
6	Murici	8	3	2	3	4	5	−1	11	
7	Jaciobá	8	2	3	3	9	13	−4	9	
8	Coruripe	8	1	1	6	8	23	−15	4	Relegation to the 2022 Campeonato Alagoano Sub 23–Segunda Divisão
9	CEO	8	0	2	6	2	15	−13	2	Relegation to the 2022 Campeonato Alagoano Sub 23–Segunda Divisão

Source: FAF
Rules for classification: 1) Points; 2) Wins; 3) Goal difference; 4) Goals scored; 5) Head-to-head result (only between 2 teams); 6) Fewest red cards; 7) Fewest yellow cards; 8) Draw.

== Top goalscorers ==
Rank	Player	Team	Goals
1	Bruno Mota	CSA	9
2	Alan James	CSE	7
3	Daivison	ASA	4
3	Dellatorre	CSA	4
3	Filipe André	Aliança	4
3	Hyuri	CRB	4
3	Lucão	CRB	4
