= Fuscão (footballer) =

Brazilian footballer

Personal information
- Full name: Claudivan Oliveira da Silva
- Date of birth: 12 January 1978 (age 48)
- Place of birth: Arapiraca, Brazil
- Position: Forward

Youth career
- ASA

Senior career*
| Years | Team | Apps | (Gls) |
| 2000–2002 | ASA | | |
| 2000 | → Penedense (loan) | | |
| 2001 | → Igaci (loan) | | |
| 2002 | Confiança | | |
| 2003 | CSE | | |
| 2003 | CSA | | |
| 2003–2005 | Coruripe | | |
| 2005 | Ipanema | | |
| 2006 | Coruripe | | |
| 2006 | Universal | | |
| 2007 | Ipanema | | |
| 2008 | ASA | | |
| 2008 | CSE | | |
| 2009 | Capelense | | |
| 2009 | Ipanema | | |
- * Club domestic league appearances and goals as of 2 December 2023

Claudivan Oliveira da Silva (born 12 January 1978), better known as Fuscão, is a Brazilian former professional footballer who played as a forward.

== Career ==
Two-time champion of the Alagoas championship with ASA in 2000 and 2001, Fuscão was part of the squad that achieved historic classification against Palmeiras in the 2002 Copa do Brasil. Still in 2002, he transferred to Confiança, becoming state champion again. He played for several other clubs in the state of Alagoas.

== Honours ==
ASA

- Campeonato Alagoano: 2000, 2001

Confiança

- Campeonato Sergipano: 2002

Coruripe

- Campeonato Alagoano: 2006
