= Roberval Davino =

Brazilian football manager (born 1954)

Personal information
- Full name: Roberval Davino da Silva
- Date of birth: 12 August 1954 (age 72)
- Place of birth: Maceió, Brazil
- Height: 1.82 m (6 ft 0 in)
- Position: Midfielder

Team information
- Current team: Paulista (head coach)

Senior career*
Years	Team	Apps	(Gls)
1969–1978	CRB		
1978–1980	XV de Jaú		
1980	Araçatuba		
1980–1981	CRB		
1982	Capelense		
1983–1988	CRB		
1992	IEC		

Managerial career
- 1984–1985: CRB
- 1985–1986: Seleção Alagoana
- 1986–1987: CSA
- 1987–1988: São Domingos
- 1988–1989: IEC
- 1989–1991: Novo Horizonte
- 1991–1992: Juventude
- 1992: XV de Jaú
- 1993: Goiânia
- 1993: Goiás
- 1993: Vila Nova
- 1993–1994: Araçatuba
- 1994–1995: Anápolis
- 1995: Atlético Goianiense
- 1995: Botafogo-SP
- 1995: CSA
- 1995: Lousano Paulista
- 1996: CSA
- 1996–1997: Vila Nova
- 1997: CRB
- 1997–1998: Mogi Mirim
- 1998: Mirassol
- 1998: Matonense
- 1998: Araçatuba
- 1998–1999: Mirassol
- 1999: Sampaio Corrêa
- 1999: Mirassol
- 1999: Juventude
- 2000: São Caetano
- 2000: Inter de Limeira
- 2000: Juventude
- 2001: União Barbarense
- 2001: CRB
- 2001: Figueirense
- 2002: Mogi Mirim
- 2002: Marília
- 2003: América-SP
- 2003: Gama
- 2003: América-SP
- 2004: Mirassol
- 2004: Santa Cruz
- 2004: América-SP
- 2004–2005: Marília
- 2005: Remo
- 2005: América-SP
- 2006: América de Natal
- 2006: Fortaleza
- 2006: ABC
- 2007: Santo André
- 2007: Bragantino
- 2007: Ituano
- 2007: Guarani
- 2007–2008: CRB
- 2008: Mirassol
- 2008–2009: Linense
- 2009: Brasiliense
- 2009: Metropolitano
- 2009–2010: Guaratinguetá
- 2010: Brasiliense
- 2010: Mogi Mirim
- 2010: Corinthians Alagoano
- 2011: Catanduvense
- 2011–2012: Paysandu
- 2012: CRB
- 2013: Luverdense
- 2013–2014: CRB
- 2015: Paulista
- 2016: Sergipe
- 2017: Murici
- 2018–2019: Capivariano
- 2019–2020: Comercial-SP
- 2020: Tupi
- 2022: Monte Azul
- 2022: Paulista
- 2023: Comercial-SP
- 2023–: Paulista
- * Club domestic league appearances and goals

Roberval Davino da Silva (born 12 August 1954) is a Brazilian football coach and former player who played as a midfielder. He is the current head coach of Paulista.

== Playing career ==
Born in Maceió, Alagoas, Davino began his professional career with CRB in 1969. He later played for XV de Jaú, Araçatuba, Capelense and Japanese IEC FC, where he finished his career in 1992.

== Coaching career ==
While still a player, Davino started a coaching of the CRB in 1984. In the years 1985-1986 he also worked in the Federação Alagoana de Futebol with the Seleção Alagoana. In 1986-1987 he trained CSA and in 1987-1988 club São Domingos. From 1988 to 1992 with break he led Japanese IEC FC.

Since 1989 he coached the clubs: Novo Horizonte, Juventude, XV de Jaú, Goiânia, Goiás, Vila Nova, Araçatuba, Anápolis, Atlético-GO, Botafogo-SP, Lousano Paulista, Mogi Mirim, Mirassol, Matonense, Sampaio Corrêa, São Caetano, Inter de Limeira, União Barbarense, Figueirense, Marília, América-SP, Gama, Santa Cruz, Remo, América de Natal, Fortaleza, ABC, Santo André, Bragantino, Ituano, Guarani, Linense, Brasiliense, Metropolitano, Guaratinguetá, Corinthians-AL, Catanduvense, Paysandu, Luverdense and Sergipe.

== Honours ==
=== Player ===
CRB

- Campeonato Alagoano: 1972, 1973, 1976, 1977, 1978, 1983
- Copa do Nordeste: 1975

=== Manager ===
IEC

- Kumamoto Division 3: 1989
- Kumamoto Division 2: 1990
- Kumamoto Division 1: 1991

Vila Nova

- Campeonato Brasileiro Série C: 1996
- Campeonato Goiano: 1993

Remo

- Campeonato Brasileiro Série C: 2005

Araçatuba

- Campeonato Paulista Série A2: 1992

CSA

- Campeonato Alagoano: 1996, 1997

Figueirense

- Campeonato Catarinense: 2002

Brasiliense

- Campeonato Brasiliense: 2009

Metropolitano

- Copa Santa Catarina: 2009
