= Copa Alagoas =

Football tournament in Brazil organized by Federação Alagoana de Futebol

- Founded: 2005
- Region: Alagoas
- Teams: 8 (2021)
- Current champions: CSA (2nd title) (2024)
- Most championships: ASA (3 titles)
- Website: Federação Alagoana de Futebol

The Copa Alagoas is a tournament organized by Federação Alagoana de Futebol every second half of the season. The champions qualify for the Campeonato Brasileiro Série D.

== History ==
Founded in 2005 as the second phase of the Campeonato Alagoano, the Copa Alagoas was a part of the tournament in the 2005, 2006 and 2007 editions. After the tournament's change of format, the competition was not disputed until 2014 and 2015, when it became again a part of the Alagoano, but now the first phase.

From the 2016 to the 2019 campaigns, Copa Alagoas was not disputed. The competition returned to an active status in 2020, being now an independent tournament and assuring a place in the Campeonato Brasileiro Série D to the champion.

== List of champions ==
As a part of the Campeonato Alagoano

Season	Winner	Runner-up
2005	Coruripe	ASA
2006	CSA	Corinthians Alagoano
2007	Coruripe	Corinthians Alagoano
2008–2013	Not disputed
2014	Murici	Santa Rita
2015	ASA	CSA

=== As a separated tournament ===
Season	Winner	Runner-up
2020	ASA	CEO
2021	ASA	Coruripe
2022	Cruzeiro de Arapiraca	Aliança
2023	CSE	ASA
2024	CSA	Penedense
2025	CSE	Penedense
2026	CSA	ASA

== Titles by team ==
Club	Wins	Winning years
ASA	3	2015, 2020, 2021
Coruripe	2	2005, 2007
CSA	3	2006, 2024, 2026
Murici	1	2014
CSE	2	2023, 2025
Cruzeiro de Arapiraca	1	2022
