= Reinaldo Alagoano =

Brazilian footballer

Personal information
- Full name: Reinaldo Gonçalves Félix
- Date of birth: April 13, 1986 (age 40)
- Place of birth: Arapiraca, Brazil
- Height: 1.77 m (5 ft 10 in)
- Position: Striker

Youth career
- –2004: Corinthians Alagoano

Senior career*
Years	Team	Apps	(Gls)
2005–2007	Corinthians Alagoano		
2007	→ CRB (loan)	17	(3)
2008–2012	Cruzeiro	3	(0)
2009	→ Bahia (loan)	13	(3)
2009	→ Huesca (loan)	9	(1)
2010	→ Vegalta Sendai (loan)	3	(0)
2011	→ Mirassol (loan)	0	(0)
2011	→ Boa (loan)	3	(0)
2011	→ ASA (loan)	25	(5)
2012	→ Nacional-MG (loan)	6	(0)
2013	CRB	13	(5)
2013–2014	Santa Rita	0	(0)
2015	CSA	0	(0)
2015	Central-PE	10	(3)
2016	Votuporanguense	0	(0)
2016	ASA	17	(9)
2017	Uberlândia	0	(0)
2017	Campinense	8	(4)
2018	Treze	0	(0)
2019	Fluminense de Feira	0	(0)
2019	Altos	3	(0)
2019	Zumbi	0	(0)
2020	ASA	5	(0)
2020	Campinense	7	(0)
2021	Murici	7	(0)
2021	Zumbi	8	(4)
- * Club domestic league appearances and goals as of 20:07, 4 February 2024 (UTC)

Reinaldo Gonçalves Félix (born April 13, 1986, in Arapiraca), known as Reinaldo Alagoano, is a Brazilian professional football player.
