= Deysinho =

Brazilian footballer (born 1991)

Personal information
- Full name: Andrey Soares Almeida
- Date of birth: 5 December 1991 (age 34)
- Place of birth: Brazil
- Height: 1.66 m (5 ft 5 in)
- Position: Midfielder

Team information
- Current team: Fluminense de Feira

Youth career
- CEO

Senior career*
Years	Team	Apps	(Gls)
2011	Santa Rita		
2012	Pesqueira	0	(0)
2012	CEO		
2013	América		
2013	Pesqueira	0	(0)
2014	Central	0	(0)
2014	Coruripe	4	(0)
2014–2015	América	0	(0)
2015	CEO	0	(0)
2015	Olinda		
2016–2017	Murici	8	(0)
2017	Dimensão Saúde		
2018	Fluminense de Feira	7	(4)
2018	Imperatriz		
2019–	Fluminense de Feira	2	(1)
- * Club domestic league appearances and goals as of 16:31, 28 March 2019 (UTC)

Andrey Soares Almeida (born 15 December 1991), commonly known as Deysinho or Delsinho, is a Brazilian footballer who currently plays as a forward for Campeonato Brasileiro Série D side Sergipe.

== Career ==
Deysinho began his football career playing in the Campeonato Pernambucano with Pesqueira (Serie A1), América-PE (Serie A2) and Central-PE (Serie A1). In 2014, he scored a Hat-trick for Central-PE in a 5–0 victory over Ypiranga-PE.

== Career statistics ==
=== Club ===
As of 28 March 2019.

Club	Season	League			State League		Cup		Other		Total	
Club	Season	Division	Apps	Goals	Apps	Goals	Apps	Goals	Apps	Goals	Apps	Goals
Pesqueira	2012	–			3 (Note: Appearances in the Pernambucano A2)	0	0	0	0	0	3	0
Pesqueira	2013	–			21 (Note: Appearances in the Campeonato Pernambucano)	2	0	0	0	0	21	2
Pesqueira	Total		0	0	24	2	0	0	0	0	24	2
Central	2014	Série D	0	0	8	3	0	0	0	0	8	3
Coruripe	2014	Série D	4	0	0	0	0	0	0	0	4	0
América	2015	–			23	6	0	0	0	0	23	6
CEO	2015	–			8 (Note: Appearances in the Campeonato Alagoano)	1	0	0	0	0	8	1
Murici	2016	Série D	4	0	16	2	0	0	0	0	20	2
Murici	2017	Série D	4	0	19	3	4 (Note: Appearances in the Copa do Brasil)	1	0	0	27	4
Murici	Total		8	0	35	5	4	1	0	0	43	5
Fluminense de Feira	2018	Série D	7	4	9 (Note: Appearances in the Campeonato Baiano)	2	2	0	0	0	18	6
Fluminense de Feira	2019	Série D	2	1	5	1	0	0	0	0	7	2
Fluminense de Feira	Total		9	5	14	3	2	0	0	0	25	8
Career total			21	5	112	20	6	1	0	0	139	26
