= Lucas Kallyel =

Brazilian footballer (born 2004)

Personal information
- Full name: Lucas Kallyel da Silva Ramalho
- Date of birth: 1 March 2004 (age 22)
- Place of birth: Maceió, Brazil
- Height: 1.71 m (5 ft 7 in)
- Position: Midfielder

Team information
- Current team: CRB
- Number: 5

Youth career
- 2018–2019: Atlético Mineiro
- 2020–2023: Retrô
- 2021–2022: → Fortaleza (loan)
- 2023–2024: CRB

Senior career*
Years	Team	Apps	(Gls)
2023	CRB B	8	(0)
2023–	CRB	27	(0)
- * Club domestic league appearances and goals as of 16 December 2025

Lucas Kallyel da Silva Ramalho (born 1 March 2004), known as Lucas Kallyel, is a Brazilian professional footballer who plays as a midfielder for CRB.

== Career ==
Born in Maceió, Alagoas, Lucas Kallyel played for the youth sides of Atlético Mineiro and Retrô before joining Fortaleza in 2021. He was promoted to the latter's under-20 team in January 2022, but left the club at the end of the year.

In 2023, after playing in the Copa São Paulo de Futebol Júnior for Retrô, Lucas Kallyel joined CRB, initially for the under-20 team. He made his senior debut on 26 February 2023, starting in a 2–1 Campeonato Alagoano away win over Murici, as the club lined up mainly youth players. In that year, he also played for the B-team in the Campeonato Alagoano Second Division.

On 19 July 2024, after establishing himself as a first team member, Lucas Kallyel renewed his contract with CRB until December 2028.

== Career statistics ==
As of 29 May 2025

Appearances and goals by club, season and competition
Club	Season	League			State league		National cup		Continental		Other		Total	
Club	Season	Division	Apps	Goals	Apps	Goals	Apps	Goals	Apps	Goals	Apps	Goals	Apps	Goals
CRB B	2023	Alagoano 2ª Divisão	—		8	0	—		—		—		8	0
CRB	2023	Série B	0	0	1	0	0	0	—		5 (Note: Appearance(s) in Copa Alagoas)	0	6	0
CRB	2024	Série B	7	0	0	0	1	0	—		2 (Note: Appearance(s) in Copa do Nordeste)	0	10	0
CRB	2025	Série B	6	0	8	0	2	0	—		6	0	22	0
CRB	Total		13	0	9	0	3	0	—		13	0	38	0
Career total			13	0	17	0	3	0	0	0	13	0	46	0

== Honours ==
CRB

- Campeonato Alagoano: 2023, 2024, 2025
