= Campeonato Alagoano Second Division =

Football league in Alagoas, Brazil

- Organising body: FAF
- Founded: 1941; 85 years ago
- Country: Brazil
- State: Alagoas
- Level on pyramid: 2
- Promotion to: Campeonato Alagoano
- Current champions: Sporting Teotônio (1st title) (2026)
- Most championships: Penedense; Santa Rita (3 titles)
- Website: FAF Official website

The Campeonato Alagoano Segunda Divisão is the second tier of the professional state football league in the Brazilian state of Alagoas. It is run by the Alagoas Football Federation (FAF).

== List of champions ==
Following is the list with all the champions of the second level of Alagoas.

Season	Champions	Runners-up
1941	Ipiranga (1)	Andaraí
1942	Comércio (1)	
1943	Olavo Bilac (1)	Ipiranga
1944-1988	Not held	
1989	Ipanema (1)	São Sebastião
1990	Bom Jesus (1)	
1991	Capela (1)	Jaciobá
1992	Corinthians (1)	
1993	Linense (1)	
1994	Sete de Setembro (1)	
1995	Miguelense (1)	
1996	São Sebastião (1)	Dínamo
1997	Corinthians (2)	
1998	Murici (1)	
1999	São Domingos (Note: São Domingos was the only registered for the 1999 tournament, being immediately declared champions.) (1)	—N/a
2000	Penedense (1)	Internacional
2001	Bom Jesus (2)	Igaci
2002	CSE (1)	Sete de Setembro
2003	Coruripe (1)	Sete de Setembro
2004	Penedense (2)	Dimensão Saúde
2005	CSA (1)	Ipanema
2006	Igaci (1)	Universal
2007	Santa Rita (1)	Universal
2008	Capelense (1)	CSE
2009	Santa Rita (2); União (Note: The 2009 tournament was divided after the final match was interrupted due to several ejections and a supposed stall for time from União.) (1)	—N/a
2010	CSA (2)	Sport Atalaia
2011	CEO (1)	Penedense
2012	Comercial (1)	União
2013	Santa Rita (3)	Coruripe
2014	Ipanema (2)	Sport Atalaia
2015	Sete de Setembro (2)	Penedense
2016	CEO (2)	Miguelense
2017	Dimensão Saúde (1)	Zumbi
2018	Jaciobá (1)	Sete de Setembro
2019	CSE (2)	Zumbi
2020	Aliança (1)	FF Sports
2021	Cruzeiro de Arapiraca (1)	Zumbi
2022	Coruripe (2)	Zumbi
2023	Penedense (3)	Zumbi
2024	Igaci (2)	Zumbi
2025	Cruzeiro de Arapiraca (2)	Guarany (Note: After finishing as runner-up, Guarany Alagoano, originally from Maceió, changed its name to Murici Sport Clube and moved to the city of Murici. Murici Futebol Clube, which was penalized by a transfer ban, withdrew from the state championship.)
2026	Sporting Teotônio (1)	Zumbi

== Titles by team ==
Teams in bold stills active.

Rank	Club	Winners	Winning years
1	Santa Rita	3	2007, 2009, 2013
1	**Penedense**	3	2000, 2004, 2023
2	Bom Jesus	2	1990, 2001
2	**CEO**	2	2011, 2016
2	Corinthians	2	1992, 1997
2	**Coruripe**	2	2003, 2022
2	**Cruzeiro de Arapiraca**	2	2021, 2025
2	**CSA**	2	2005, 2010
2	**CSE**	2	2002, 2019
2	**Igaci**	2	2006, 2024
2	Ipanema	2	1989, 2014
2	Sete de Setembro	2	1994, 2015
13	**Aliança**	1	2020
13	Capela	1	1991
13	Capelense	1	2008
13	**Comercial**	1	2012
13	Comércio	1	1942
13	**Dimensão Saúde**	1	2017
13	Ipiranga	1	1941
13	**Jaciobá**	1	2018
13	Linense	1	1993
13	**Miguelense**	1	1995
13	**Murici**	1	1998
13	Olavo Bilac	1	1943
13	São Domingos	1	1999
13	São Sebastião	1	1996
13	**Sporting Teotônio**	1	2026
13	União	1	2009

=== By city ===
City	Championships	Clubs
Maceió	10	Corinthians (2), CSA (2), Sete de Setembro (2), Aliança (1), Comércio (1), Ipiranga (1), Olavo Bilac (1)
Boca da Mata	3	Santa Rita (3)
Capela	3	Capela (1), Capelense (1), Dimensão Saúde (1)
Penedo	3	Penedense (3)
Arapiraca	2	Cruzeiro (2)
Coruripe	2	Coruripe (2)
Igaci	2	Igaci (2)
Matriz de Camaragibe	2	Bom Jesus (2)
Murici	2	Murici (1), São Domingos (1)
Olho d'Agua das Flores	2	CEO (2)
Palmeira dos Índios	2	CSE (2)
Santana do Ipanema	2	Ipanema (2)
Novo Lino	1	Linense (1)
Pão de Açúcar	1	Jaciobá (1)
Porto Calvo	1	São Sebastião (1)
São Miguel dos Campos	1	Miguelense (1)
Teotônio Vilela	1	Sporting Teotônio (1)
União dos Palmares	1	União (1)
Viçosa	1	Comercial (1)
