= Pedrinho (footballer, born February 2004) =

Brazilian footballer

Personal information
- Full name: Pedro Henrique Farias Alves de Araújo
- Date of birth: 4 February 2004 (age 22)
- Place of birth: Rio de Janeiro, Brazil
- Height: 1.73 m (5 ft 8 in)
- Position: Attacking midfielder

Team information
- Current team: Atlético Cearense

Youth career
- 2022: Portuguesa-RJ
- 2022: Serrano-RJ
- 2023: Jaciobá
- 2023: Bangu
- 2024: Aliança-AL
- 2024: Tirol

Senior career*
Years	Team	Apps	(Gls)
2024	Aliança-AL	5	(0)
2024	Tirol	0	(0)
2025–	Atlético Cearense	2	(0)
- * Club domestic league appearances and goals as of 25 February 2025

Pedro Henrique Farias Alves de Araújo (born 4 February 2004), simply known as Pedrinho, is a Brazilian professional footballer who plays as an attacking midfielder for Atlético Cearense.

== Career ==
Pedrinho played in the youth sectors of several teams: Portuguesa, Serrano and Bangu in Rio de Janeiro, Jaciobá and Desportivo Aliança in Alagoas, and Tirol in Ceará.

In 2024, with Desportivo Aliança, he began his professional career playing for the club in the 2024 Campeonato Alagoano. In 2025, he was signed by FC Atlético Cearense. Son of former player Magno Alves, he saw his father return from retirement to play alongside him, a feat also accomplished by Rivaldo and Rivaldinho in 2014–15 for Mogi Mirim, and Romário and Romarinho in 2024 at America-RJ.

== See also ==
- List of association football families
