= Estevam Soares =

Brazilian footballer and manager (born 1956)

Personal information
- Full name: Estevam Eduardo Lemos Soares
- Date of birth: 10 June 1956 (age 70)
- Place of birth: Cafelândia, Brazil
- Height: 1.75 m (5 ft 9 in)

Team information
- Current team: Desportiva Aliança (manager)

Youth career
- 1972–1973: Guarani

Senior career*
Years	Team	Apps	(Gls)
1974–1976	Guarani		
1976	XV de Jaú		
1977–1981	São Paulo		
1982	Portuguesa		
1985–1986	Bahia		
1987	Sport		
1988	Vitória		
1989	Ponte Preta		
1991	Sampaio Corrêa		
1992	Fluminense de Feira		
1993	Primavera		

Managerial career
- 1993–1995: Primavera
- 1995: ABC
- 1995: URT
- 1995–1996: Guarani
- 1996: Inter de Limeira
- 1997: América de Natal
- 1998–1999: Guarani
- 1999: CSA
- 2000: Ponte Preta
- 2001: Náutico
- 2002: Olympic Beirut
- 2003: Guarani
- 2003: CRB
- 2003: Gama
- 2004: Ponte Preta
- 2004–2005: Palmeiras
- 2005: São Caetano
- 2006: Coritiba
- 2007–2008: Al-Ittihad
- 2008: Grêmio Barueri
- 2008–2009: Portuguesa
- 2009: Americana
- 2009: Grêmio Barueri
- 2009–2010: Botafogo
- 2010: Ceará
- 2011: São Bernardo
- 2011: Grêmio Barueri
- 2011: Ceará
- 2012: Oeste
- 2012: XV de Piracicaba
- 2012: Grêmio Barueri
- 2013: Atlético Sorocaba
- 2014: CSA
- 2015: Rio Claro
- 2015–2016: Portuguesa
- 2016: Tupi
- 2016: Bragantino
- 2017: Portuguesa
- 2018: Vitória da Conquista
- 2018: Itumbiara
- 2019: Central
- 2019: Altos
- 2019: Batatais
- 2020: Imperatriz
- 2021: Atlético Alagoinhas
- 2021–: Desportiva Aliança
- * Club domestic league appearances and goals

Estevam Eduardo Lemos Soares (born 10 June 1956 in Cafelândia, São Paulo), known as Estevam Soares, is a Brazilian football manager.

== Managerial statistics ==
As of 31 October 2026

Team	Nat	From	Record				
Team	Nat	From	G	W	D	L	Win %
Palmeiras	2004-2005	(Brazil)	47	23	13	11	48.94
Botafogo	2009	(Brazil)	30	11	8	11	36.67
Ceará	2009	(Brazil)	6	0	4	2	0.00
Ceará	2010	(Brazil)	8	1	2	5	12.50

== Honours ==
=== Manager ===
Inter de Limeira

- Campeonato Paulista Série A2: 1995

América-RN

- Campeonato Potiguar: 1997

CSA

- Campeonato Alagoano: 1999
