= João Fersura =

Brazilian footballer (born 2005)

Personal information
- Full name: João Gabriel Fersura Feu
- Date of birth: 20 April 2005 (age 21)
- Place of birth: Nova Friburgo, Brazil
- Height: 1.80 m (5 ft 11 in)
- Position: Winger

Team information
- Current team: Ibiza (on loan from Betis Deportivo)
- Number: 22

Youth career
- Fábrica de Craques

Senior career*
Years	Team	Apps	(Gls)
2022	Dimensão Saúde	0	(0)
2022	Grêmio Prudente	0	(0)
2023	FF Sport	0	(0)
2023–2024	Porto-PE	9	(1)
2024–	Betis Deportivo	21	(0)
2025–	→ Ibiza (loan)	4	(0)
- * Club domestic league appearances and goals as of 10 June 2026

João Gabriel Fersura Feu (born 20 April 2005) is a Brazilian footballer who plays as a winger for Spanish Primera Federación club Ibiza on loan from Betis Deportivo.

== Club career ==
Born in Nova Friburgo in Brazil, Fersura moved to Caruaru at the age of fifteen to pursue a career in professional football. Here he joined social project club Fábrica de Craques, before spending time with a number of lower division Brazilian clubs.

After spending a season with Porto-PE, he was promoted to the first team in 2024, making a handful of appearances in the Campeonato Pernambucano before being scouted by Spanish club Real Betis, as part of their Betis Talent programme, a project seeking to find players from lesser known leagues or teams to bring into Betis' academy. During their scouting of South America, Betis reportedly chose Fersura out of ten thousand players they had looked at, and Porto-PE had also received offers from a number of clubs in Brazil's top flight. He made the shock move officially in July 2024, signing a five-year contract.

== Style of play ==
Predominantly a right-winger, Fersura is left-footed, and while this would tend to encourage him to cut inside to favour his stronger foot, he is known to drive to the goal-line, beating players with his pace, before crossing with his weaker right foot.

== Career statistics ==
=== Club ===
As of 19 May 2025.

Appearances and goals by club, season and competition
Club	Season	League			Cup (Note: Includes Copa do Brasil and Copa del Rey)		Other		Total	
Club	Season	Division	Apps	Goals	Apps	Goals	Apps	Goals	Apps	Goals
Dimensão Capela	2022	–			0	0	4 (Note: Appearances in the Copa Alagoas)	1	4	1
Grêmio Prudente	2022	–			0	0	0	0	0	0
FF Sport	2023	–			0	0	0	0	0	0
Porto-PE	2023	–			0	0	0	0	0	0
Porto-PE	2024	–			0	0	9 (Note: Appearances in the Campeonato Pernambucano)	1	9	1
Porto-PE	Total		0	0	0	0	9	1	9	1
Betis Deportivo	2024–25	Primera Federación	20	0	0	0	0	0	20	0
Career total			20	0	0	0	13	2	33	2
