= Sport Club Bom Jesus =

Brazilian football club

Bom Jesus
- Full name: Sport Club Bom Jesus
- Nickname(s): Alvinegro de Matriz; Bonja
- Founded: 1 January 1928; 97 years ago
- Ground: Estádio Denis Loureiro
- Capacity: 4,000
- President: Geraldo Cavalcante
- 2006: Alagoano, 10th of 10 (relegated)
Home colors	Away colors

Sport Club Bom Jesus was a Brazilian football club based in Matriz de Camaragibe, Alagoas. The team last participated in the Campeonato Alagoano in the 2006 season.

The club was founded on 1 January 1928.

== Honours ==
- Campeonato Alagoano Second Division
  - Winners (2): 1990, 2001
