= Pão de Açúcar (disambiguation) =

Sugarloaf Mountain (Portuguese: Pão de Açúcar) is a peak situated in Rio de Janeiro, Brazil.

Pão de Açúcar may also refer to:

- Pão de Açúcar, Alagoas, a municipality located in Alagoas, Brazil
- Audax Rio de Janeiro Esporte Clube, a football club formerly known as Sendas Pão de Açúcar Esporte Clube
- Audax São Paulo Esporte Clube, a football club formerly known as Pão de Açúcar Esporte Clube
- GPA (company), a Brazilian retail company formerly known as Grupo Pão de Açúcar
- Pão de Açúcar (supermarket), a supermarket owned by GPA
