= Ferroviário Atlético Clube (AL) =

Ferroviário
- Full name: Ferroviário Atlético Clube
- Founded: 2 May 1937; 88 years ago
- Ground: Estádio Cleto Marques Luz
- Capacity: 4,000
- 2000: Alagoano 2ª Divisão, 6th of 6
Home colours	Away colours	Third colours

Ferroviário Atlético Clube was a Brazilian football club based in Maceió, Alagoas. The team last participated in the Campeonato Alagoano Segunda Divisão in the 2000 season. They won the Campeonato Alagoano twice.

== History ==
The club was founded on 1 May 1937. Ferroviário won the Campeonato Alagoano in 1953 and in 1954, sharing the 1953 title with ASA.

== Honours ==
- Campeonato Alagoano
  - Winners (1): 1954
  - Runners-up (1): 1953
- Torneio Início de Alagoas
  - Winners (1): 1952

== Stadium ==
Ferroviário Atlético Clube play their home games at Estádio Cleto Marques Luz. The stadium has a maximum capacity of 4,000 people.
