= 1960 Campeonato Brasileiro Série A =

Campeonato Brasileiro Série A
- Season: 1960
- Dates: 6 September – 28 December 1960
- Champions: Palmeiras (1st title)
- Copa Libertadores: Palmeiras
- Matches: 37
- Goals: 119 (3.22 per match)
- Top goalscorer: Bececê (7 goals)
- Biggest home win: Fluminense 8-0 Fonseca

The 1960 Campeonato Brasileiro Série A (officially the 1960 Taça Brasil) was the 3rd edition of the Campeonato Brasileiro Série A. It began on 6 September 1960, and ended on 28 December 1960.

== Format ==
The competition was a single elimination knockout tournament featuring two-legged ties, with a Tie-Break (play-off) if the sides were tied on points (however, if the tie-break was a draw, the aggregate score of the first two legs was used to determine the winner).

== Teams ==
Seventeen state champions qualified for the tournament.

Team	Home city	Home ground
(Rio Grande do Norte) ABC	Natal	
Bahia	Salvador	
(Alagoas) Capelense	Capela	
(Paraná (state)) Coritiba	Curitiba	
(Minas Gerais) Cruzeiro	Belo Horizonte	
(Paraíba) Estrela do Mar	João Pessoa	
(Guanabara (state)) Fluminense	Rio de Janeiro	
(Rio de Janeiro (state)) Fonseca	Niterói	
(Ceará) Fortaleza	Fortaleza	
(Rio Grande do Sul) Grêmio	Porto Alegre	
(Maranhão) Moto Club	São Luís	
(São Paulo (state)) Palmeiras	São Paulo	
(Santa Catarina (state)) Paula Ramos	Florianópolis	
(Pará) Paysandu	Belém	
(Espírito Santo) Rio Branco-ES	Vitória	
(Sergipe) Santa Cruz-SE	Estância	
(Pernambuco) Santa Cruz	Recife	

== Northern Zone ==
=== Northeastern Group ===
Semi-Final			Scores		
	Points		1st leg	2nd leg	Tie-Break
Bahia	2 : 2	Santa Cruz-SE	3 - 1	1 - 2	0 - 0
Bahia qualified thanks to a better Goal Difference over the first 2 legs.

Final			Scores	
	Points		1st leg	2nd leg
Bahia	4 : 0	Capelense	2 - 0	2 - 1

=== Northern Group ===
1st Round			Scores		
	Points		1st leg	2nd leg	Tie-break
Estrela do Mar	2 : 2	ABC	2 - 1	1 - 5	1 - 5
Paysandu	0 : 4	Moto Club	2 - 3	2 - 4	—

Semi-Final			Scores	
	Points		1st leg	2nd leg
Fortaleza	3 : 1	ABC	3 - 0	1 - 1

Final			Scores	
	Points		1st leg	2nd leg
Fortaleza	3 : 1	Moto Club	2 - 0	1 - 1

=== Northern Zone Final ===
			Scores	
	Points		1st leg	2nd leg
Fortaleza	3 : 1	Bahia	2 - 1	0 - 0

== Southern Zone ==
=== Southern Group ===
Semi-Finals			Scores	
	Points		1st leg	2nd leg
Paula Ramos	1 : 3	Coritiba	1 - 1	0 - 5

Final			Scores		
	Points		1st leg	2nd leg	Tie-break
Coritiba	2 : 2	Grêmio	1 - 1	3 - 3	1 - 1

=== Eastern Group ===
Semi-Finals			Scores		
	Points		1st leg	2nd leg	Tie-Break
Cruzeiro	2 : 2	Rio Branco-ES	0 - 1	1 - 0	1 - 0
Fonseca	0 : 4	Fluminense	0 - 3	0 - 8	—

Final			Scores	
	Points		1st leg	2nd leg
Cruzeiro	1 : 3	Fluminense	1 - 1	1 - 4

=== Southern Zone Final ===
			Scores		
	Points		1st leg	2nd leg	Tie-Break
Grêmio	2 : 2	Fluminense	1 - 0	2 - 4	1 - 1
Fluminense qualified thanks to a better Goal Difference over the first 2 legs.

== National Semi-Finals ==
Palmeiras and Santa Cruz entered at this stage.

			Scores	
	Points		1st leg	2nd leg
Palmeiras	3 : 1	Fluminense	0 - 0	1 - 0
Santa Cruz	1 : 3	Fortaleza	2 - 2	1 - 2

== National Final ==
			Scores	
	Points		1st leg	2nd leg
Fortaleza	0 : 4	Palmeiras	1 - 3	2 - 8
