= Edson Gaúcho =

Brazilian footballer and manager (born 1955)

Personal information
- Full name: Edson José Valandro
- Date of birth: 6 June 1955 (age 71)
- Place of birth: Caxias do Sul, Brazil
- Height: 1.75 m (5 ft 9 in)
- Position: Defender

Senior career*
Years	Team	Apps	(Gls)
1974–1976	Aimoré		
1976	14 de Julho		
1977–1981	Juventude		
1982–1982	Santa Cruz		
1983–1987	Náutico		
1987–1988	Rio Ave		
1988–1989	Lausanne		
1989	Valeriodoce		

Managerial career
- 1993: América Mineiro (U-20)
- 1995–1996: Novo Hamburgo
- 1996: Portuguesa (U-20)
- 1997: Operário
- 1997: Comercial-AL
- 1998: Botafogo da Paraiba
- 2000: Botafogo da Paraiba
- 2001: Caxias
- 2002: Criciúma
- 2003: Paulista
- 2003: Criciúma
- 2003: Náutico
- 2004: Joinville
- 2005: Vila Nova
- 2005: Goiás
- 2005: Criciúma
- 2006: Criciúma
- 2006: Avaí
- 2007: Atlético Goianiense
- 2007–2008: Juventude
- 2008: Criciúma
- 2009: Paysandu
- 2010–2011: Vila Nova
- 2011: Criciúma
- 2011: Paysandu
- 2012: Brasiliense
- 2012: Remo
- 2013: ASA
- 2014–2015: Anapolina
- * Club domestic league appearances and goals

== Career ==
Valandro began his professional career in the Aimoré in 1974. Later he played for the teams: 14 de Julho, Juventude, Santa Cruz, Náutico, Rio Ave and Lausanne, where he finished his career in 1989.

As a manager, Valandro worked as an assistant in the Cruzeiro and América Mineiro (youth team). Since 1995 he has coached the following: Novo Hamburgo, Portuguesa (youth), Operário, Comercial-AL, Botafogo-PB, Caxias, Criciúma, Paulista, Náutico, Joinville, Vila Nova, Goiás, Avaí, Atlético Goianiense, Juventude, Paysandu, Brasiliense, Remo, Asa and Anapolina.

== Honours ==
Operário

- Campeonato Sul-Mato-Grossense: 1997

Criciúma

- Campeonato Brasileiro Série B: 2002

Vila Nova

- Campeonato Goiano: 2005

Paysandu

- Campeonato Paraense: 2009
