= Jaciobá Atlético Clube =

Jaciobá
- Full name: Jaciobá Atlético Clube
- Nickname: Azulão do Sertão (Sertão's Big Blue)
- Founded: 25 January 1964; 61 years ago
- Ground: Elisão
- Capacity: 4,000
- Chairman: Lucilo Brandão
- Head coach: Distéfano Brandão
- League: Campeonato Alagoano Segunda Divisão
- 2025: Alagoano Segunda Divisão, 8th of 8
Home colours	Away colours	Third colours

Jaciobá Atlético Clube is a Brazilian professional football club based in Pão de Açúcar, Alagoas. It competes in the Campeonato Alagoano, the top flight of the Alagoas state football league.

== History ==
Founded in 1964, the club first reached the first division of the Campeonato Alagoano in 1999, after finishing second in the previous year's second division. After finishing seventh and being relegated, the club went into amateur state and changed name to Jacyobá Atlético Clube. In June 2018, the club was again active when it submitted its registration to play in the season's second division.

Jacyobá then won the 2018 second division on the goal difference rule, returning to the top tier after 20 years. In the 2019 Alagoano, the club finished fourth and qualified for the 2020 Campeonato Brasileiro Série D.

Despite the name with an Y was only used during the amateur period, the club only officially changed back to its previous name Jaciobá Atlético Clube for the 2020 season.

== Honours ==
- Campeonato Alagoano Segunda Divisão: 2018
