= Igaci FC =

Brazilian sports club

- Full name: Igaci Futebol Clube
- Nickname(s): Raposa do Agreste (Fox of Agreste)
- Founded: February 10, 2001; 24 years ago
- League: Alagoano
- 2024: Campeonato Alagoano Second Division, 1st (promoted)
Home colours	Away colours

Igaci Futebol Clube is a Brazilian sports club based in Igaci, Alagoas. Founded on February 10, 2001, Igaci won the Campeonato Alagoano Second Division in 2006.

== History ==
Igaci competed in the first state division between 2007 and 2010, when they withdrew from the competition. They won their second division title in 2024.

== Honours ==
- Campeonato Alagoano Second Division
  - Winners (2): 2006, 2024
