= Federação Alagoana de Futebol =

Brazilian football state federation

- Formation: 14 March 1927; 99 years ago
- Type: List of international sport federations
- Headquarters: Maceió, Alagoas, Brazil
- Official language: Portuguese
- President: Gustavo Dantas Feijó
- Website: futeboldealagoas.net

The Federação Alagoana de Futebol (English: Football Federation of Alagoas) was founded on March 14, 1927, and it manages all the official football tournaments within the state of Alagoas, which are the Campeonato Alagoano and the Campeonato Alagoano lower levels, and represents the clubs at the Brazilian Football Confederation (CBF).

== Current clubs in Brasileirão ==
List of clubs from Alagoas competing in the 2023 season across the Brazilian football league system.

Club	City
Série B
CRB	Maceió
Série C
CSA	Maceió
Série D
ASA	Arapiraca
Cruzeiro	Arapiraca
