= Desportivo Aliança =

Brazilian football club

- Full name: Desportivo Aliança
- Nickname(s): Tricolor Alagoano
- Founded: 10 March 2012; 13 years ago
- Ground: Estádio da UFAL
- Capacity: 3,000
- President: Luciano Lessa
- Head Coach: Estevam Soares
- League: Campeonato Alagoano Segunda Divisão
- 2024: Alagoano Segunda Divisão, 6th of 10
Home colours	Away colours

Desportivo Aliança, sometimes known as just Aliança, is a Brazilian football club based in Maceió, Alagoas state. Founded in 2012, the club plays in the Campeonato Alagoano.

== History ==
Founded on 10 March 2012, Aliança was born after their board bought out Vila Nova, an amateur club from the city of Rio Largo founded in 1990. The club only played their first competition in the following year, appearing in the Campeonato Alagoano Segunda Divisão and playing in Pilar.

Aliança played in Coruripe in 2013 and 2014, and did not feature a senior team in 2015 and 2016. The first team returned in 2017, playing in Passo de Camaragibe.

In 2020, Aliança was based in Igaci and achieved promotion to the Campeonato Alagoano after winning the second division. Ahead of the 2021 season, the club moved to Maceió.

== Honours ==
- Campeonato Alagoano Segunda Divisão: 2020
