= Zumbi Esporte Clube =

Brazilian football club

Zumbi
- Full name: Zumbi Esporte Clube
- Nickname(s): Alviverde; Ganga-Zumba; Pantera Verde
- Founded: 15 November 1954; 70 years ago
- Ground: Praxedão
- Capacity: 3,000
- League: Campeonato Alagoano Segunda Divisão
- 2021: Alagoano 2ª Divisão, 2nd of 7
Home colours	Away colours

Zumbi Esporte Clube is a Brazilian football club based in União dos Palmares, Alagoas. It competes in the Campeonato Alagoano Segunda Divisão, the second division of the Alagoas state football league.

== History ==
The club was founded on 15 November 1954, being named after Zumbi, who was the last leader of the Quilombo dos Palmares.

== Stadium ==
Zumbi Esporte Clube play their home games at Estádio Orlando Gomes de Barros, nicknamed Praxedão. The stadium has a maximum capacity of 3,000 people.
