= Cafelândia, São Paulo =

Cafelândia
- Municipality
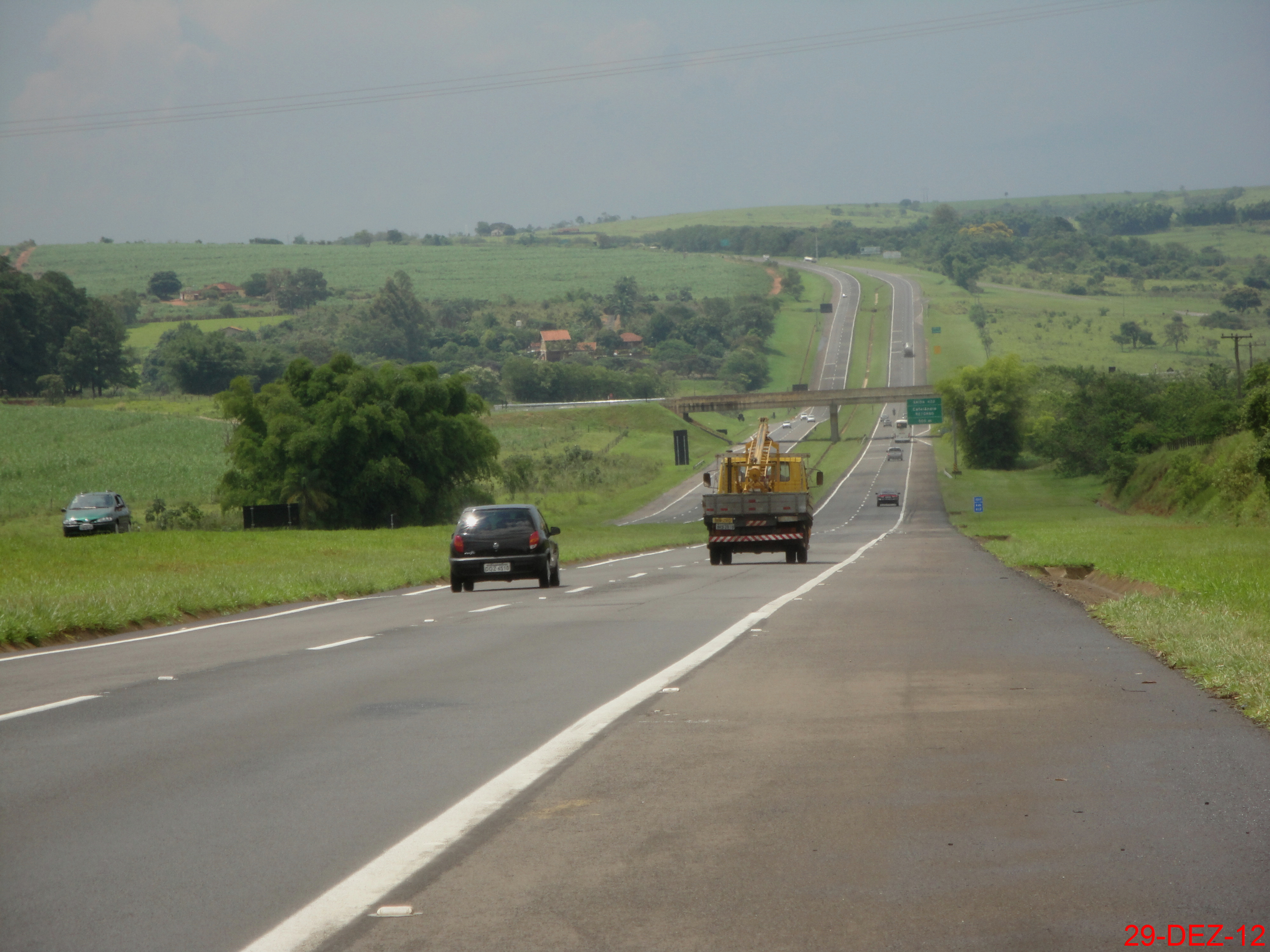

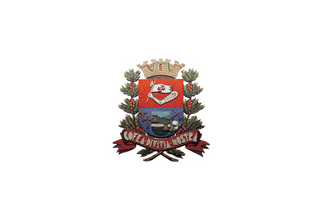
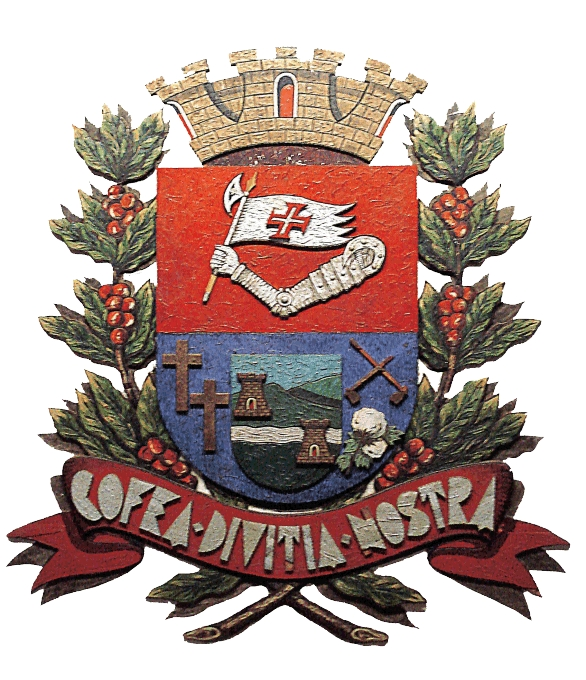
- Flag Coat of arms

- Location in São Paulo state

- Location in Brazil
- Coordinates: 21°48′9″S 49°36′36″W
- Country: Brazil
- Region: Southeast
- State: São Paulo

Area
  - Total: 920 km^{2} (360 sq mi)

Population (2020)
  - Total: 17,843
  - Density: 19/km^{2} (50/sq mi)
- Time zone: UTC−3 (BRT)

Cafelândia is a municipality of the state of São Paulo in Brazil. The population is 17,843 (2020 est.) in an area of 920 km^{2} (360 mi^{2}). The elevation is 445 m (1,460 ft).

== Demographics ==
Historical population (municipality)
Year	Population	%±
1940	36,006	—
1950	27,066	−24.8%
1960	26,253	−3.0%
1970	17,592	−33.0%
1980	17,480	−0.6%
1991	15,257	−12.7%
2000	15,793	3.5%
2010	16,607	5.2%
2022	16,654	0.3%

== Media ==
In telecommunications, the city was served by Companhia Telefônica Brasileira until 1973, when it began to be served by Telecomunicações de São Paulo. In July 1998, this company was acquired by Telefónica, which adopted the Vivo brand in 2012.

The company is currently an operator of cell phones, fixed lines, internet (fiber optics/4G) and television (satellite and cable).

== See also ==
- List of municipalities in São Paulo
