= Esporte Clube Cruzeiro (Arapiraca) =

Brazilian football club

Cruzeiro de Arapiraca
- Full name: Esporte Clube Cruzeiro
- Nickname: Cruzeiro Alagoano
- Founded: 7 September 1983; 28 May 2019; 7 years ago (refounded)
- Ground: Coaracy da Mata Fonseca
- Capacity: 12,000
- President: Joel Rocha
- Head coach: Elenilson Santos
- League: Campeonato Alagoano
- 2025: Alagoano Segunda Divisão, 1st of 8 (champions)
Home colours	Away colours

Esporte Clube Cruzeiro, commonly known as Cruzeiro de Arapiraca or just Cruzeiro, is a Brazilian football club based in Arapiraca, Alagoas. Founded in 1983, dissolved in 1997, and refounded in 2019, the club plays in the Campeonato Alagoano.

== History ==
Founded on 7 September 1983, the club first reached the first division of the Campeonato Alagoano in 1987. The club reached the fourth position in the 1994 Copa do Nordeste, before being dissolved in 1997. During that period, international footballer Dida played at the club.

In July 2019, after nearly 23 years inactive, Cruzeiro was refounded. The club returned to a senior competition in the 2021 Campeonato Alagoano Segunda Divisão, reaching the first division after 26 years.

Cruzeiro also won the 2022 Copa Alagoas, and achieved a place in the 2023 Série D.

== Honours ==
- Copa Alagoas
  - Winners (1): 2022
- Campeonato Alagoano Segunda Divisão
  - Winners (2): 2021, 2025
