= Clube Sportivo Capelense =

Capelense
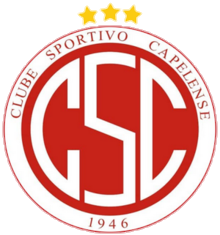
- Full name: Clube Sportivo Capelense
- Nickname(s): Tri-Campeão
- Founded: 4 April 1946; 78 years ago
- Ground: Estádio Manoel Moreira
- Capacity: 5,000
- 2011: Alagoano 2ª Divisão, 11th of 12
Home colors	Away colors

Clube Sportivo Capelense was a Brazilian football club based in Capela, Alagoas. The team last participated in the Campeonato Alagoano Segunda Divisão in the 2011 season.

They competed in the Copa do Brasil once and twice in the Taça Brasil.

== History ==
The club was founded on 19 May 1945. They won the Campeonato Alagoano in 1959, 1962 and in 1989. The club participated in the Taça Brasil in 1960, when they were defeated in the Northeastern Final to Bahia, and competed again in 1963. Capelense competed in the Copa do Brasil in 1990, when they were eliminated in the First Round by Flamengo. The club won the Campeonato Alagoano Second Level in 2008.

== Honours ==
- Campeonato Alagoano
  - Winners (3): 1959, 1962, 1989
  - Runners-up (3): 1960, 1961, 1965
- Campeonato Alagoano Second Level
  - Winners (1): 2008

== Stadium ==
Centro Sportivo Capelense play their home games at Estádio Manoel Moreira. The stadium has a maximum capacity of 5,000 people.
