= Ipanema Atlético Clube =

Ipanema
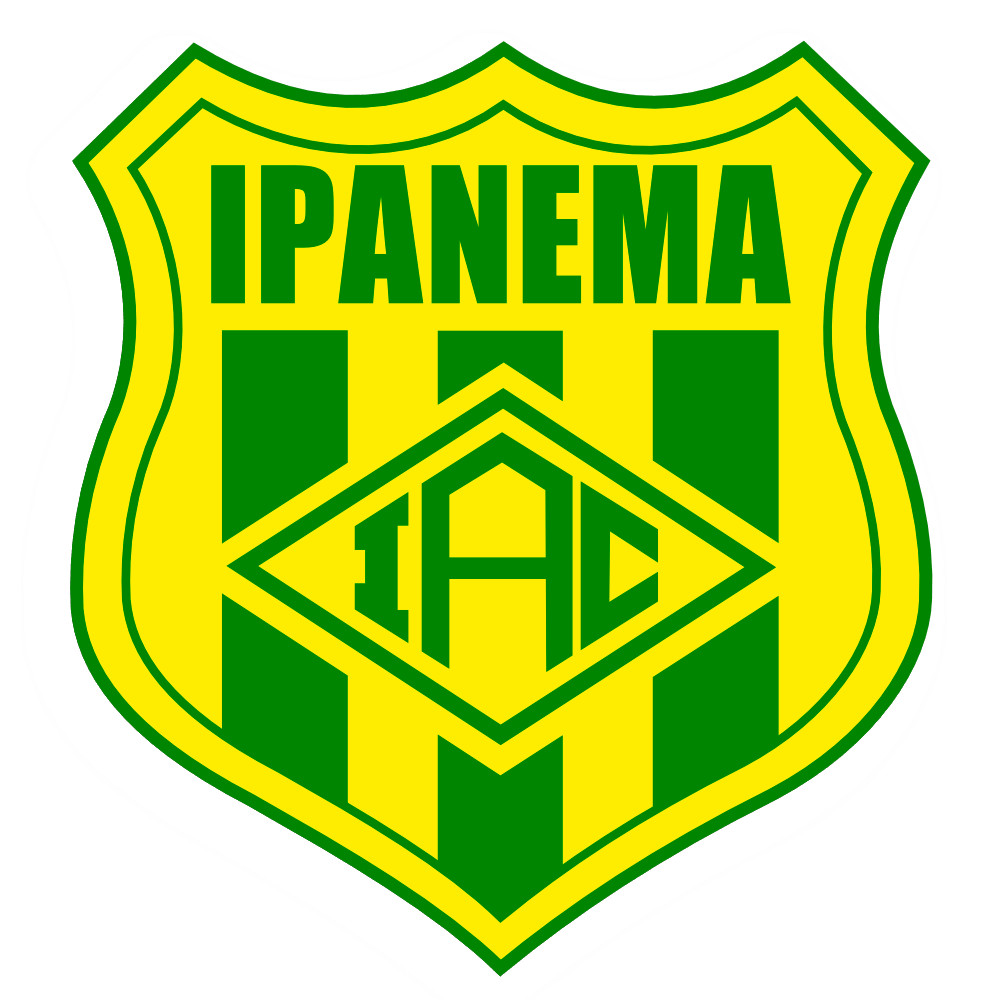
- Full name: Ipanema Atlético Clube
- Nickname: Canarinho do Sertão
- Founded: 5 May 1923; 102 years ago
- Ground: Estádio Governador Arnon de Melo
- Capacity: 6,000
- 2017: Alagoano 2ª Divisão, 5th of 9
Home colours	Away colours

Ipanema Atlético Clube is an amateur Brazilian football club based in Santana do Ipanema, Alagoas. The team last participated in the Campeonato Alagoano Segunda Divisão in the 2017 season.

== History ==
The club was founded on 5 May 1923, as Ipanema Sport Club, eventually being renamed to Ipanema Atlético Clube. Ipanema lost the 1992 Campeonato Alagoano to CRB.

== Stadium ==
Ipanema Atlético Clube play their home games at Estádio Governador Arnon de Melo. The stadium has a maximum capacity of 6,000 people.

== Honours ==
- Campeonato Alagoano
  - Runners-up (1): 1992
- Campeonato Alagoano Second Division
  - Winners (2): 1989, 2014
