= Sport Club Santa Rita =

Brazilian football club

Santa Rita
- Full name: Sport Club Santa Rita
- Nicknames: Rubro-Negro; Leão da Mata
- Founded: 22 May 1974; 51 years ago
- Ground: Estádio Olival Elias de Moraes
- Capacity: 3,500
- 2018: Alagoano, 9th of 9 (relegated)
Home colors	Away colors

Sport Club Santa Rita is a currently inactive Brazilian football club based in Boca da Mata, Alagoas. The team currently doesn't play in any league, having last participated in the Campeonato Alagoano in the 2018 season.

== History ==
The club was founded on 3 January 1974 as Associação Atlética Santa Rita. They won the Second Division of the Campeonato Alagoano in 2007.

== Honours ==
- Campeonato Alagoano Second Division
  - Winners (3): 2007, 2009, 2013

== Stadium ==
Santa Rita play their home games at Estádio Olival Elias de Moraes. The stadium has a maximum capacity of 3,500 people.
