= Matriz de Camaragibe =

Municipality of Alagoas, Brazil

- Municipality
- Flag

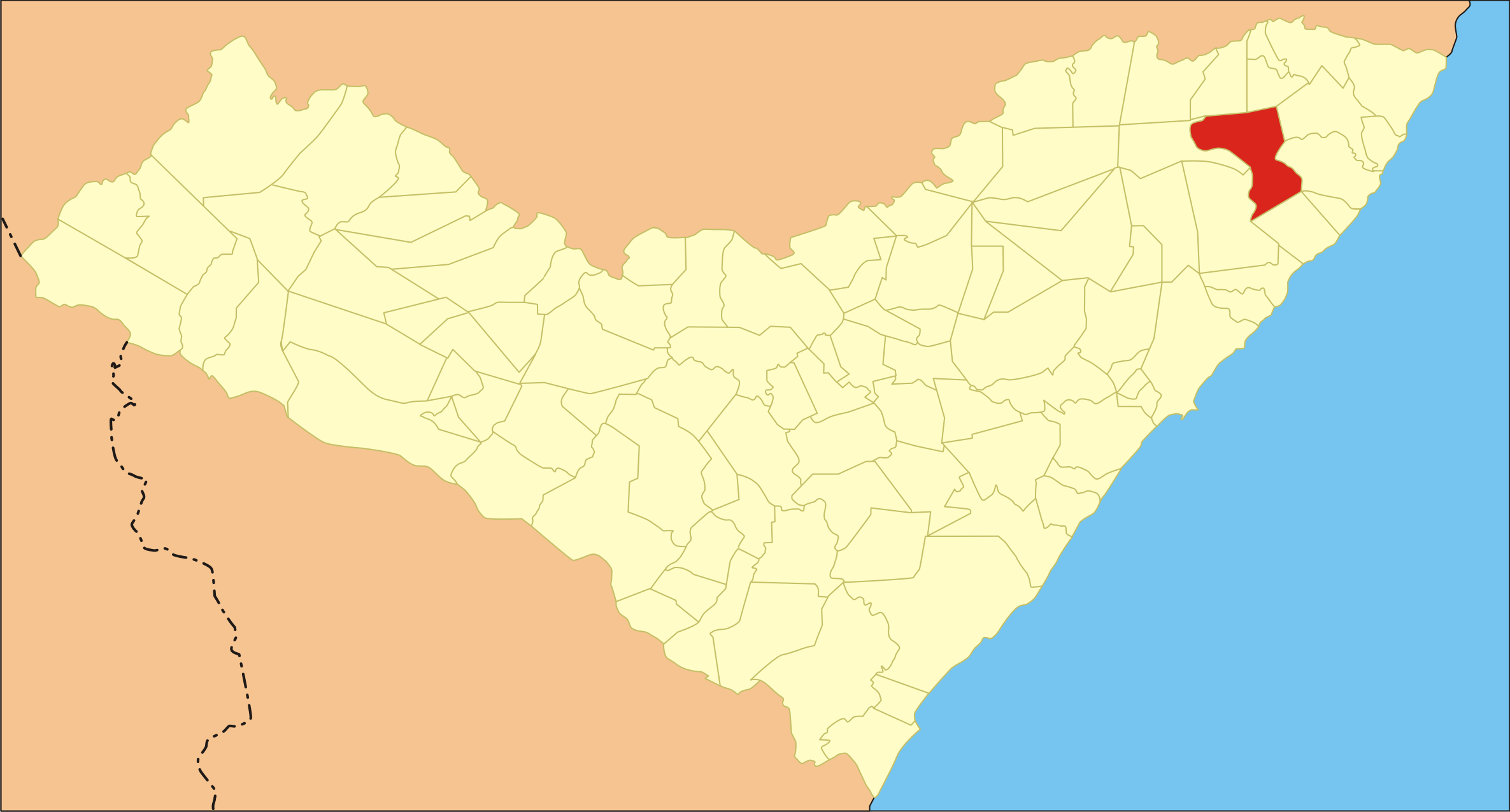
- Location of Matriz de Camaragibe in the State of Alagoas

- Location in Brazil
- Coordinates: 9°09′07″S 35°31′58″W
- Country: Brazil

Population (2020 est)
  - Total: 24,634
- Time zone: UTC−3 (BRT)
- Website: Official website (on 2012-11-26 the official website address above is not a functioning website address)

Matriz de Camaragibe (Central northeastern portuguese pronunciation: [maˈtɾis ˈdɪ kamɐɾɐˈʒibɪ]) is a municipality located in the Brazilian state of Alagoas.

Its population is 24,634 (2020) and its area is 330 km².
