= Associação Sportiva São Domingos =

São Domingos
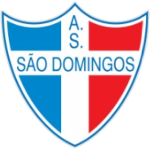
- Full name: Associação Sportiva São Domingos
- Nickname(s): Domingão; Tricolor da igreja
- Founded: 1 September 1964 (60 years ago)
- Ground: Cordeirão
- Capacity: 2,000
- 2018: Alagoano 2ª Divisão, 4th of 4
Home colors	Away colors

Associação Sportiva São Domingos was a Brazilian football club based in Marcehal Deodoro, Alagoas. The club last participated in the Campeonato Alagoano Segunda Divisão in the 2018 season.

They competed in the Série B once.

== History ==
The club was founded on 1 September 1970. They won the Campeonato Alagoano Second Level in 1999, since they were the only participating team. São Domingos competed in the Série B in 1972, when they were eliminated in the First Stage of the competition.

== Achievements ==
- Campeonato Alagoano Second Level:
  - Winners (1): 1999

== Stadium ==
Associação Sportiva São Domingos play their home games at Estádio José Cordeiro, nicknamed Cordeirão. The stadium has a maximum capacity of 2,000 people.
