= Viçosa, Alagoas =

Municipality in Alagoas, Brazil

Viçosa
- Municipality of Alagoas, Brazil
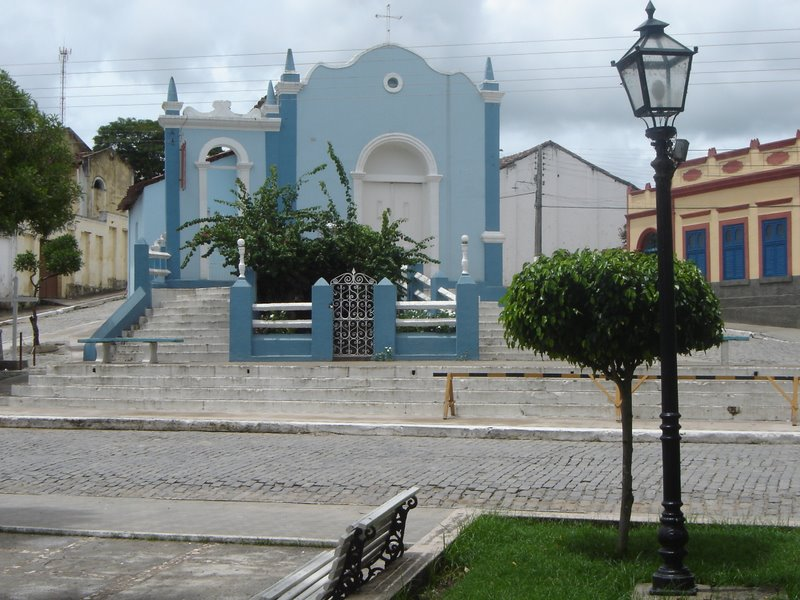
- Church of Our Lady of the Rosary

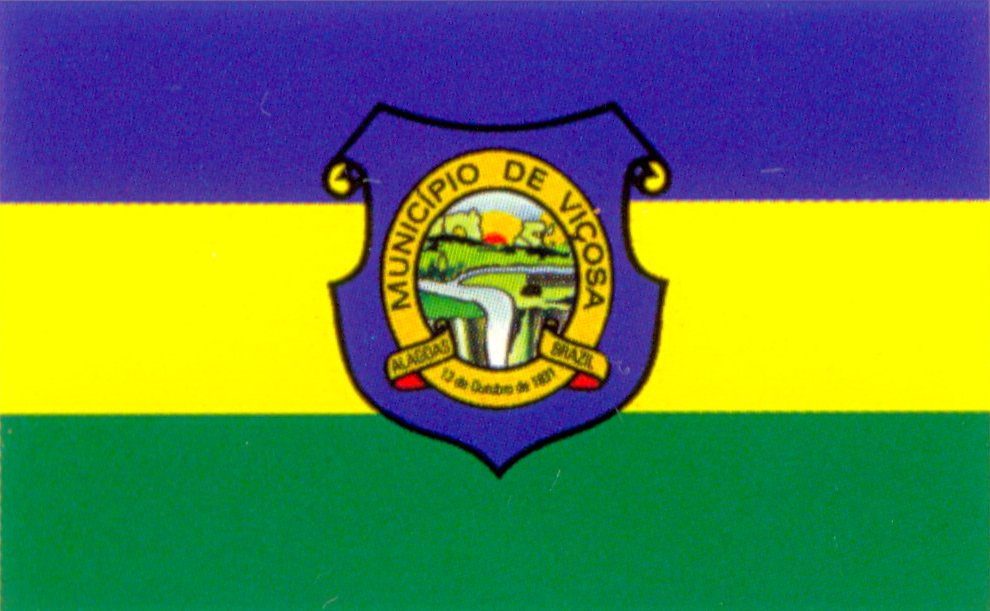
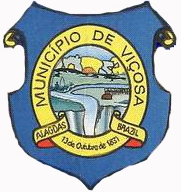
- Flag Coat of arms

- Location of Viçosa in Alagoas

- Location within Brazil Location within South America
- Coordinates: 9°22′17″S 36°14′27″W
- Country: Brazil
- Region: Northeast
- State: Alagoas
- Founded: 13 October 1831

Government
  - Mayor: João Victor Calheiros Amorim Santos (MDB) (2025-2028)
  - Vice Mayor: Afranio Tenorio Cavalcante Neto (MDB) (2025-2028)

Area
  - Total: 365.644 km^{2} (141.176 sq mi)
- Elevation: 210 m (690 ft)

Population (2022)
  - Total: 24,092
  - Density: 65.49/km^{2} (169.6/sq mi)
- Demonym: Viçosense (Brazilian Portuguese)
- Time zone: UTC-03:00 (Brasília Time)
- Postal code: 57700-000, 57710-000
- HDI (2010): 0.586 – medium
- Website: vicosa.al.gov.br

Viçosa (Central northeastern portuguese pronunciation: [viˈsɔzɐ]) is a Brazilian municipality in Alagoas state. Located inland on the zone of a former portion of the Atlantic Rain Forest, it is 86 km away from the state capital Maceió. Its population was 25,693 (2020) and its area is 354.76 km^{2}.

== See also ==
- List of municipalities in Alagoas
