= Pão de Açúcar, Alagoas =

Municipality in Alagoas, Brazil

Coordinates: 09°44′52″S 37°26′13″W

Pão de Açúcar
- Municipality
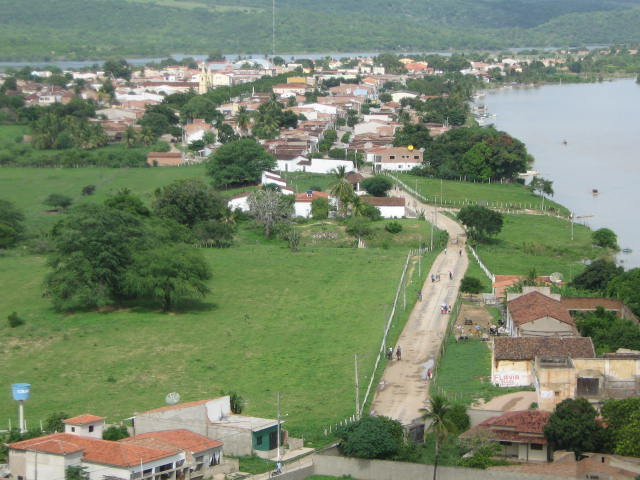

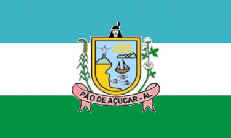
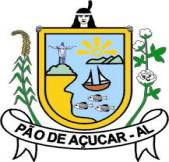
- Flag Coat of arms

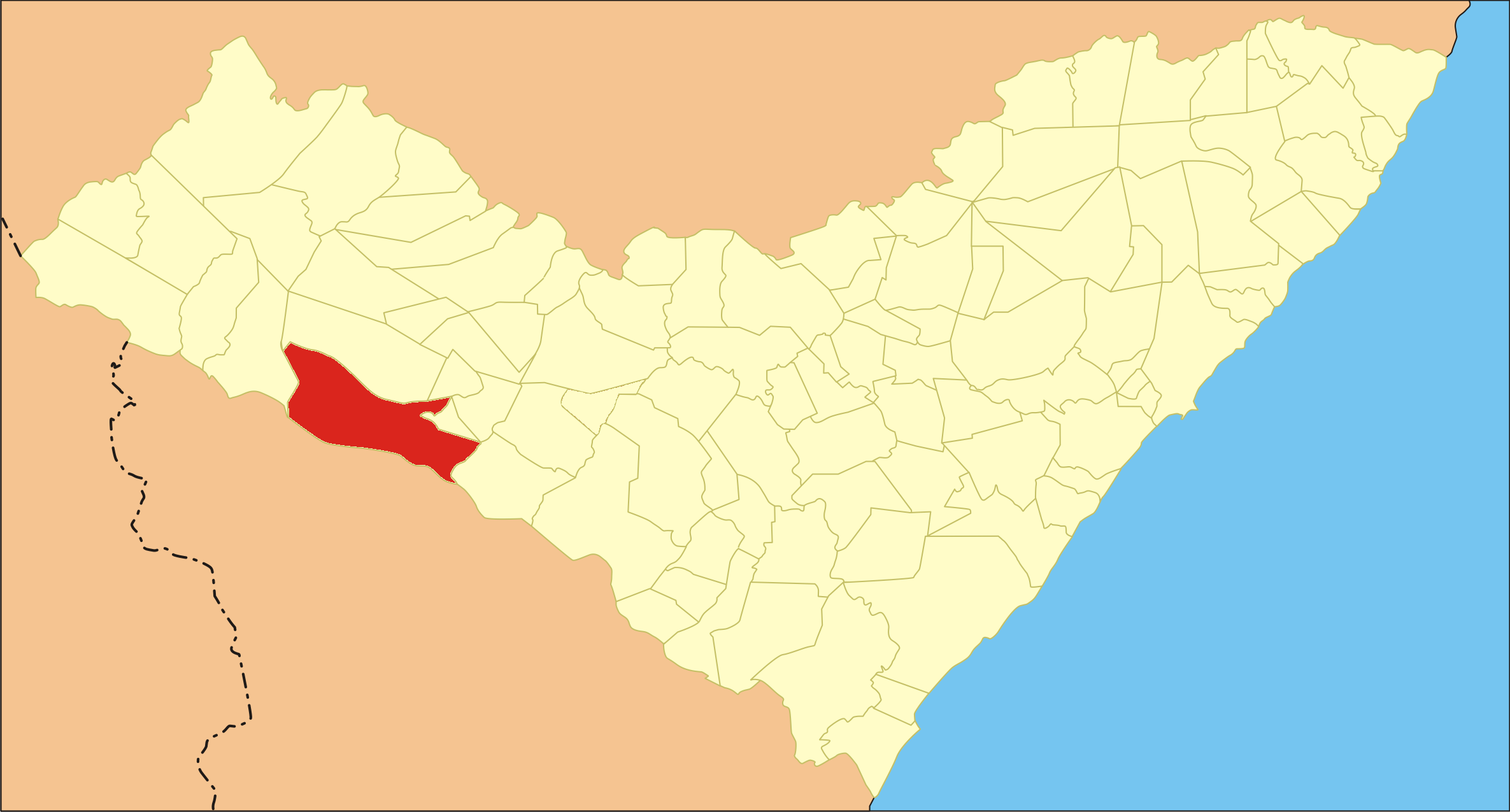
- Established: 3 March 1854

Area
  - Total: 658.955 km^{2} (254.424 sq mi)

Population
  - Total: 24,351
  - Density: 36.954/km^{2} (95.710/sq mi)

Pão de Açúcar (Central northeastern portuguese pronunciation: [ˈpɐ̃w ˈdi aˈsuˑkɐ]) is a municipality in the Brazilian state of Alagoas. Its population is 24,351 (2020) and its area is 659 km^{2} (254 sq mi).

== History ==
The Xokó people were reported to be living in Pão de Açúcar in 1746.

== Geography ==
=== Climate ===
Climate data for Pão de Açúcar, Alagoas (1981–2010, extremes 1977–present)
Month	Jan	Feb	Mar	Apr	May	Jun	Jul	Aug	Sep	Oct	Nov	Dec	Year
Record high °C (°F)	40.8 (105.4)	40.2 (104.4)	40.0 (104.0)	40.4 (104.7)	39.6 (103.3)	36.8 (98.2)	34.6 (94.3)	35.8 (96.4)	37.8 (100.0)	40.8 (105.4)	44.2 (111.6)	42.2 (108.0)	44.2 (111.6)
Mean daily maximum °C (°F)	36.3 (97.3)	36.2 (97.2)	36.0 (96.8)	34.4 (93.9)	31.9 (89.4)	29.6 (85.3)	29.2 (84.6)	29.9 (85.8)	32.3 (90.1)	34.7 (94.5)	36.1 (97.0)	36.7 (98.1)	33.6 (92.5)
Daily mean °C (°F)	29.4 (84.9)	29.4 (84.9)	29.3 (84.7)	28.4 (83.1)	26.7 (80.1)	25.0 (77.0)	24.4 (75.9)	24.5 (76.1)	26.1 (79.0)	28.1 (82.6)	29.3 (84.7)	29.7 (85.5)	27.5 (81.5)
Mean daily minimum °C (°F)	23.8 (74.8)	23.9 (75.0)	24.1 (75.4)	23.7 (74.7)	22.6 (72.7)	21.4 (70.5)	20.6 (69.1)	20.1 (68.2)	20.8 (69.4)	22.0 (71.6)	22.9 (73.2)	23.8 (74.8)	22.5 (72.5)
Record low °C (°F)	18.1 (64.6)	10.3 (50.5)	18.8 (65.8)	17.9 (64.2)	16.3 (61.3)	14.8 (58.6)	15.2 (59.4)	12.3 (54.1)	16.7 (62.1)	18.0 (64.4)	18.1 (64.6)	18.7 (65.7)	10.3 (50.5)
Average precipitation mm (inches)	56.5 (2.22)	36.7 (1.44)	50.9 (2.00)	59.8 (2.35)	86.5 (3.41)	90.0 (3.54)	81.5 (3.21)	56.1 (2.21)	24.6 (0.97)	19.3 (0.76)	12.0 (0.47)	12.8 (0.50)	586.7 (23.10)
Average precipitation days (≥ 1.0 mm)	4	4	5	7	13	14	13	11	5	2	2	2	82
Average relative humidity (%)	60.0	62.3	65.3	70.5	78.8	83.4	83.6	79.9	71.5	63.2	58.8	57.7	69.6
Mean monthly sunshine hours	269.0	233.8	247.4	226.7	192.7	162.5	175.6	195.7	239.4	276.2	284.5	275.2	2,778.7
Source 1: Instituto Nacional de Meteorologia
Source 2: Meteo Climat (record highs and lows)

== See also ==
- List of municipalities in Alagoas
