= Igaci =

Municipality of Alagoas, Brazil

- Municipality
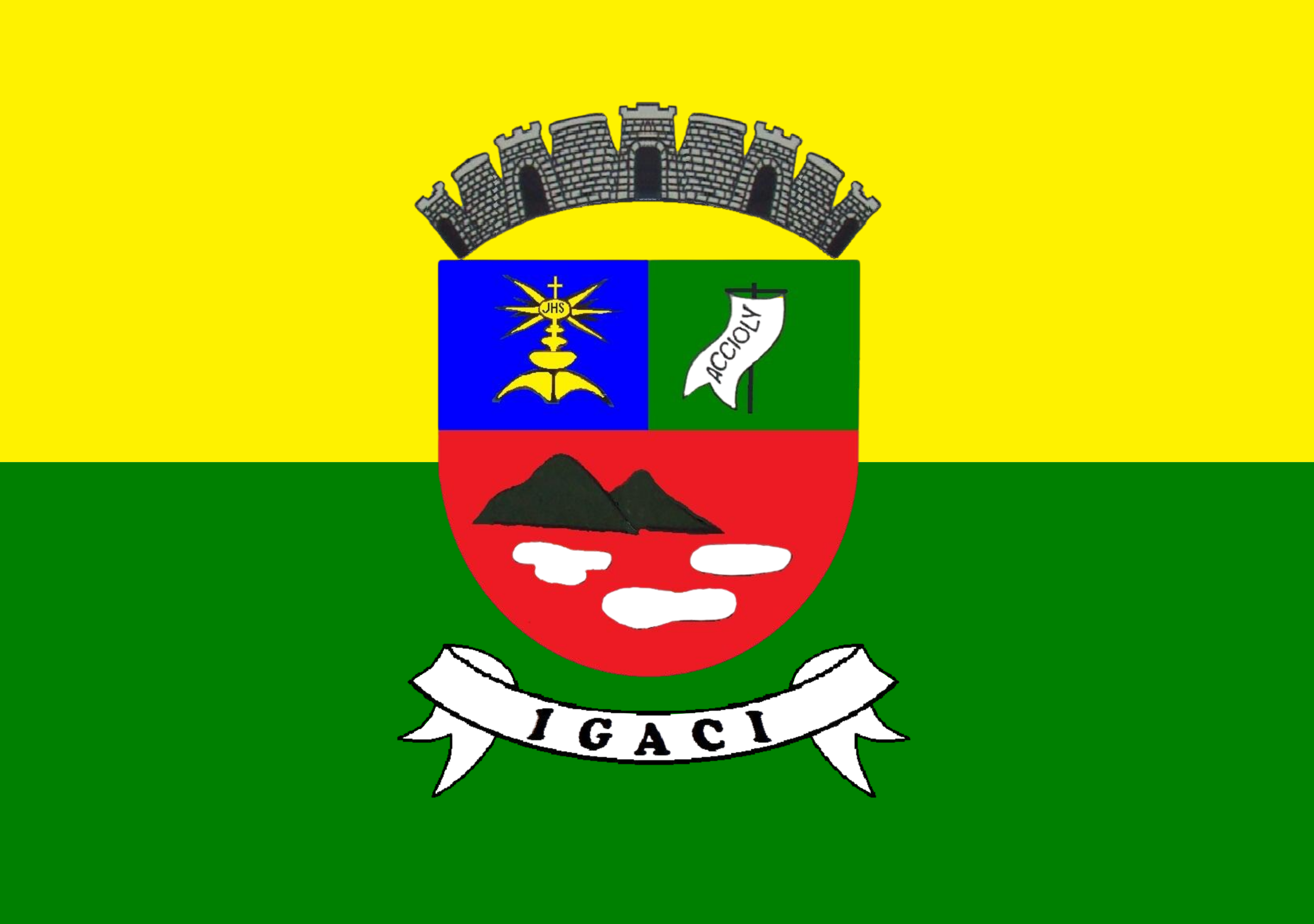
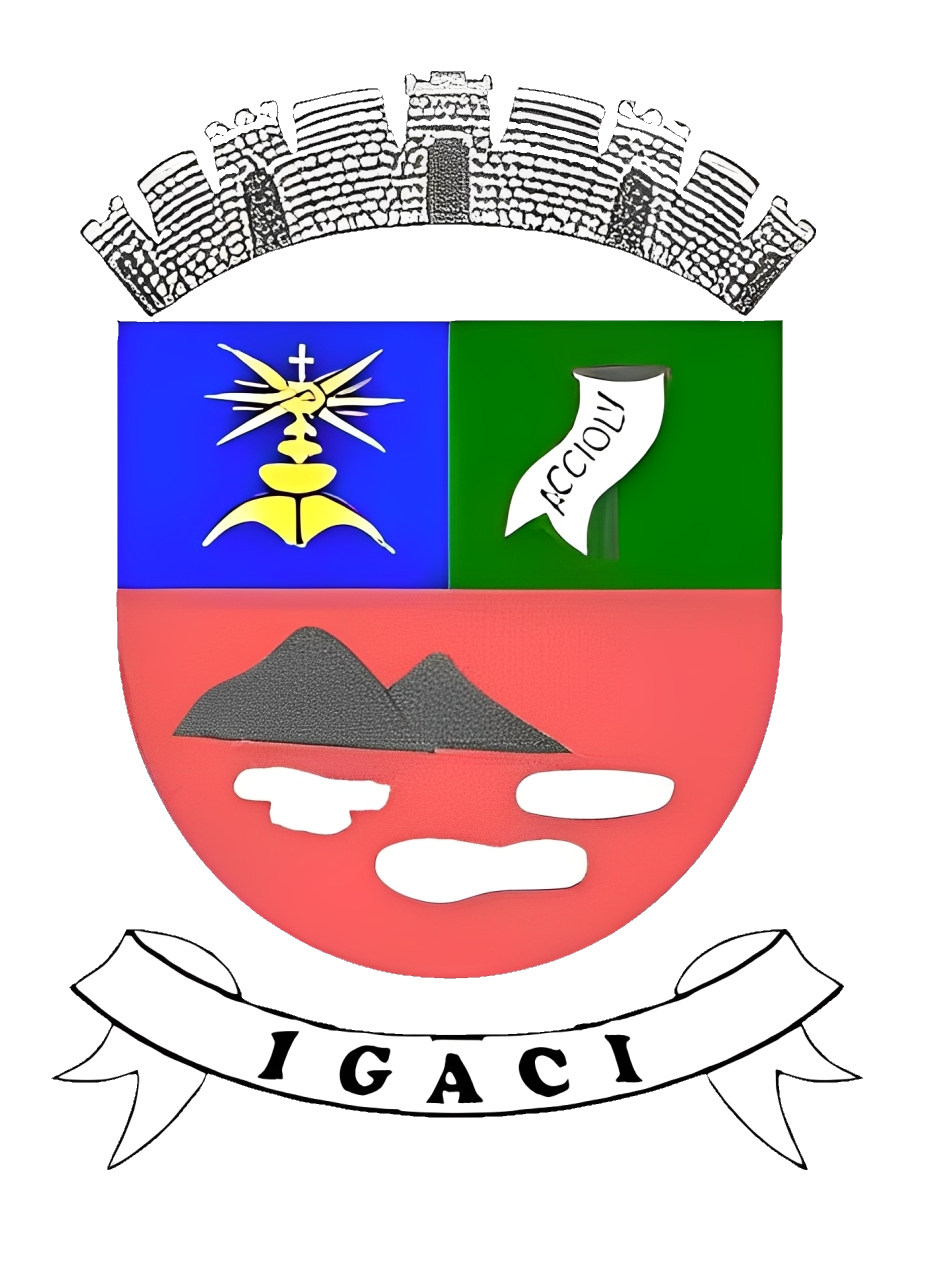
- Flag Coat of arms

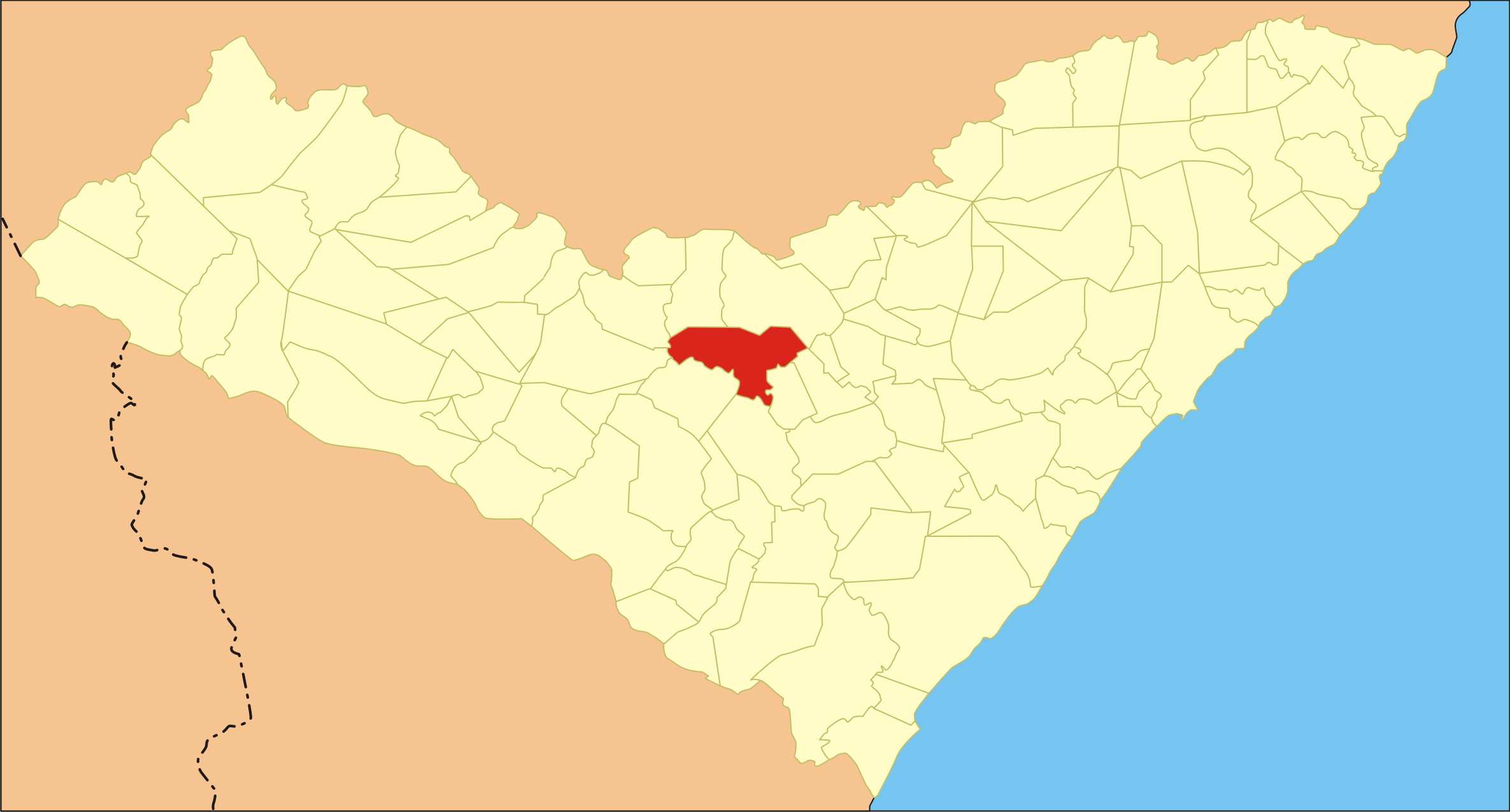
- Municipal location within the State of Alagoas

- Location in Brazil
- Coordinates: 9.53694°S 36.63361°W
- Country: Brazil
- State: Alagoas
- Municipality: Igaci

Government
  - Mayor: Oliveiro Torres Pianco

Area
  - Total: 334.346 km^{2} (129.092 sq mi)
- Elevation: 250 m (820 ft)

Population (2020)
  - Total: 25,613
  - Density: 76.606/km^{2} (198.41/sq mi)
- Demonym: igaciense
- Time zone: UTC−3 (BRT)
- Website: www.igaci.al.gov.br/site

Igaci (Central northeastern portuguese pronunciation: [iɡɐˈsi]) is a municipality in the Brazilian state of Alagoas. It has an area of 334.346 square kilometres (129.091 sq mi). The climate is tropical savanna climate. As of 2020 the estimated population was 25,613.

== Geography ==
Igaci is in the state of Alagoas, Brazil. It has an area of 334.346 square kilometres (129.092 sq mi) as of 2020. The elevation above sea level is about 250 metres (820 ft). It is located in the Palmeira dos Índios micro-region. It is 161 km from Maceió.

=== Climate ===
The Köppen climate type is As : Tropical savanna climate. The climate is hot and humid. Winter normally lasts from May to August. The average annual temperature is 25 °C (77 °F). The warmest month is December, when the average temperature is 28 °C (82 °F), and the coldest is July, with 20 °C (68 °F). The average annual rainfall is 972 millimetres (38.3 in). The wettest month is July, with 158 millimetres (6.2 in) of precipitation on average, and the driest is January, with 21 millimetres (0.83 in) of precipitation.

Igaci, AL

Climate chart (precipitation, max. and min. temperature)
J	F	M	A	M	J	J	A	S	O	N	D
21 36 22	33 33 21	39 33 21	102 30 21	142 27 20	117 24 18	158 23 17	109 24 16	66 28 18	111 34 20	31 36 21	45 39 22
- █ Average max. and min. temperatures in °C
- █ Precipitation totals in mm
Imperial conversion
J	F	M	A	M	J	J	A	S	O	N	D
0.8 97 72	1.3 91 70	1.5 91 70	4 86 70	5.6 81 68	4.6 75 64	6.2 73 63	4.3 75 61	2.6 82 64	4.4 93 68	1.2 97 70	1.8 102 72
- █ Average max. and min. temperatures in °F
- █ Precipitation totals in inches

== History ==
The settlement that is now the municipality of Igaci was founded by João de Lima Acioli of Portugal in the mid-19th century. The original name was Olho D'Água do Acioli, or Acioli's Waterholes, due to the many pools in the region. The abundant water attracted many families from areas that suffered from droughts, particularly in 1877, when there was a severe drought in Alagoas. The first urban settlement of the municipality was founded soon after. Early settlers in the town were Serapião Sampaio, Santos Silva, captain Bartolomeu de Souza Vergueiro, Justino Luiz, the Torres and Tomas de Albuquerque families and Carlos Pontes who later became an important figure in Brazilian literature and national politics.

Olho D'Água do Acioli was named a town and judicial district of Palmeira dos Índios by State law No. 428 of 15 June 1904. The town became more important when the Grewestern railway reached it, now operated by the Rede Ferroviária Federal do Nordeste. At this time its name was changed to Igaci, the indigenous word for waterhole. Many cotton gins began operation to process the local harvest, although as of 2017 only one remained. Law No. 2087 of 27 December 1857 established Igaci as a separate municipality from Palmeira dos Índios effective 12 January 1959. It has a single district, Igaci.

== Demographics ==
The population in the 2010 census was 25,188. The estimated population as of 2020 was 25,613. Population density as of 2010 was 75.31 inhabitants per square kilometre (195.1/sq mi). As of 2010, 94.3% of the population had attended school between the ages of 6 and 14. Also as of 2010, the municipal Human Development Index was 0.564. This compares to 0.241 in 1991 and 0.366 in 2000.

On the 2010 census religion was reported as Catholic by 23,131 people, Evangelical by 1,156 people and Animism by 0 people.

The municipality has two main festivities: Political Emancipation Day and the festival of the patron saint Nossa Senhora da Saúde.

== Economy ==
In 2017, the average monthly salary was 1.8 minimum wages. Employed people were 5.0% of the total population. Households with monthly income of up to half a minimum wage per person represent 54.3% of the population. Recent estimates of GDP per capita:

== Health and sanitation ==
6.2% of households have adequate sanitation, 94.3% of urban households are on public roads with afforestation and 9.4% of urban households are on public roads with adequate urbanization (presence of manhole, sidewalk, pavement and curb). Annual hospitalizations due to diarrhea are 1.4 per 1,000 inhabitants. Deaths per 1,000 live births:

- 2006: 25.35
- 2007: 13.36
- 2008: 14.80
- 2009: 18.82
- 2010: 23.58
- 2011: 14.35
- 2012: 11.94
- 2013: 15.63
- 2014: 16.13
- 2015: 8.70
- 2016: 15.24
- 2017: 17.86

== Municipal finances ==
Recent figures for committed municipal expenditure:

Recent figures for realized municipal revenue:

== Sources ==
- Brasil / Alagoas / Igaci, IBGE
- História (in Portuguese), IBGE
- "Igaci", Geonames
- Igaci code:2703106, Brazilian Institute of Geography and Statistics
- "Igaci, Igaci, Alagoas, Brazil", Mindat
- NASA Earth Observations Data Set Index, NASA, archived from the original on 7 April 2019
- NASA Earth Observations: Rainfall (1 month - TRMM), NASA/Tropical Rainfall Monitoring Mission, archived from the original on 19 April 2019
