= Centro Esportivo Olhodagüense =

CEO
- Full name: Centro Esportivo Olhodagüense
- Nickname(s): CEO; Centro do Universo
- Founded: 2 December 1953; 71 years ago
- Ground: Estádio Edson Matias
- Capacity: 3,000
- League: Campeonato Alagoano Segunda Divisão
- 2021: Alagoano, 9th of 9 (relegated)
Home colors	Away colors

Centro Esportivo Olhodagüense, commonly known as CEO, is a Brazilian professional football club based in Olho d'Água das Flores, Alagoas. It competes in the Campeonato Alagoano Segunda Divisão, the second division of the Alagoas state football league.

== History ==
The club was founded on 2 December 1953. They won the Campeonato Alagoano Second Level in 2011, after beating Penedense in the final and thus they were promoted to the 2012 Campeonato Alagoano.

== Recent Season Records ==
Season	Division	First Stage	Second Stage	Overall
2008	2nd	-	-	Semifinals
2009–10	-	-	-	
2011	2nd	-	-	Champions (2nd division)
2012	1st	10th	6th	8th

== Achievements ==
- Campeonato Alagoano Second Level:
  - Winners (2): 2011, 2016

== Stadium ==
Centro Esportivo Olhodagüense play their home games at Estádio Edson Matias. The stadium has a maximum capacity of 3,000 people.
