= FF Sport Atalaiense =

Brazilian football club

Sport Nova Cruz
- Full name: FF Sport Nova Cruz
- Nickname(s): Canário de Alagoas
- Founded: 6 June 1965; 59 years ago
- Ground: Teotônio Vilela
- Capacity: 10,000
- League: Campeonato Alagoano Segunda Divisão
- 2021: Alagoano 2ª Divisão, 4th of 7
Home colours	Away colours

FF Sport Nova Cruz is a Brazilian football club based in Atalaia, Alagoas. It competes in the Campeonato Alagoano Segunda Divisão, the second division of the Alagoas state football league.

Founded as Sport Club Comercial in Viçosa on 6 June 1965, their uniform originally was a yellow jersey with green details, blue shorts, and white socks with yellow and green stripes, similar to Brazil's strip. The teams mascot is a canary and their stadium is Teotônio Vilela, which as a capacity of 10,000.

== History ==
Founded in 1965 as Comercial Futebol Clube, the club changed name to Futebol Clube Comercial de Viçosa in 2012. In May 2021, after a partnership with FF Sport, the club again changed name to Sport Club Comercial.
