= Boca da Mata =

Municipality in Alagoas, Brazil

- Municipality of Alagoas, Brazil
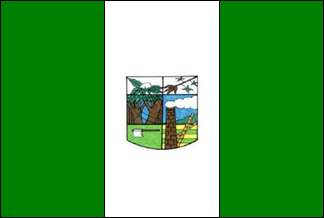
- Flag
- Etymology: In English "Mouth of the Forest", due to the first residences of the municipality being built at the entrance to a forest
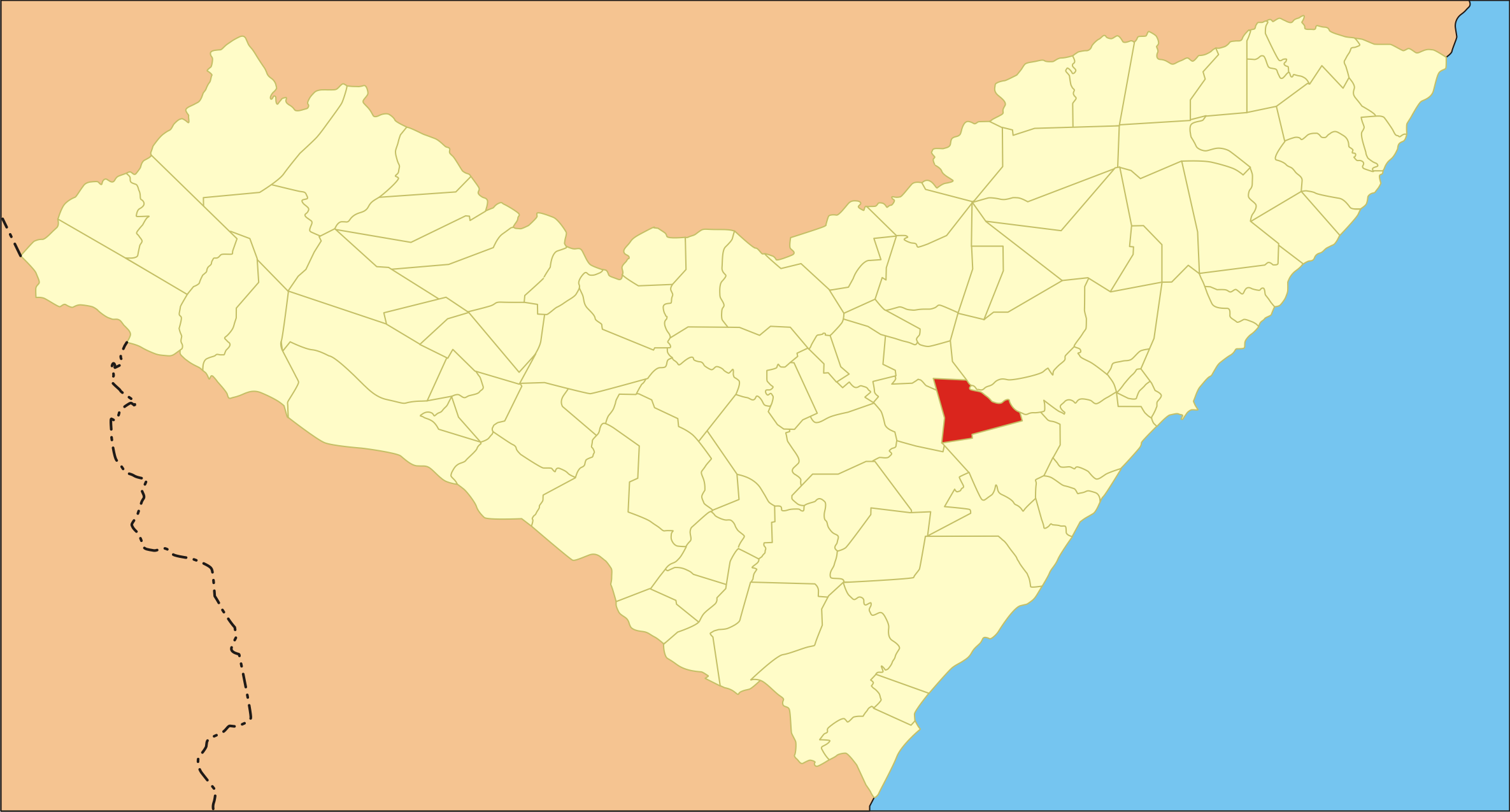
- Location of Boca da Mata in Alagoas

- Location within Brazil Location within South America
- Coordinates: 9°38′35″S 36°13′5″W
- Country: Brazil
- Region: Northeast
- State: Alagoas
- Founded: 11 November 1958

Government
  - Mayor: Bruno Feijó Teixeira (PP) (2025-2028)
  - Vice Mayor: Sergio Maciel da Costa (UNIÃO) (2025-2028)

Area
  - Total: 193.002 km^{2} (74.518 sq mi)
- Elevation: 132 m (433 ft)

Population (2022)
  - Total: 21,187
  - Density: 109.78/km^{2} (284.3/sq mi)
- Demonym: Matense (Brazilian Portuguese)
- Time zone: UTC-03:00 (Brasília Time)
- Postal code: 57680-000
- HDI (2010): 0.604 – medium
- Website: bocadamata.al.gov.br

Boca da Mata (Central northeastern portuguese pronunciation: [ˈbokɐ ˈdɐ ˈmata]) is a municipality located in the center of the Brazilian state of Alagoas. Its population is 27,356 (2020) and its area is 187 km^{2}.

== See also ==
- List of municipalities in Alagoas
