= Sport Club Penedense =

Penedense
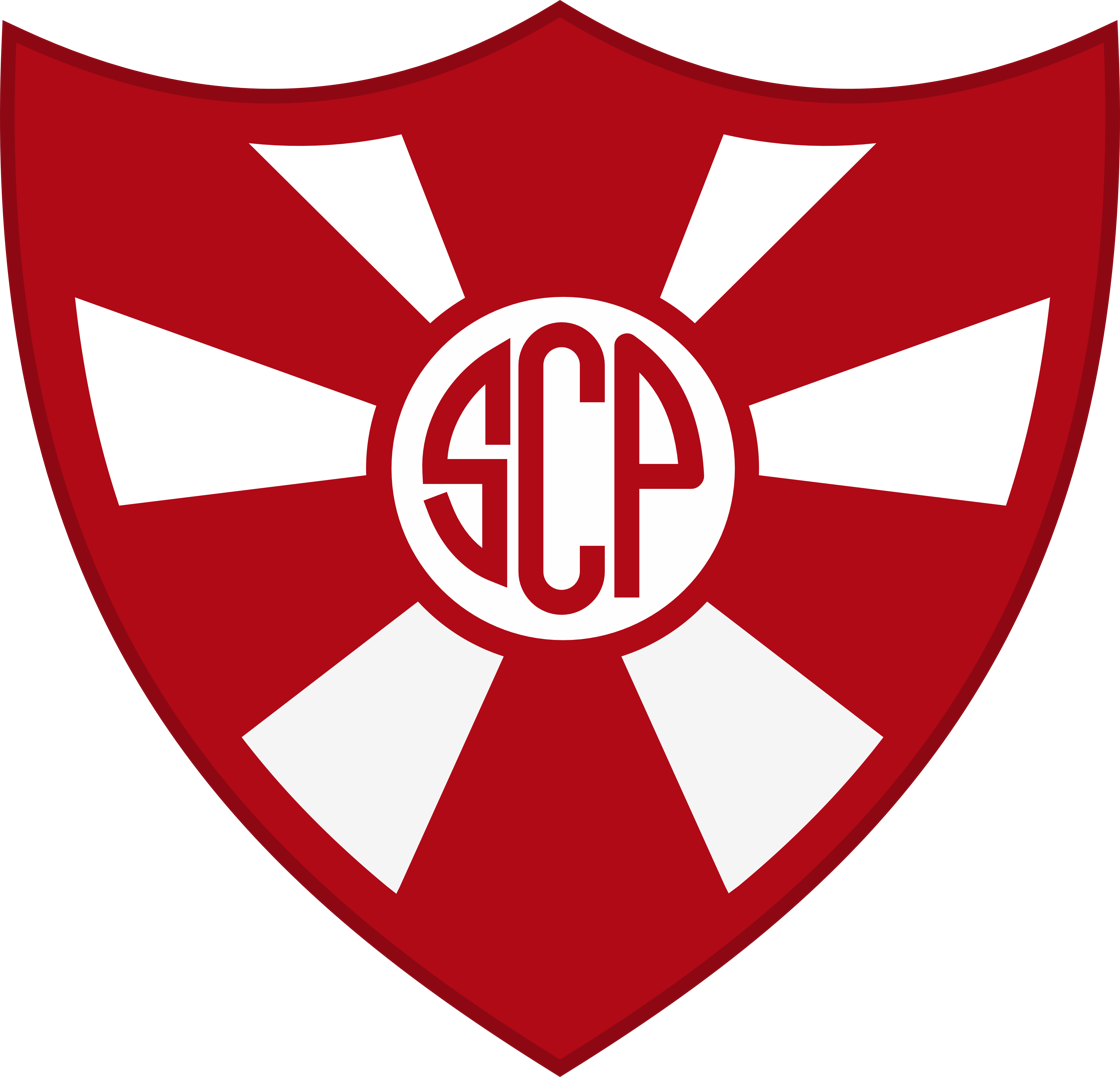
- Full name: Sport Club Penedense
- Nicknames: Alvirrubro Ribeirinho; Time do Velho Chico; Centenário das Alagoas; Ribeirinho de Penedo; Alvirrubro do Cajueiro Grande
- Founded: 3 January 1909; 117 years ago
- Ground: Estádio Alfredo Leahy
- Capacity: 6,000
- League: Campeonato Alagoano
- 2025 2025: Série D, 62nd of 64; Alagoano, 4th of 8
Home colors	Away colors

Sport Club Penedense is a Brazilian football club based in Penedo, Alagoas. The senior team currently competes in the Campeonato Alagoano, and the Campeonato Brasileiro Série D.

== History ==
The club was founded on 3 January 1909. Penedense won the Campeonato Alagoano Second Level in 2000 and in 2004. They finished in the second position in the Campeonato Alagoano Second Level in 2011, losing the competition to CEO and thus they were promoted to the 2012 Campeonato Alagoano.

== Honours ==
- Campeonato Alagoano Second Division
  - Winners (3): 2000, 2004, 2023
- Torneio Início de Alagoas
  - Winners (5): 1964, 1967, 1969, 1971, 1978

== Stadium ==
Sport Club Penedense play their home games at Estádio Alfredo Leahy. The stadium has a maximum capacity of 6,000 people.
