= Capela, Alagoas =

Municipality in Alagoas, Brazil

Capela
- Municipality of Alagoas, Brazil
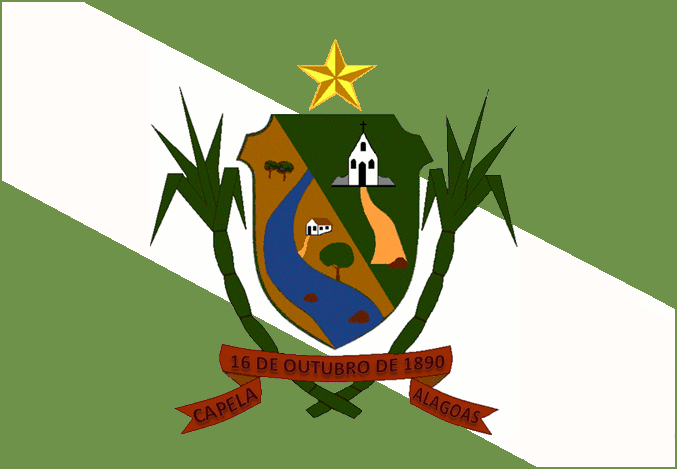
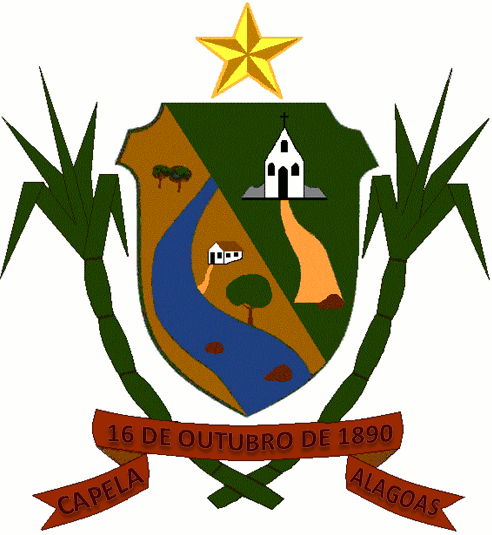
- Flag Coat of arms

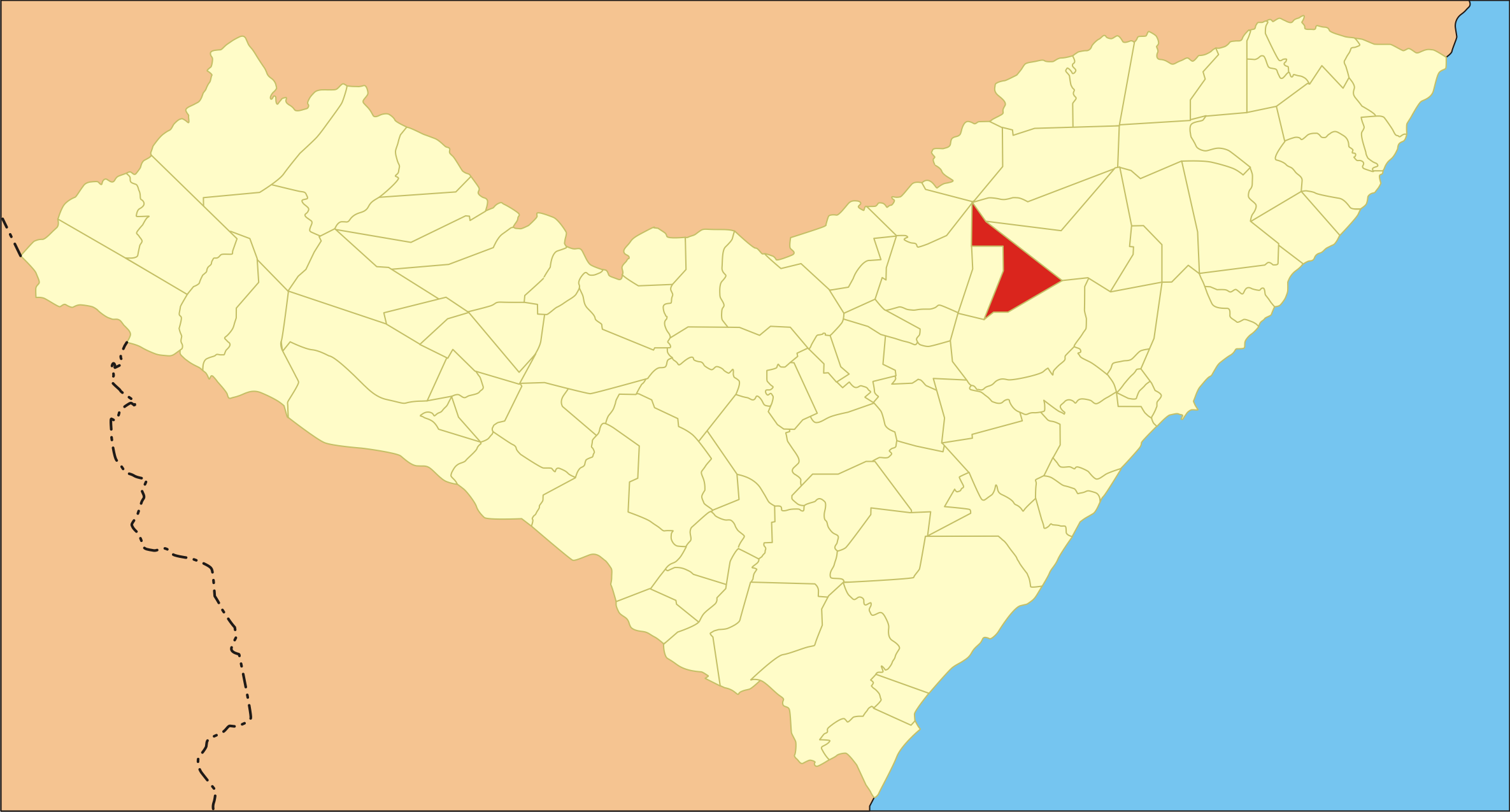
- Location of Capela in Alagoas

- Location within Brazil Location within South America
- Coordinates: 9°24′37″S 36°4′50″W
- Country: Brazil
- Region: Northeast
- State: Alagoas
- Founded: 16 October 1890

Government
  - Mayor: Thiago de Medeiros Moura (MDB) (2025-2028)
  - Vice Mayor: Anibal Soriano Moreira (PP) (2025-2028)

Area
  - Total: 263.735 km^{2} (101.829 sq mi)
- Elevation: 84 m (276 ft)

Population (2022)
  - Total: 15,032
  - Density: 57/km^{2} (150/sq mi)
- Demonym: Capelense (Brazilian Portuguese)
- Time zone: UTC-03:00 (Brasília Time)
- Postal code: 57780-000, 57790-000
- HDI (2010): 0.569 – medium
- Website: capela.al.gov.br

Capela (Central northeastern portuguese pronunciation: [kaˈpɛlɐ]) is a municipality located in the Brazilian state of Alagoas. Its population is 16,979 (2020) and its area is 205 km^{2} (79 sq mi).

== See also ==
- List of municipalities in Alagoas
