= Clube Sociedade Esportiva =

Brazilian association football club

CSE
- Full name: Clube Sociedade Esportiva
- Nickname: Tricolorido Palmeirense
- Founded: 21 June 1947; 79 years ago
- Ground: Estádio Juca Sampaio
- Capacity: 8,000
- Head Coach: Cemal Sergen Ergen
- League: Campeonato Brasileiro Série D Campeonato Alagoano
- 2025: Alagoano, 7th of 8
Home colours	Away colours

Clube Sociedade Esportiva (CSE) is a Brazilian professional football club based in Palmeira dos Índios, Alagoas. It competes in the Série D, the fourth tier of Brazilian football, as well as in the Campeonato Alagoano, the top flight of the Alagoas state football league.

The club was formerly known as Centro Social Esportivo.

== History ==
The club was founded on 21 June 1947, as Centro Social Esportivo. The club was renamed Clube Sociedade Esportiva on 7 May 1997, as a way to get rid of the debts with the Federal Government and other creditors. CSE won the Campeonato Alagoano Second Level in 2002.

== Honours ==
- Copa Alagoas
  - Winners (2): 2023, 2025
- Campeonato Alagoano Second Level
  - Winners (2): 2002, 2019

== Stadium ==
Clube Sociedade Esportiva play their home games at Estádio Juca Sampaio. The stadium has a maximum capacity of 8,000 people.
