= Coruripe =

Municipality of Alagoas, Brazil

- Municipality
- The Municipality of Coruripe

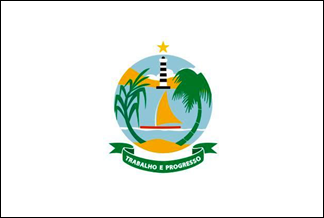
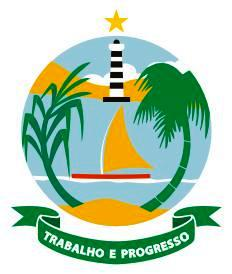
- Flag Seal
- Nickname: "Land of the Caetés"
- Motto: "Trabalho e Progresso" ("Work and Progress")
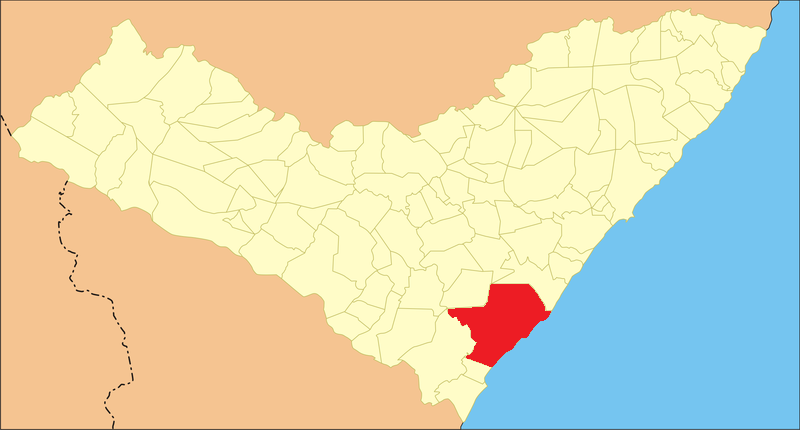
- Location of Coruripe in the State of Alagoas
- Coordinates: 10°07′33″S 36°10′33″W
- Country: Brazil
- State: Alagoas
- Mesoregion: Leste Alagoano
- Microregion: São Miguel dos Campos
- Founded: 1850

Government
  - Mayor: Marx Beltrão Lima Siqueira (PMDB)

Area
  - Total: 912.716 km^{2} (352.402 sq mi)
- Elevation: 16 m (52 ft)

Population (2020)
  - Total: 57,294
  - Density: 62.773/km^{2} (162.58/sq mi)
- Demonym: Coruripense
- Time zone: UTC−3 (BRT)
- Area code: +55 82
- HDI (2000): 0.665 – medium
- Website: Official website

Coruripe (Central northeastern portuguese pronunciation: [kʊɾʊˈɾipi]) is a municipality located in the southern coast of the Brazilian state of Alagoas. Its population is 57,294 (2020) and its area is 913 km^{2}. It is the largest municipality in Alagoas by area, but among the largest municipalities of each Brazilian state, it is the smallest. It is situated at the edge of Coruripe river.

== Notable people ==
- Yolanda Beltrão de Azevedo (born 1911), supercentenarian and the oldest living person in Brazil
- Maurício Ruffy, mixed martial artist, UFC lightweight contender
