= Murici FC =

Murici F.C.
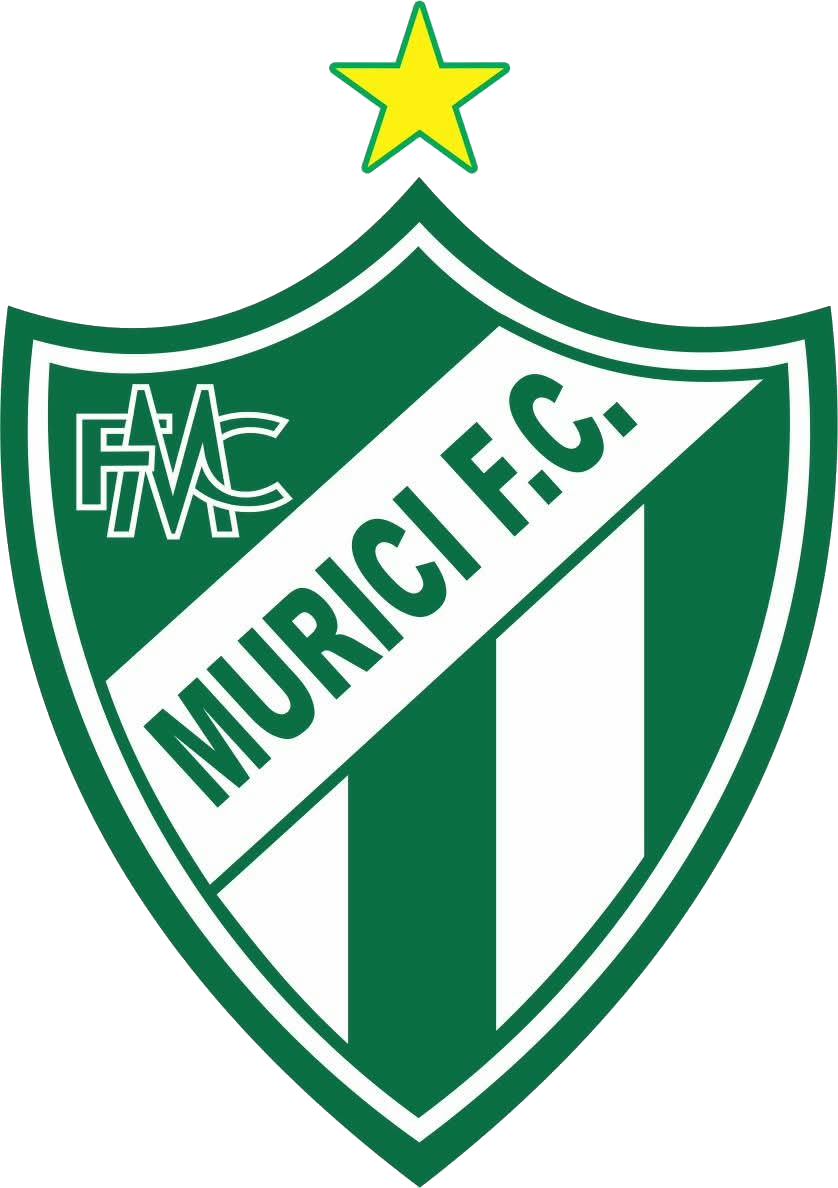
- Full name: Murici Futebol Clube
- Nicknames: Verdão'(Big Green)’ Alvi-verde
- Founded: 7 September 1974; 51 years ago
- Ground: Estádio José Gomes da Costa
- Capacity: 3,829
- President: Olavo Neto
- Head coach: Celso Teixeira
- League: Campeonato Alagoano
- 2022: Alagoano, 4th of 8
Home colours	Away colours

Murici Futebol Clube is a Brazilian professional football club based in Murici, Alagoas.

== History ==
The club was founded on 7 September 1974. Murici won the Campeonato Alagoano once, in 2010.

In November 2025, after being penalized with a transfer ban and citing serious financial difficulties, the club withdrew from the state championship, opening a spot for the runner-up of the second division, Guarany Alagoano from Maceió. However, Guarany was invited by authorities from the city of Murici to replace Murici FC, changing its name to Murici Sport Clube. The clubs are therefore different entities.

== Honours ==
- Campeonato Alagoano
  - Winners (1): 2010
- Campeonato Alagoano Second Division
  - Winners (1): 1998
- Copa Alagoas
  - Winners (1): 2014

== Stadium ==
Murici Futebol Clube play their home games at Estádio José Gomes da Costa. The stadium has a maximum capacity of 3,000 people.
