= Centro Sportivo Alagoano =

Association football club

CSA
- Full name: Centro Sportivo Alagoano
- Nicknames: Azulão do Mutange (Mutange's Big Blue); Azulão das Alagoas (Alagoas' Big Blue); Alviceleste (The White & Blue); Papão de Títulos (Boogeyman of Titles); Orgulho Alagoano (Alagoas' Pride); Todo Poderoso (The Almighty)
- Founded: 7 September 1913; 113 years ago
- Ground: Rei Pelé
- Capacity: 19,105
- Chairman: Mirian Monte
- Head coach: Itamar Schülle
- League: Campeonato Brasileiro Série D Campeonato Alagoano
- 2025 2025: Série C, 17th of 20 (relegated); Alagoano, 3rd of 8
- Website: www.csaoficial.com.br
Home colours	Away colours	Third colours

Centro Sportivo Alagoano, commonly referred to by its initials CSA, is a Brazilian professional football club based in Maceió, Alagoas. It competes in Série D, the fourth tier of Brazilian football, and the Campeonato Alagoano, the top flight of the Alagoas state football league. The team play their home matches at the 20,000 seat Estádio Rei Pelé alongside their rivals Clube de Regatas Brasil.

Founded on 7 September 1913, CSA has won a record forty Campeonato Alagoano titles, most recently in 2021, and 2 Copa Alagoas titles. They also finished as the runners-up of the 1999 Copa CONMEBOL, losing in the final to Talleres.

== History ==
Centro Sportivo Alagoano was founded on 7 September 1913, as Centro Sportivo Sete de Setembro. Originally a multi-sport club, CSA played its first football match in 1915 against a group of students living in Recife, winning 3-0. In 1914, the club changed its name in honor of Floriano Peixoto, the second president of Brazil and hero of the Paraguayan War. Four years later, in 1918, the club was renamed Centro Sportivo Alagoano, its current name.

== Players ==
=== First team squad ===
As of 30 of August 2024

Note: Flags indicate national team as defined under FIFA eligibility rules; some limited exceptions apply. Players may hold more than one non-FIFA nationality.

No.	Pos.	Nation	Player
—	DF	BRA	Matheus Santos
—	GK	BRA	Fintelman
—	GK	BRA	Paulo Ricardo
—	DF	BRA	Arnaldo
—	DF	BRA	Celsinho
—	DF	BRA	Erik
—	DF	BRA	Kevin (on loan from Audax)
—	DF	BRA	Lucas Ryan (on loan from Internacional)
—	DF	BRA	Paulo César
—	DF	BRA	Everton Silva
—	DF	BRA	Alex Trindade (on loan from Cianorte)
—	MF	BRA	Caio Vitor (on loan from Volta Redonda)

No.	Pos.	Nation	Player
—	MF	BRA	Luan Gonçalves (on loan from Primavera)
—	MF	BRA	Marciel
—	MF	BRA	Guilherme Rend (on loan from Jacuipense)
—	MF	BRA	Rhayner (on loan from Tombense)
—	MF	BRA	Moisés Ribeiro
—	MF	BRA	Rodolfo
—	MF	BRA	Yago
—	FW	BRA	Abner (on loan from Fluminense)
—	FW	BRA	Gustavo Xuxa
—	FW	BRA	Robinho
—	FW	COL	Ray Vanegas
—	FW	BRA	Ruan

=== Out on loan ===
Note: Flags indicate national team as defined under FIFA eligibility rules; some limited exceptions apply. Players may hold more than one non-FIFA nationality.

No.	Pos.	Nation	Player
—	DF	BRA	Almir Luan (at Internacional de Lages until 31 December 2023)

=== Notable former players and staff ===
In 1976, Fernando Collor de Mello, who later was elected president of Brazil, was the club's chairman. Brazilian singer Djavan played for CSA as a midfielder before he decided to become a singer.

== Honours ==
=== Official tournaments ===
National
Competitions	Titles	Seasons
Campeonato Brasileiro Série C	1	2017
Inter-state
Competitions	Titles	Seasons
Copa Alagoas - Sergipe	1	1967
State
Competitions	Titles	Seasons
Campeonato Alagoano	40	1928, 1929, 1933, 1935, 1936, 1941, 1942, 1944, 1949, 1952, 1955, 1956, 1957, 1958, 1960, 1963, 1965, 1966, 1967, 1968, 1971, 1974, 1975, 1980, 1981, 1982, 1984, 1985, 1988, 1990, 1991, 1994, 1996, 1997, 1998, 1999, 2008, 2018, 2019, 2021
Copa Alagoas	3	2006, 2024, 2026
Campeonato Alagoano Second Division	2	2005, 2010

- record

=== Others tournaments ===
==== State ====
- Torneio Início de Alagoas (15): 1927, 1928, 1929, 1930, 1933, 1935, 1940, 1942, 1946, 1949, 1957, 1961, 1965, 1972, 1979

=== Runners-up ===
- Copa CONMEBOL (1): 1999
- Campeonato Brasileiro Série B (4): 1980, 1982, 1983, 2018
- Campeonato Brasileiro Série D (1): 2016
- Campeonato Alagoano (25): 1927, 1930, 1938, 1939, 1940, 1950, 1964, 1969, 1972, 1973, 1976, 1978. 1983, 1986, 1989, 1993, 1995, 2000, 2001, 2002, 2006, 2013, 2016, 2017, 2020
- Copa Alagoas (1): 2015

== Symbols ==
The club's motto, União e Força, displayed in the logo, means Union and Strength. CSA's mascot is called Azulão, a type of bird.

== 1999 Copa CONMEBOL ==
The club competed in Copa CONMEBOL in 1999, and played the following matches:

First Stage

CSA – (Brazil) Vila Nova 2–0; 0–2 (pens: 4–3)

Second Stage

(Venezuela) Estudiantes de Mérida – CSA 0–0; 1–3

Semi-Finals

(Brazil) São Raimundo – CSA 1–0; 1–2 (pens: 4–5)

Final

CSA – (Argentina) Talleres de Córdoba 4–2; 0–3
