= Campeonato Alagoano =

Football league in Alagoas, Brazil

- Organising body: FAF
- Founded: 1918; 108 years ago
- Country: Brazil
- State: Alagoas
- Divisions: 2
- Level on pyramid: 1
- Relegation to: Campeonato Alagoano Second Division
- Domestic cup: Copa do Brasil
- Current champions: CRB (45th title) (2026)
- Most championships: CRB (45 titles)
- Website: FAF Official website

The Campeonato Alagoano is the top-flight professional state football league in the Brazilian state of Alagoas. It is run by the Alagoas Football Federation (FAF).

== List of champions ==
Season	Champions	Runners-up
1918	CRB (1)	???
1919	CRB (2)	Eleven Nacional
1920	CRB (3)	W/O
1921	CRB (4)	Ypiranga
1922	CRB (5)	not held
1923	CRB (6)	Eleven Nacional
1924	CRB (7)	Ypiranga
1925	CRB (8)	Vera Cruz
1926	CRB (9)	Barroso
1927	CRB (10)	CSA
1928	CSA (1)	CRB
1929	CSA (2)	Vera Cruz
1930	CRB (11)	CSA
1931–1932	Not held	
1933	CSA (3)	Nordeste
1934	Not held	
1935	CSA (4)	Associação Militar
1936	CSA (5)	Nordeste
1937	CRB (12)	Nordeste
1938	CRB (13)	CSA
1939	CRB (14)	CSA
1940	CRB (15)	CSA
1941	CSA (6)	CRB
1942	CSA (7)	CRB
1943	Not finished	
1944	CSA (8)	CRB
1945	Santa Cruz (1)	América
1946	Barroso (1)	CRB
1947	Alexandria (1)	Barroso
1948	Santa Cruz (2)	CRB
1949	CSA (9)	CRB
1950	CRB (16)	Barroso
1951	CRB (17)	Ferroviário
1952	CSA (10)	Ferroviário
1953	ASA (1)	Ferroviário (Note: Ferroviário refused to play the final against ASA, and the latter team was declared champions by the FAF)
1954	Ferroviário (1)	29 de Setembro
1955	CSA (11)	Ferroviário
1956	CSA (12)	Ferroviário
1957	CSA (13)	ASA
1958	CSA (14)	CRB
1959	Capelense (1)	CRB
1960	CSA (15)	Capelense
1961	CRB (18)	Capelense
1962	Capelense (2)	Estivadores
1963	CSA (16)	CRB
1964	CRB (19)	CSA
1965	CSA (17)	Capelense
1966	CSA (18)	Penedense
1967	CSA (19)	ASA
1968	CSA (20)	CRB
1969	CRB (20)	CSA
1970	CRB (21)	ASA
1971	CSA (21)	CRB
1972	CRB (22)	CSA
1973	CRB (23)	CSA
1974	CSA (22)	CRB
1975	CSA (23)	CRB
1976	CRB (24)	CSA
1977	CRB (25)	CSE
1978	CRB (26)	CSA
1979	CRB (27)	ASA
1980	CSA (24)	CRB
1981	CSA (25)	CRB
1982	CSA (26)	CRB
1983	CRB (28)	CSA
1984	CSA (27)	CRB
1985	CSA (28)	CRB
1986	CRB (29)	CSA
1987	CRB (30)	CSE
1988	CSA (29)	São Domingos
1989	Capelense (3)	CSA
1990	CSA (30)	Comercial
1991	CSA (31)	ASA
1992	CRB (31)	Ipanema
1993	CRB (32)	CSA
1994	CSA (32)	CRB
1995	CRB (33)	CSA
1996	CSA (33)	CRB
1997	CSA (34)	CRB
1998	CSA (35)	CRB
1999	CSA (36)	Miguelense
2000	ASA (2)	CSA
2001	ASA (3)	CSA
2002	CRB (34)	CSA
2003	ASA (4)	CRB
2004	Corinthians (1)	Coruripe
2005	ASA (5)	Coruripe
2006	Coruripe (1)	CSA
2007	Coruripe (2)	Corinthians
2008	CSA (37)	ASA
2009	ASA (6)	Corinthians
2010	Murici (1)	ASA
2011	ASA (7)	Coruripe
2012	CRB (35)	ASA
2013	CRB (36)	CSA
2014	Coruripe (3)	CRB
2015	CRB (37)	CSA
2016	CRB (38)	CSA
2017	CRB (39)	CSA
2018	CSA (38)	CRB
2019	CSA (39)	CRB
2020	CRB (40)	CSA
2021	CSA (40)	CRB
2022	CRB (41)	ASA
2023	CRB (42)	ASA
2024	CRB (43)	ASA
2025	CRB (44)	ASA
2026	CRB (45)	ASA

== Titles by team ==
Teams in bold stills active.

Rank	Club	Winners	Winning years
1	**CRB**	45	1918, 1919, 1920, 1921, 1922, 1923, 1924, 1925, 1926, 1927, 1930, 1937, 1938, 1939, 1940, 1950, 1951, 1961, 1964, 1969, 1970, 1972, 1973, 1976, 1977, 1978, 1979, 1983, 1986, 1987, 1992, 1993, 1995, 2002, 2012, 2013, 2015, 2016, 2017, 2020, 2022, 2023, 2024, 2025, 2026
2	**CSA**	40	1928, 1929, 1933, 1935, 1936, 1941, 1942, 1944, 1949, 1952, 1955, 1956, 1957, 1958, 1960, 1963, 1965, 1966, 1967, 1968, 1971, 1974, 1975, 1980, 1981, 1982, 1984, 1985, 1988, 1990, 1991, 1994, 1996, 1997, 1998, 1999, 2008, 2018, 2019, 2021
3	**ASA**	7	1953, 2000, 2001, 2003, 2005, 2009, 2011
4	Capelense	3	1959, 1962, 1989
4	**Coruripe**	3	2006, 2007, 2014
6	Santa Cruz	2	1945, 1948
7	Alexandria	1	1947
7	Barroso	1	1946
7	Corinthians	1	2004
7	Ferroviário	1	1954
7	**Murici**	1	2010

=== By city ===
City	Championships	Clubs
Maceió	91	CRB (45), CSA (40), Santa Cruz (2), Alexandria (1), Barroso (1), Corinthians (1), Ferroviário (1)
Arapiraca	7	ASA (7)
Capela	3	Capelense (3)
Coruripe	3	Coruripe (3)
Murici	1	Murici (1)
