= Raniere (footballer) =

Brazilian footballer (born 1980)

Personal information
- Full name: Raniere Silva dos Santos
- Date of birth: 16 August 1980 (age 46)
- Place of birth: Itanhém, Brazil
- Height: 1.89 m (6 ft 2 1/2 in)
- Position: Goalkeeper

Team information
- Current team: Blue Boys Muhlenbach

Senior career*
Years	Team	Apps	(Gls)
2001–2002	América (MG)	8	(0)
- ?
2004–2005	Sampaio Corrêa	?	(?)
2005–2006	América (RN)	1	(0)
2007	CRB	NA	(NA)
2007–2009	ABC	49	(0)
2010–2011	Ipatinga	1	(0)
2011–2012	Nacional (MG)		
2013	Sampaio Corrêa	0	(0)
2014	Maranhão	11	(0)
2014–2015	Moto Club	19	(0)
2015	Imperatriz	8	(0)
2016–2017	Maranhão	5	(0)
2017–	Blue Boys Muhlenbach		

International career
1997	Brazil U17		
- * Club domestic league appearances and goals as of 16 March 2014

Raniere Silva dos Santos (born 16 August 1980) is a Brazilian footballer who plays as a goalkeeper for Blue Boys Muhlenbach.

== Club career ==
Born in Itanhém, Bahia, Raniere started his career with Minas Gerais side América de Belo Horizonte, which he played 8 matches in 2001 Campeonato Brasileiro Série A and 2 matches in 2002 Copa do Brasil.

In 2004, he left for Sampaio Corrêa for Taça Cidade de São Luís, 2004 Copa do Brasil, 2004 Campeonato Brasileiro Série C and Campeonato Maranhense.

Raniere extended his contract with Sampaio Corrêa in January 2005 for another year. He played for the club at 2005 Copa do Brasil in national level.

=== América de Natal ===
In June 2005 he left for América de Natal for 2005 Campeonato Brasileiro Série C. That season he was the backup of Fabiano and the team finished as Série C runner and promoted.

In January 2006, he signed a 1-year extension with América de Natal for Campeonato Potiguar and 2006 Campeonato Brasileiro Série B. He played once in round 5 (5 September 2006) as the captain Fabiano played almost all the season.

=== CRB ===
In January 2007, he signed an annual contract with Alagoas side CRB. He left the club before the start of 2007 Campeonato Brasileiro Série B and at the middle of 2007 Campeonato Alagoano.

He left the club in March 2007, the club also later signed Ricardo Vilar, Veloso and Jeferson.

=== ABC ===
Raniere returned to Natal, state capital of Rio Grande do Norte for ABC in March 2007 (which last signed a new deal in June) as first choice keeper at 2007 Campeonato Brasileiro Série C, ahead Fábio Noronha, Aloísio, Diego and Gleibson. He only missed 2 match (in second stage and third stage), both the last and 6th match of that stage. Both matches Aloísio as first choice and Diego as backup.

ABC reached the last and fourth stage, overall finished as the fourth of Série C and promoted to Série B. He played 30 out of possible 32 matches that season.

Raniere remained as first choice at 2008 Copa do Brasil. But at the opening match of 2008 Campeonato Brasileiro Série B, he was the understudy of Paulo Musse and lost the place in bench to Aloísio in the next match and competed for the bench position with Aloísio in the ongoing season. In Round 21, (26 August 2008), Raniere regained his starting position and played his last match of the season on 27 September (round 28). In round 29 Paulo Musse returned as first choice and played rest of the fixture (round 29 to 38).

In 2009 season, Raniere started again in 2009 Copa do Brasil, ahead Tiago Cardoso and Wellington. But on the opening match and the 2nd match of 2009 Campeonato Brasileiro Série B, Tiago Cardoso was the first choice and Raniere as backup, both ABC losing the matches. Raniere started in the round 3 & 4 and in round 5 Paulo Musse available to team again.

Paulo Musse was not call-up in round 12 and played by Tiago Cardoso, again a losing match. On round 17, (11 August 2009) Paulo Musse was not call up again, this time Raniere as the first choice. He played 5 successive matches (round 17 to 21), which the team only win in round 20, on 25 August 2009. Raniere then lost his place to Tiago Cardos, which Raniere only played round 23, 36 to 38. Overall, he played 11 matches for ABC in national league that season, and the team finished as the bottom and relegated.

=== Ipatinga ===
In 2010, Raniere returned to Minas Gerais, signed a 1-year contract with Ipatinga, as understudy of Douglas. He played twice in Campeonato Mineiro, the opening and closing match (round 11) of the stage one. He played once in 2010 Campeonato Brasileiro Série B in round 11 (on 31 July 2010), as Douglas was suspended. (as of 26 August 2010)

== International career ==
Raniere was called up to 1997 FIFA U-17 World Championship, as understudy of Fábio.

== Honours ==
=== Club ===
América (MG)

- Campeonato Mineiro: 2001

ABC

- Campeonato Potiguar: 2007, 2008 (ABC)

=== International ===
Brazil

- FIFA U-17 World Championship: 1997
