= Jéferson (footballer, born 1986) =

Brazilian footballer

Personal information
- Full name: Jéferson Gomes do Nascimento
- Date of birth: 9 January 1986 (age 40)
- Place of birth: Caratinga, Brazil
- Height: 1.82 m (5 ft 11 1/2 in)
- Position: Goalkeeper

Team information
- Current team: Treze

Youth career
- Atlético Mineiro

Senior career*
| Years | Team | Apps | (Gls) |
| 2006–2009 | Atlético Mineiro | 0 | (0) |
| 2007–2008 | → CRB (loan) | 22 | (0) |
| 2009 | → Villa Nova (loan) | 0 | (0) |
| 2009 | → CSA (loan) | 1 | (0) |
| 2010 | Tupi | 0 | (0) |
| 2010 | CSA | 1 | (0) |
| 2011 | Coruripe | 1 | (0) |
| 2012 | Sport Atalaia | 0 | (0) |
| 2012 | Santos-AP | 0 | (0) |
| 2013 | ASA | 0 | (0) |
| 2013–2014 | Santa Rita | 0 | (0) |
| 2015–2017 | CSA | 14 | (0) |
| 2015 | → Coruripe | 2 | (0) |
| 2018 | Campinense | 12 | (0) |
| 2019 | Central-PE | 0 | (0) |
| 2020– | Treze | 3 | (0) |
- * Club domestic league appearances and goals as of 20:15, 19 February 2021 (UTC)

Jéferson Gomes do Nascimento or simply Jéferson (born 9 January 1986), is a Brazilian footballer who plays for Treze.

== Biography ==
Born in Caratinga, Minas Gerais, Jéferson started his career with Atlético Mineiro. In April 2007 he left for CRB to replace Raniere. He was the first choice keeper ahead of Ricardo Vilar (also a new signing), he then competed the starting place with Veloso (yet another new signing) and lost his place to Paulo Musse after round 25, a month after Paulo Musse was signed. The loan was extended in January 2008, however he became the third keeper, behind Jonatas Cunegatto and Fernando Wellington Oliveira de Mendonca.

In 2009 season he was loaned to Villa Nova, as the backup keeper for Macaé. On 30 March 2009 he returned to Campeonato Alagoano for CSA, CRB's city rival, where he was immediately first choice keeper ahead of Gilberto. However, he lost his starting place to Heverton for 2009 Campeonato Brasileiro Série C.

In the 2010 season he moved to Tupi, as understudy of Eládio for 2010 Campeonato Mineiro. He made his debut as a substitute for striker Ademilson in the 49th minute after Eládio was sent off in round 7, and made his first start in round 8.

On 1 July 2010, he returned to CSA, as Anderson Paraíba's backup. He made his first start in the last group stage match, as the team already qualified to the next stage. He also played in 2010 Campeonato Alagoano Segunda Divisão, playing 5 matches, including semi-finals and finals. In 2010 Campeonato do Nordeste, he played the last round of the group stage and played in the semi-final, losing to Vitória.

In December 2010, Jéferson and Anderson renewed their contract until the end of 2011 Campeonato Alagoano. He moved to Coruripe for 2011 Campeonato Brasileiro Série D, where he made a single substitute appearance in the Round of 16 game against Santa Cruz.

He played for Sport Atalaia in 2012 Campeonato Alagoano, moving to Santos-AP for 2012 Campeonato Brasileiro Série D, where he was an unused substitute for all eight games.

At the start of the 2013 season he signed for ASA and was an unused substitute in games in 2013 Copa do Brasil, 2013 Copa do Nordeste and the hexagonal stage of 2013 Campeonato Alagoano. He moved to Santa Rita and played in the title-winning team in the second division of the 2013 Campeonato Alagano. He stayed with Santa Rita in 2014, playing all twenty games in 2014 Campeonato Alagoano and all eight games in the clubs 2014 Copa do Brasil run.

In 2015 he signed again for CSA, where he was voted best player in his position in 2015 Campeonato Alagoano. he joined Coruripe for the 2015 Campeonato Brasileiro Série D, and returned to CSA for the 2016 season. He helped the club to win promotion form 2016 Campeonato Brasileiro Série D and was signed up to remain there in 2018.

At the end of 2017 Jéferson joined Campinense, playing in 2018 Campeonato Paraibano, 2018 Campeonato Brasileiro Série D and the pre-qualifying games for 2019 Copa do Nordeste. He moved on to Central-PE for 2019 Campeonato Pernambucano, also playing in 2019 Copa do Brasil.

Jéferson signed with Treze at the end of 2019.

== Career statistics ==
As of Match played 5 December 2020.

| Brazil | | | National League | | Copa do Brasil | | State League | | Other | | Total | |
| Season | Club | League | Apps | Goals | Apps | Goals | Apps | Goals | Apps | Goals | Apps | Goals |
|---|---|---|---|---|---|---|---|---|---|---|---|---|
| 2007 | CRB | Série B | 16 | 0 | — | | ? (Note: Appearance statistics for 2007 Campeonato Alagoano are unavailable) | ? | 0 | 0 | 16 | 0 |
| 2008 | CRB | Série B | 6 | 0 | — | | ? (Note: Appearance statistics for 2008 Campeonato Alagoano are unavailable) | ? | 0 | 0 | 6 | 0 |
| 2009 | CSA | Série D | 1 | 0 | 2 | 0 | 6 | 0 | 5 | 0 | 11 | 0 |
| 2010 | Tupi | Mineiro | — | | — | | 2 | 0 | 0 | 0 | 2 | 0 |
| 2010 | CSA | Série D | 1 | 0 | — | | 5 | 0 | 2 (Note: Appearances in 2010 Copa do Nordeste.) | 0 | 8 | 0 |
| 2011 | Coruripe | Série D | 1 | 0 | — | | — | | — | | 1 | 0 |
| 2012 | Sport Atalaia | Alagoano | — | | — | | 1 | 0 | — | | 1 | 0 |
| 2013 | Santa Rita | Alagoano 2nd Division | — | | — | | ? (Note: Campeonato Alagoano 2nd Division appearance statistics unavailable) | ? | — | | ? | ? |
| 2014 | Santa Rita | Alagoano | — | | 8 | 0 | 20 | 0 | — | | 28 | 0 |
| 2015 | CSA | Alagoano | — | | — | | 21 | 0 | — | | 21 | 0 |
| 2016 | CSA | Série D | 14 | 0 | — | | 19 | 0 | — | | 33 | 0 |
| 2017 | CSA | Alagoano | — | | 1 | 0 | 7 | 0 | 4 (Note: Appearances in 2017 Copa do Nordeste.) | 0 | 12 | 0 |
| 2015 | Coruripe (loan) | Série D | 2 | 0 | — | | — | | — | | 2 | 0 |
| 2018 | Campinense | Série D | 12 | 0 | — | | 14 | 0 | 2 (Note: Appearance in pre-qualifying for 2019 Copa do Nordeste.) | 0 | 28 | 0 |
| 2019 | Central-PE | Pernambucano | — | | 1 | 0 | 9 | 0 | — | | 10 | 0 |
| 2020 | Treze | Série C | 3 | 0 | 14 | 0 | 0 | 0 | 0 | 0 | 17 | 0 |
| Career total | | | 56 | 0 | 26 | 0 | 104+ | 0 | 13 | 0 | 199+ | 0 |

== Honours ==
Coruripe

- Campeonato Alagoano Segunda Divisão: 2010

Santa Rita

- Campeonato Alagoano Segunda Divisão: 2013
