= 2013 Campeonato Alagoano =

Campeonato Alagoano de Futebol
- Season: 2013
- Champions: CRB
- Relegated: Sport Atalaia; União
- Copa do Brasil: CRB; CSA; CEO
- Série D: CSA
- Copa do Nordeste: CRB; CSA
- Matches: 98
- Goals: 261 (2.66 per match)
- Top goalscorer: Everaldo (CSA) - 13 goals

The 2013 Campeonato Alagoano de Futebol was the 83rd season of Alagoas's top professional football league. The competition began on January 12 and ended on May 19. CRB were the champions for the 27th time. Sport Atalaia and União were relegated.

== Format ==
In the first stage consists of a double round-robin format. The four teams who place the highest will qualify for the "Hexagonal". CRB and ASA are directly qualified for the "Hexagonal" as Copa do Nordeste participants. The best four teams of the "Hexagonal" advance to the playoffs. The worst four teams from the first stage will play in the Torneio da Morte, a relegation round where the two worst teams in this round will be relegated.

If CRB or ASA finished 6th they will play an extra relegation playoff will be held.

The best team which is not in Campeonato Brasileiro Série A, Série B or Série C will qualify to the 2013 Campeonato Brasileiro Série D. The three best teams qualifies to the 2014 Copa do Brasil.

== Participating teams ==
Club	Home city	2012 result
ASA	Arapiraca	2nd
C.E.O	Olho d'Água das Flores	8th
Comercial	Viçosa	1st (2nd division)
Corinthians Alagoano	Pilar	4th
CRB	Maceió	1st
CSA	Maceió	3rd
CSE	Palmeira dos Índios	7th
Murici	Murici	5th
Sport Atalaia	Atalaia	6th
União	União dos Palmares	2nd (2nd division)

== First round (first stage) ==
Pos	Team	Pld	W	D	L	GF	GA	GD	Pts	Qualification
1	Corinthians Alagoano (A)	14	7	3	4	26	16	+10	24	Advances to the Hexagonal
2	Murici (A)	14	6	4	4	24	16	+8	22	Advances to the Hexagonal
3	CSA (A)	14	6	4	4	23	16	+7	22	Advances to the Hexagonal
4	CEO (A)	14	5	5	4	17	14	+3	20	Advances to the Hexagonal
5	Sport Atalaia (Q)	14	5	3	6	19	26	−7	18	Torneio da Morte
6	Comercial-AL (Q)	14	4	5	5	15	15	0	17	Torneio da Morte
7	CSE (Q)	14	4	4	6	15	21	−6	16	Torneio da Morte
8	União-AL (Q)	14	3	4	7	10	25	−15	13	Torneio da Morte

Rules for classification: 1) Points; 2) wins; 3) goal difference; 4) head-to-head (if two teams involved); 5) goals scored; 6) draw
(A) Advance to a further round; (Q) Qualified for the phase indicated

=== Results ===
Home \ Away	CEO	COM	CAL	CSA	CSE	MUR	SAT	UNI
CEO		1–0	1–1	1–2	3–1	2–2	1–0	1–1
Comercial-AL	0–0		0–2	0–0	4–1	1–1	0–1	2–1
Corinthians Alagoano	0–1	2–0		1–1	1–1	2–1	4–0	4–1
CSA	1–3	1–2	2–4		3–1	1–0	6–0	3–0
CSE	3–2	1–0	2–0	0–1		2–1	1–1	0–1
Murici	1–0	1–1	1–0	1–1	3–1		4–3	6–0
Sport Atalaia	1–1	1–3	3–4	2–0	1–1	2–1		1–0
União-AL	1–0	2–2	2–1	1–1	0–0	0–1	0–3	

Legend: Blue = home team win; Yellow = draw; Red = away team win.

== Second round ("Hexagonal") ==
Pos	Team	Pld	W	D	L	GF	GA	GD	Pts	Qualification
1	CRB	10	6	2	2	19	7	+12	20	Advances to the Semifinals
2	CSA	10	4	5	1	16	11	+5	17	Advances to the Semifinals
3	ASA	10	4	2	4	16	16	0	14	Advances to the Semifinals
4	CEO	10	4	1	5	10	18	−8	13	Advances to the Semifinals
5	Murici	10	3	2	5	13	16	−3	11	
6	Corinthians Alagoano	10	2	2	6	15	21	−6	8	

Rules for classification: 1) Points; 2) wins; 3) goal difference; 4) head-to-head (if two teams involved); 5) goals scored; 6) draw

=== Results ===
Home \ Away	ASA	CEO	CAL	CRB	CSA	MUR
ASA		2–0	6–3	1–0	1–1	2–2
CEO	1–2		3–1	1–0	1–1	2–0
Corinthians Alagoano	2–0	1–2		2–2	2–2	2–0
CRB	2–1	6–0	2–0		1–0	4–1
CSA	2–0	2–0	3–2	1–1		2–2
Murici	3–1	3–0	1–0	0–1	1–2	

Legend: Blue = home team win; Yellow = draw; Red = away team win.

== Playoffs ==
Semifinals
1	CRB	1	2	3
4	CEO	1	1	2
2	CSA	1	1	2
3	ASA	0	1	1

Finals
1	CRB	4	0	4 (4)
2	CSA	2	1	3 (3)

=== Semifinals ===
==== First leg ====
April 27, 2013
20:30 UTC−03:00

ASA	0–1	CSA
		Everaldo 08'

Coaracy da Mata Fonseca, Arapiraca
Attendance: 3,474
Referee: Luiz Flávio de Oliveira

April 28, 2013
15:15 UTC−03:00

CEO	1–1	CRB
Denilson 54'		Jairo 08'

Estádio Edson Matias, Olho d'Água das Flores
Attendance: 1,869
Referee: Francisco Carlos Nascimento

==== Second leg ====
May 4, 2013
20:30 UTC−03:00

CRB	2–1 (a.e.t.)	CEO
Schwenck 6'; Gladstone 113'		Williams José 52'

Estádio Rei Pelé, Maceió
Attendance: 9,408
Referee: George Alves Feitoza

May 5, 2013
17:00UTC−03:00

CSA	1–1 (a.e.t.)	ASA
Alex Henrique 112'		Didira 09'

Estádio Rei Pelé, Maceió
Attendance: 11,351
Referee: Pablo dos Santos Alves

=== Finals ===
May 11, 2013
16:00 UTC−03:00

CSA	2–4	CRB
Alex Henrique 20'; Diego Clementino 82'		Schwenck 08', 62'; Everton Luiz 66'; Walter Minhoca 76'

Estádio Rei Pelé, Maceió
Attendance: 13,150
Referee: Wilton Sampaio

May 18, 2013
16:00 UTC−03:00

CRB	0–1	CSA
		Elyeser 78'
Penalties
Denilson (penalty scored); Paulo Sérgio (penalty scored); Johnnattan (penalty missed); Marcus Vinicius (penalty scored); Schwenck (penalty scored)	4-3	(penalty scored) Alex; (penalty missed) Adalberto; (penalty scored) Diego Clementino; (penalty scored) Everaldo; (penalty missed) Anderson

Estádio Rei Pelé, Maceió
Attendance: 18,033
Referee: Péricles Bassols

== Relegation round (Torneio da Morte) ==
Pos	Team	Pld	W	D	L	GF	GA	GD	Pts	Relegation
1	Comercial-AL	6	4	1	1	16	8	+8	13	
2	CSE	6	3	2	1	14	10	+4	11	
3	Sport Atalaia (R)	6	2	1	3	4	9	−5	7	Torneio da Morte
4	União-AL (R)	6	0	2	4	5	12	−7	2	Torneio da Morte

Rules for classification: 1) Points; 2) wins; 3) goal difference; 4) head-to-head (if two teams involved); 5) goals scored; 6) draw
(R) Relegated

=== Results ===
Home \ Away	COM	CSE	SAT	UNI
Comercial-AL		5–2	4–2	2–0
CSE	3–2		1–1	4–0
Sport Atalaia	1–1	1–3		0–2
União-AL	0–2	1–1	1–0	

Legend: Blue = home team win; Yellow = draw; Red = away team win.

== Attendance ==
Club	CEO	COM	COR	CSA	CSE	MUR	SPO	UNI	Home	Away	Total
C.E.O		704			653		492				
Comercial				2.744	616			677			
Corinthians Alagoano	273	298						161			
CSA			5.010			4.443	3.327				
CSE				1.783	763			2.010			
Murici	451	1.008	405								
Sport Atalaia			608		817	788					
União	521			758			518				
