= Paulo Musse =

Brazilian footballer (born 1978)

Personal information
- Full name: Paulo Marques Musse
- Date of birth: 11 March 1978 (age 48)
- Place of birth: Salvador, Bahia, Brazil
- Height: 1.92 m (6 ft 3 1/2 in)
- Position: Goalkeeper

Team information
- Current team: Juventude

Senior career*
Years	Team	Apps	(Gls)
1999–2005	Vitória (BA)	39	(0)
2004	→ Paysandu (loan)	41	(0)
2006	Juventus (SP)	0	(0)
2006	Aves	4	(0)
2007	Bahia	0	(0)
2007	Atlético Mineiro	0	(0)
2007	→ CRB (loan)	10	(0)
2008	Santa Cruz	0	(0)
2008	ABC	30	(0)
2009	Botafogo (SP)	0	(0)
2009	ABC	11	(0)
2010	Linense	0	(0)
2010	ASA	22	(0)
2011	Linense	0	(0)
2011–2012	Oeste	11	(0)
2012	Juventude		
2013	Sertãozinho	21	(0)
2013	Rio Branco	8	(0)
2014	Goianésia	12	(0)
2014	Santa Helena		
2015	Treze		
2015	Vitória da Conquista		
2016	Atlético		
- * Club domestic league appearances and goals

Paulo Marques Musse (born 11 March 1978) is a Brazilian former footballer who played as a goalkeeper.

== Career ==
=== Vitória (BA) ===
Born in Salvador, capital of Bahia state, Musse started his career at Vitória and made 39 Campeonato Brasileiro Série A appearances for the club.

In 2004, he left for Campeonato Brasileiro struggler Paysandu, made 41 out of possible 46 appearances. That season the Pará state team finished in mid-table but Vitória relegated.

In July 2005, Musse signed a new 2-year deal with Vitória (BA) for 2005 Campeonato Brasileiro Série B. But the team used Felipe as first choice and Juninho as backup. The team relegated again in September 2005, just had lesser win than Sport do Recife (same point).

In 2006 season he was signed by Juventus (SP) for 2006 Campeonato Paulista.

=== Portugal ===
In 2006–07 season he left for Portuguese Liga side Aves, he was the understudy of Rui Faria. In January 2007 he left the club and Aves signed Nuno as new first choice.

=== Brazil Serie B ===
In January 2007, Paulo Musse returned to Brazil for Bahia, Vitória's city rival, started the 2007 Copa do Brasil matches. But before the start of 2007 Campeonato Brasileiro Série C, he left for Atlético Mineiro in July 2007, but left for CRB in August 2007 for 2007 Campeonato Brasileiro Série B. He was the backup keeper for Jeferson and Veloso, ahead the 4th keeper Ricardo Vilar. He made his league debut on round 25 (15 September 2007) and made a successive start from round 29 to 34 and from round 36 to 38.

In January 2008 he signed a 1-year contract with Santa Cruz, he left the club near the end of Campeonato Pernambucano and before the start of 2008 Campeonato Brasileiro Série C.

In April 2008 he was signed by ABC Futebol Clube for 2008 Campeonato Brasileiro Série B, he was the first choice ahead Raniere and Aloísio that season, played 30 out of possible 38, missed a successive 8 matches in mid-season. It was reported that the club agreed to loan him to Atlético Paranaense in August but Musse resigned after passed the medical.

Paulo Musse left for Botafogo (SP) in January 2009, signed a contract until the end of 2009 Campeonato Paulista.

In May 2009, he was re-signed by ABC Futebol Clube, as first choice since round 5, ahead Raniere, Tiago Cardoso and Wellington. But he did not call-up to team since round 17 (last match in round 16). Overall, he played 11 matches for ABC in national league that season, and the team finished as the bottom and relegated.

In January 2010 he left for Linense, winning Campeonato Paulista Série A2 with team. He then left for ASA of Série B. In December 2010 he returned to Linense until the end of 2011 Campeonato Paulista.

On 1 August 2011, he joined Oeste on free transfer. Musse played 11 games in 2011 Campeonato Brasileiro Série D, ahead Renato who played the first 3 rounds. Musse renewed his contract in January 2012, signing a contract until 10 October 2012 (or the end of 2012 Série C).

== Honours ==
Linense

- Campeonato Paulista Série A2: 2010
