= Fred (footballer, born 1984) =

Brazilian footballer

Personal information
- Full name: Frederico Luís Ladeira Campos
- Date of birth: 27 April 1984 (age 42)
- Place of birth: Cajuri, Brazil
- Height: 1.84 m (6 ft 0 in)
- Position: Goalkeeper

Team information
- Current team: Santa Cruz
- Number: 30

Youth career
- Cruzeiro

Senior career*
Years	Team	Apps	(Gls)
2005–2009	Ipatinga	54	(0)
2005	→ Valeriodoce (loan)		(0)
2010	Americano	0	(0)
2011	Guarani (MG)	0	(0)
2011	Villa Nova	4	(0)
2012	Araxá		(0)
2012–	Santa Cruz	25	(0)
- * Club domestic league appearances and goals as of 15:11, 8 October 2015 (UTC)

Frederico Luís Ladeira Campos (born 27 April 1984), known as just Fred, is a Brazilian footballer who plays for Santa Cruz.

== Biography ==
Fred, born in Cajuri, Minas Gerais started his career at Cruzeiro. He then left for another team inside the state, for Ipatinga. In 2005, he was loaned to another minor team Valeriodoce. He was the understudy of Rodrigo Posso in 2007 Campeonato Brasileiro Série B. However, he obtained the starting role in mid-season, made 21 appearances. The team promoted as the runner-up. Fred remained as the first choice in 2008 Campeonato Brasileiro Série A, made 19 appearances. In mid-season Fernando took the starting role. Ipatinga relegated at the end of season. Fred shared the starting role with Marcelo Cruz in 2009 Campeonato Brasileiro Série B, which Fred played 14 times.

In January 2010 he was signed by Americano. In 2011 season he left for Guarani (MG) until the end of state league, and then signed by Villa Nova for 2011 Campeonato Brasileiro Série D.

In 2012, he was signed by Araxá for Campeonato Mineiro Módulo II.
