= Campeonato =

Campeonato may refer to:

- Campeonato Brasileiro Série A
- Campeonato Paulista
- Campeonato de Portugal (1922–1938)
- 2026 Campeonato Brasileiro Série A
- Campeonato Carioca
- Campeonato Brasileiro
- Campeonato da Liga
- 2025–26 Campeonato de Portugal
- Campeonato Gaúcho
- Campeonato Mineiro
- Campeonato Brasileiro 2004
- Campeonato de Portugal (league)
- Campeonato Brasileiro de Basquete
- CONCACAF Campeonato de Naciones
- 2026 Campeonato Paranaense
- 2026 Campeonato Brasileiro Série B
- Campeonato Regional Centro
- 2025–26 Campeonato Nacional Feminino
- Campeonato Paulista Segunda Divisão
- Campeonato Nacional
- Campeonato Pernambucano
- 2026 Campeonato Pernambucano
- Campeonato Sergipano
- Campeonato Paulista Série A4
- Campeonato Brasileiro 2006
- Campeonato Amapaense
- Campeonato Paraense
- 1933–34 Campeonato Regional Mancomunado Centro-Sur
- Campeonato Amazonense
- Campeonato Roraimense
- Campeonato Potiguar
- Campeonato Nacional II Divisão Feminino
