= Fernando Leal (footballer) =

Brazilian footballer (born 1981)

Personal information
- Full name: Fernando Leal Fonseca
- Date of birth: 24 October 1981 (age 45)
- Place of birth: Uberaba, Brazil
- Height: 1.91 m (6 ft 3 in)
- Position: Goalkeeper

Youth career
- Cruzeiro

Senior career*
| Years | Team | Apps | (Gls) |
| 2001 | Cruzeiro | 0 | (0) |
| 2002 | Ipatinga | | |
| 2003–2005 | Criciúma | 2 | (0) |
| 2005 | Cianorte | | |
| 2006 | Democrata-GV | | |
| 2006 | Ríver-PI | 18 | (0) |
| 2007–2008 | Ipatinga | 17 | (0) |
| 2009–2010 | Bahia | 31 | (0) |
| 2011 | Mirassol | 0 | (0) |
| 2011 | Vitória | 23 | (0) |
| 2012 | Mirassol | 0 | (0) |
| 2012 | Grêmio Barueri | 20 | (0) |
| 2012–2014 | Oeste | 61 | (1) |
| 2014 | Fortaleza | 0 | (0) |
| 2014–2019 | América Mineiro | 25 | (0) |
| 2018 | → Mirassol (loan) | 0 | (0) |
- * Club domestic league appearances and goals

Fernando Leal Fonseca (born 24 October 1981), known as Fernando Leal or simply Fernando, is a Brazilian former footballer who played as a goalkeeper.

== Career ==
Fernando joined Cianorte in 2005, for 2005 Campeonato Brasileiro Série C. In January 2006 he was signed by state league first level newcomer EC Democrata of Governador Valadares, until the end of 2006 Minas Gerais state championship. In April, he was signed by Ríver Atlético Clube in 3-month deal, which Fernando extended his contract in July 2006, until the end of calendar year.

In August 2007 he was signed by Ipatinga in a 2 1/2-year contract. In the first season he was the backup of Rodrigo Posso and Fred. Fernando did not play any game in 2007 Campeonato Brasileiro Série B, which the team finished as the runner-up. In the next season he played half of the matches of 2008 Campeonato Brasileiro Série A, ahead Fred in the second half of season.

In January 2009 Fernando signed a two-year contract with Bahia. He was the first choice of the team, except in 2010 Campeonato do Nordeste, which he only played once. Fernando made 31 appearances for Bahia in 2009 and 2010 Campeonato Brasileiro Série B.

He joined Vitória, city rival of EC Bahia on 3 May 2011. In January 2012 he was re-signed by Mirassol. The club also borrowed Vitória teammate Xuxa. Fernando was the first choice of the team, ahead his successor Veloso.

== Honours ==
América-MG

- Campeonato Mineiro: 2016
- Campeonato Brasileiro Série B: 2017
