= Campeonato Brasileiro 2007 =

Campeonato Brasileiro 2007 may refer to:

- Campeonato Brasileiro Série A 2007
- Campeonato Brasileiro Série B 2007
- Campeonato Brasileiro Série C 2007

== See also ==
- Campeonato Brasileiro (disambiguation)
