= Tiago Cardoso =

Brazilian footballer (born 1984)

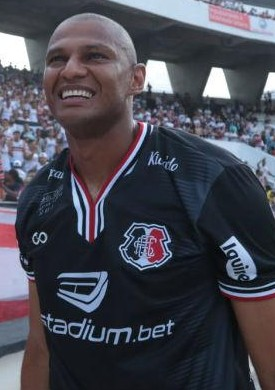

Personal information
- Full name: Tiago Cardoso dos Santos
- Date of birth: 8 May 1984 (age 42)
- Place of birth: Altos, Brazil
- Height: 1.87 m (6 ft 2 in)
- Position: Goalkeeper

Youth career
- 1999: Tiradentes
- 2000: Juazeiro do Norte
- 2001: Ceará
- 2001–2004: Atlético Paranaense
- 2002: → Grêmio Maringá (loan)

Senior career*
Years	Team	Apps	(Gls)
2005–2007	Atlético Paranaense	14	(0)
2007	→ Fortaleza (loan)		
2008–2009	Fortaleza		
2009	ABC	16	(0)
2010	Monte Azul	0	(0)
2011–2016	Santa Cruz	144	(0)
2017	Náutico	13	(0)
2018	Botafogo SP	15	(0)
2018	Goiás	2	(0)
2019	Mirassol	4	(0)
2019	Botafogo-SP	0	(0)
- * Club domestic league appearances and goals as of 15:41, 3 May 2019 (UTC)

Tiago Cardoso dos Santos (born 8 May 1984), known as Tiago Cardoso, is a former Brazilian footballer who played as a goalkeeper.

== Club career ==
In February 2009 he left for ABC Futebol Clube, as a second keeper behind Raniere and ahead of Wellington. The club also sold Aloísio soon after. Cardoso then took the first choice spot at the start of 2009 Campeonato Brasileiro Série B and competed for the starting spot with Raniere and new signing Paulo Musse during the season. Cardoso won the race in mid-season. Overall, he played 16 times in the national league with the relegated team.

In December 2009, he left for Monte Azul for the 2010 Campeonato Paulista Serie A1.

== Honours ==
Atlético Paranaense

- Campeonato Paranaense: 2005

Fortaleza

- Campeonato Cearense: 2007, 2008

Santa Cruz

- Campeonato Pernambucano: 2011, 2012, 2013, 2015, 2016
- Campeonato Brasileiro Série C: 2013
- Copa do Nordeste: 2016
