= Anderson Gibin =

Brazilian footballer (born 1979)

Personal information
- Full name: Anderson da Silva Gibin
- Date of birth: 21 July 1979 (age 47)
- Place of birth: São Paulo, Brazil
- Position: Goalkeeper

Team information
- Current team: Marcílio Dias

Senior career*
Years	Team	Apps	(Gls)
- ?
2005	Itumbiara		
2005	Araguaína		
2005	Goianésia		
2006–2007	Araguaína		
2007–2008	Paysandu	0	(0)
2008	Inhumas		
2009	Araguaína		
2009	Inhumas		
2009	Interporto		
2010	Corinthians (AL)		
2010–2011	CSA	7	(0)
2011	Interporto		
2011	CRB	7	(0)
2012–	Marcílio Dias		
- * Club domestic league appearances and goals

Anderson da Silva Gibin (born 21 July 1979), sometimes known as Anderson PB, is a Brazilian footballer who plays for Clube Náutico Marcílio Dias.

== Biography ==
In January 2005 he left for Itumbiara for Campeonato Goiano. On 28 March 2005 he left for Araguaína. In August 2005 he was signed by Goianésia. On 1 March 2006 he returned to Araguaína and he contract was extended to December 2007 in January 2007. In September 2007 he left for Paysandu, signed a 1-year contract. The club was eliminated from 2007 Campeonato Brasileiro Série C in August and was preparing for Copa do Centenário do Campeonato Paraense and for 2008 Campeonato Paraense. He was released before the start of 2008 Campeonato Brasileiro Série C.

In January 2010 he left for Corinthians Alagoano, and immediately made his debut in round 5 of Campeonato Alagoano, ahead Wagner and Marcos. In May 2010 he left for city rival CSA, and ahead Jéferson as first choice in 2010 Campeonato Brasileiro Série D and 2010 Campeonato Alagoano Segunda Divisão. He played 4 out of 5 State League Group stage matches. He also played at 2010 Campeonato do Nordeste.

In December 2010 he signed a new contract which last until the end of 2011 Campeonato Alagoano.

== Career statistics ==
Club performance			League		Cup		Total	
Season	Club	League	Apps	Goals	Apps	Goals	Apps	Goals
Brazil			League		Copa do Brasil		Total	
2005	Itumbiara	Goiano 1ª Divisão					?^{1}	?
2005	Araguaína	Tocantinense 1ª Divisão					?^{2}	?
2005	Goianésia	Goiano 2ª Divisão					?^{3}	?
2006	Araguaína	Tocantinense 1ª Divisão					?^{4}	?
2007	Araguaína	Tocantinense 1ª Divisão			1	0	?^{5}	?
2007	Paysandu	Brasileiro Série C					?^{6}	?
2008	Paysandu	Brasileiro Série C					?^{7}	?
2008	Inhumas	Goiano 3ª Divisão					?^{8}	?
2009	Araguaína	Tocantinense 1ª Divisão					?^{9}	?
2009	Inhumas	Goiano 2ª Divisão					?^{10}	?
2009	Interporto	Tocantinense 2ª Divisão					?^{11}	?
2010	Corinthians (AL)	Alagoano 1ª Divisão			2	0	18^{12}	0
2010	CSA	Brasileiro Série D	7	0			23^{13}	0
Career total			7	0	3	0	?	?

^{1}2005 Campeonato Goiano statistics unknown
^{2}2005 Campeonato Tocantinense statistics unknown
^{3}2005 Campeonato Goiano Segunda Divisão statistics unknown
^{4}2006 Campeonato Tocantinense statistics unknown
^{5}2007 Campeonato Tocantinense statistics unknown
^{6}Copa do Centenário do Campeonato Paraense statistics unknown
^{7}2008 Campeonato Paraense statistics unknown
^{8}2008 Campeonato Goiano Terceira Divisão statistics unknown
^{9}2009 Campeonato Goiano statistics unknown
^{10}2009 Campeonato Goiano Segunda Divisão statistics unknown
^{11}2009 Campeonato Tocantinense Segunda Divisão statistics unknown
^{12}Include 16 matches at 2010 Campeonato Alagoano.
^{13}Include 4 matches at 2010 Campeonato Alagoano Segunda Divisão and 12 matches at 2010 Campeonato do Nordeste.

== Honours ==
Champion

- Campeonato Tocantinense: 2006, 2009 (Araguaína)
- Campeonato Tocantinense Segunda Divisão: 2009
- Campeonato Alagoano Segunda Divisão: 2010

Runner-up

- Campeonato Tocantinense: 2005, 2007 (Araguaína)
- Campeonato Goiano Terceira Divisão: 2008
