= Ricardo Villar =

Ricardo Villar may refer to:

- Ricardo Villar (Argentine footballer) (born 1989), Argentine footballer for Cremonese
- Ricardo Villar (Brazilian footballer) (born 1979), Brazilian footballer for FC Dallas

== See also ==
- Ricardo Vilar (born 1985), Brazilian football goalkeeper
