= Veloso (Brazilian footballer) =

Brazilian footballer

Personal information
- Full name: Deidson Araújo Maia
- Date of birth: 21 May 1983 (age 43)
- Place of birth: Montes Claros, MG, Brazil
- Height: 1.91 m (6 ft 3 in)
- Position: Goalkeeper

Youth career
- 1998–2005: São Paulo

Senior career*
Years	Team	Apps	(Gls)
2005–2006	Mogi Mirim	0	(0)
2007–2009	Corinthians Alagoano	0	(0)
2007	→ CRB (loan)	9	(0)
2008	→ CSA (loan)	1	(0)
2009	→ Gama (loan)	0	(0)
2009	Gama	0	(0)
2009	→ Ceilandense (loan)	0	(0)
2010	Cascavel	0	(0)
2010	Marcílio Dias	4	(0)
2011	Cascavel	0	(0)
2011–2012	Mirassol	13	(0)
2013	Rio Preto	19	(0)
2014	Catanduvense	19	(0)
2015–2016	Grêmio Novorizontino	24	(0)
2017	XV de Piracicaba	3	(0)
2018	Penapolense	7	(0)
2019	Cianorte	2	(0)
- * Club domestic league appearances and goals

Deidson Araújo Maia, better known as Veloso (born 21 May 1983), is a Brazilian former footballer who played as a goalkeeper.

== Biography ==
Born in Montes Claros, Minas Gerais state, Veloso started his career in São Paulo.

In April 2005, he signed a 4-month contract with Mogi Mirim for 2005 Campeonato Brasileiro Série C. He worked as backup keeper for Márcio Kessler.

In April 2006 he signed a 1-year extension. He also signed a 5-month deal in December 2005 and a 5-month deal in July 2005.

=== Alagoas ===
After played for Corinthians Alagoano at 2007 Campeonato Alagoano, in April 2007, he extended his contract with club until the end of year 2008. He was immediately loaned to city rival CRB for 2007 Campeonato Brasileiro Série B. He was understudy of Ricardo Vilar in the first 3 Série B matches and Vilar was dropped in round 4. Since round 4 Veloso became the first choice ahead of Jeferson. In round 13, Veloso lost his starting place and Jeferson became the first choice. CRB signed Paulo Musse in August 2007 and soon became the first choice, made Veloso dropped to the third keeper.

In January 2008, Veloso returned to Corinthians Alagoano for 2008 Campeonato Alagoano and 2008 Copa do Brasil. In June 2008, he was loaned to another city rival, CSA for 2008 Campeonato Brasileiro Série C, as understudy of Gilberto. He played his only match in round 4 (20 July 2008) and CSA failed to enter the second stage.

In January 2009, he signed a new 5-month contract with Corinthians Alagoano. He finished as losing finalists of the first half of 2009 Campeonato Alagoano.

=== Distrito Federal ===
In May 2009, he signed a new 1-year contract with club and loaned to Gama for 2009 Campeonato Brasileiro Série C, as understudy of Alencar along with Robson.

In August 2009, Gama bought him outright but left for another Distrito Federal team Ceilandense for the state league second division.

=== Cascavel, Marcílio Dias and Mirassol ===
In January 2010, he was signed by Cascavel until the end of 2010 Campeonato Paranaense. In July 2010 he left for Marcílio Dias for 2010 Campeonato Brasileiro Série D. He was the understudy of Márcio Kessler in the first 2 matches, but as first choice in the rest of the matches, with youth products Alemão and then Edmar on the bench. The Santa Catarina side failed to qualify for the second stage.

In January 2011 he returned to the city of Cascavel in 5 months contract. In July, he signed a 1-year deal with Mirassol, replacing departed Fernando. He played all possible game for Mirassol in 2011 Campeonato Brasileiro Série D. The team finished as the losing quarter-finalists. However, on 4 January 2012 Fernando returned to Mirassol and Veloso became the backup.

== Honours ==
- Campeonato Brasiliense Segunda Divisão: 2009
