= Ricardo Vilar =

Brazilian footballer

Personal information
- Full name: Ricardo Kaschensky Vilar
- Date of birth: 4 April 1985 (age 41)
- Place of birth: Curitiba, Brazil
- Height: 1.88 m (6 ft 2 in)
- Position: Goalkeeper

Team information
- Current team: Xylotymbou
- Number: 33

Youth career
- 2003–2005: Coritiba

Senior career*
Years	Team	Apps	(Gls)
2006–2007	Coritiba	0	(0)
2006	→ Portuguesa Santista (loan)	0	(0)
2007	Democrata-GV	0	(0)
2007	CRB	3	(0)
2008	Democrata-GV	3	(0)
2008	Treze	0	(0)
2009	Uberlândia	2	(0)
2010	Democrata-GV	7	(0)
2010	Mogi Mirim	0	(0)
2011	Democrata-GV	11	(0)
2011	ASA	0	(0)
2012	J. Malucelli	9	(0)
2013	Campinense	0	(0)
2014	América (Teófilo Otoni)	1	(0)
2014	Ipatinga	6	(0)
2015	São Paulo-RS	12	(0)
2015	Caxias	0	(0)
2015	Rio Branco-RS	7	(0)
2016	São Paulo-RS	2	(0)
2017	Metropolitano	17	(0)
2017-2019	Tupi	50	(0)
2020	Villa Nova	6	(0)
2020-	Xylotymbou	16	(0)
- * Club domestic league appearances and goals as of 3 March 2021

Ricardo Kaschensky Vilar (born 4 April 1985) is a Brazilian footballer who plays for Xylotymbou.

== Biography ==
=== Coritiba ===
Born in Curitiba, Vilar started his career at hometown club Coritiba Foot Ball Club. In 2006 season, he was loaned to Portuguesa Santista for 2006 Campeonato Paulista. He then returned to Coritiba and extended his contract to July 2007. He was the fourth keeper for the club at 2006 Campeonato Brasileiro Série B, behind Artur, Kleber and Café. He also played as unused bench in the first few matches in 2007 season, behind Café but ahead Marcelo Bonan. Vilar and Bonan both left the club after Artur was re-signed.

=== Democrata-GV ===
Since 1 March 2007, he played for Democrata-GV at Campeonato Mineiro (first half of the year) and left for other clubs in mid of the year. He finished as the losing semi-finalist that lost to the 2007 champion Atlético Mineiro. He was the first choice since round 7, ahead Reinaldo.

In May 2007, he left for Campeonato Brasileiro Série B side CRB, at first as first choice but soon became the fourth keeper behind Veloso, Paulo Musse and Jéferson.

With Democrata, he finished as the 8th place in 2008 season.

In June 2008 he left for Campeonato Brasileiro Série C side Treze.

In January 2009, he left for Democrata's league rival Uberlândia as backup of Paulo César, and after the team avoided from relegation, he was the first choice from round 9 to 11.

In June 2009 he trailed at the Czech club SK Slavia Praha.

In January 2010 he returned to Democrata for the third time. He was on the bench against Atlético Mineiro (later the champion) in the semi-final, as the backup for Bruno Pianissolla. He was the first choice in the group stage.

In August 2010, he left for Mogi Mirim to play at Copa Paulista. He was the understudy for Cleber, ahead Maicon.

He started in round 11, after that match the coach used Daniel as starting keeper. Vilar then returned to play as the starting keeper in round 14.

== Career statistics ==
Club performance			League		Cup		League Cup		Total	
Season	Club	League	Apps	Goals	Apps	Goals	Apps	Goals	Apps	Goals
Brazil			League		Copa do Brasil		League Cup		Total	
2006	Portuguesa Santista	Paulista Série A1					?	?	?	?
2006	Coritiba	Brasileiro Série B	0	0					0	0
2007	Coritiba	Brasileiro Série B	0	0	0	0	0	0	0	0
2007	Democrata-GV	Mineiro Módulo I					7	0	7	0
2007	CRB	Brasileiro Série B	3	0					3	0
2008	Democrata-GV	Mineiro Módulo I			2	0	11	0	13	0
2008	Treze	Brasileiro Série C	0	0					0	0
2009	Uberlândia	Mineiro Módulo I					3	0	3	0
Brazil			League		Copa do Brasil		League Cup		Total	
2010	Democrata-GV	Mineiro Módulo I					7	0	7	0
2010	Mogi Mirim	Paulista Série A1							2	0^{1}
2011	Democrata-GV	Mineiro Módulo I					11	0	11	0
Total	Brazil		3	0	2	0	?	?	?	?
Total	Czech Republic		0	0	?	?	?	?	?	?
Career total			3	0	?	?	?	?	?	?

^{1} 2010 Copa Paulista
