= Raniere =

Raniere may refer to:

- Keith Raniere (born 1960), American cult leader and criminal
- Raniere (footballer) (Raniere Silva dos Santos, born 1980), Brazilian footballer
