= Aloísio Silva =

Aloísio Silva may refer to:

- Aloísio da Silva Filho, (born 1974) Brazilian footballer
- Aloísio José da Silva, (born 1975) Brazilian footballer
