= Campeonato Brasileiro 2005 =

Campeonato Brasileiro 2005 may refer to:

- Campeonato Brasileiro Série A 2005
- Campeonato Brasileiro Série B 2005
- Campeonato Brasileiro Série C 2005

== See also ==
- Campeonato Brasileiro (disambiguation)
