= Ruan =

Ruan may refer to:

== Buildings ==
- Ruan Center, office building in Des Moines, Iowa
- John Ruan House, historic mansion in Philadelphia, Pennsylvania

== Places ==
- Ruan, County Clare, Ireland, a village and civil parish
- Ruan, Loiret, France, a small commune
- Mont Ruan, Switzerland, a mountain
- Ruan Major and Ruan Minor, two settlements in Cornwall, UK, forming part of the civil parish of Grade–Ruan
- Ruan Lanihorne, a civil parish and village in south Cornwall, England
- St Ruan, a hamlet in Cornwall, England

== People ==
- Ruan Botha (born 1992), a South African rugby union player
- Ruan Renato (born 1994), Brazilian football player
- Ruan (footballer, born 1995), Brazilian football player, full name Ruan Gregório Teixeira
- Ruan (footballer, born 1998), Brazilian football player, full name Ruan Vinicius Silva de Jesus
- Ruan (footballer, born 2005), Brazilian football player, full name Ruan Pereira Duarte
- Ruan Pienaar (born 1984), a South African professional rugby union player
- Ruan (surname)

== Other uses ==
- Ruan (instrument), a family of Chinese stringed instruments
