= Rhuan =

Rhuan is a name. Notable people with the name include:

== Given name ==
- Rhuan (footballer, born 1991), full name Rhuan Rogerio Elias Barbosa, Brazilian football centre-back
- Rhuan (footballer, born January 2000), full name Rhuan da Silveira Castro, Brazilian football attacking midfielder
- Rhuan (footballer, born October 2000), full name Rhuan Ferreira Ramos, Brazilian football left-back

== See also ==
- Ruan (disambiguation)
