= Pio (footballer, born 1986) =

Brazilian footballer

Personal information
- Full name: Felipe Anselmo Viciano
- Date of birth: 6 January 1986 (age 40)
- Place of birth: Santa Bárbara d'Oeste, Brazil
- Height: 1.73 m (5 ft 8 in)
- Position: Right midfielder

Team information
- Current team: Corinthians Alagoano

Senior career*
Years	Team	Apps	(Gls)
2006	Rio Branco		
2007	Santo André		
2008	Ituano		
2009	Hlavice		
2010	Ružomberok	3	(0)
2010	São Bernardo		
2011–	Corinthians Alagoano	2	(0)
2011	→Regetas Brasil (loan)	11	(0)
- * Club domestic league appearances and goals as of 9 February 2012

Felipe Anselmo Viciano (born 6 January 1986 in Santa Bárbara d'Oeste), commonly known as Pio is a Brazilian football player, currently plays for Corinthians Alagoano.

== MFK Ružomberok ==
On 5 February 2010, Felipe has signed contract for Slovak club MFK Ružomberok.
