= Campeonato Brasileiro 2006 =

Campeonato Brasileiro 2006 may refer to:

- Campeonato Brasileiro Série A 2006
- Campeonato Brasileiro Série B 2006
- Campeonato Brasileiro Série C 2006

== See also ==
- Campeonato Brasileiro (disambiguation)
