= Paulinho (footballer, born 5 May 1988) =

Brazilian footballer

Personal information
- Full name: Paulo Oliveira de Souza Júnior
- Date of birth: 5 May 1988 (age 38)
- Place of birth: Belém, Brazil
- Height: 1.77 m (5 ft 10 in)
- Position: Left back

Team information
- Current team: Fluminense-PI

Senior career*
| Years | Team | Apps | (Gls) |
| 2007–2008 | Tuna Luso | | |
| 2009 | Castanhal | | |
| 2009 | Juventude | | |
| 2009 | Ypiranga–AP | | |
| 2010–2013 | Murici | 43 | (3) |
| 2010 | → CSA (loan) | 14 | (1) |
| 2011 | → Coruripe (loan) | 10 | (0) |
| 2012 | Botafogo–SP | 0 | (0) |
| 2012 | Remo | 3 | (0) |
| 2013 | CSA | 4 | (0) |
| 2013 | Grêmio Barueri | 9 | (0) |
| 2014 | Londrina | 19 | (0) |
| 2014 | Paraná | 11 | (0) |
| 2015 | CSA | 16 | (0) |
| 2015–2016 | Londrina | 45 | (2) |
| 2017 | Goiás | 4 | (0) |
| 2018 | CSA | 9 | (0) |
| 2019–2022 | Marcílio Dias | 51 | (1) |
| 2019 | → Avaí (loan) | 6 | (0) |
| 2021 | → Brasil de Pelotas (loan) | 14 | (0) |
| 2022 | Hercílio Luz | 8 | (0) |
| 2022–2023 | Murici | 9 | (0) |
| 2023– | Fluminense-PI | 13 | (0) |
- * Club domestic league appearances and goals as of 22 July 2023

Paulo Oliveira de Souza Júnior (born 5 May 1988), known as Paulinho, is a Brazilian footballer who plays for Fluminense-PI as left back.

== Career statistics ==
As of 19 November 2019

| Club | Season | League | | | State League | | Cup | | Conmebol | | Other | | Total | |
| Club | Season | Division | Apps | Goals | Apps | Goals | Apps | Goals | Apps | Goals | Apps | Goals | Apps | Goals |
|---|---|---|---|---|---|---|---|---|---|---|---|---|---|---|
| Murici | 2010 | Alagoano | — | | 22 | 2 | — | | — | | — | | 22 | 2 |
| Murici | 2011 | Alagoano | — | | 19 | 1 | 1 | 0 | — | | — | | 20 | 1 |
| Murici | 2013 | Alagoano | — | | 2 | 0 | — | | — | | — | | 2 | 0 |
| Murici | Subtotal | | — | | 43 | 3 | 1 | 0 | — | | — | | 44 | 3 |
| CSA (loan) | 2010 | Série D | 8 | 1 | — | | — | | — | | — | | 8 | 1 |
| Coruripe (loan) | 2011 | Série D | 10 | 0 | — | | — | | — | | — | | 10 | 0 |
| Botafogo–SP | 2012 | Paulista | — | | 8 | 0 | — | | — | | — | | 8 | 0 |
| Remo | 2012 | Série D | 3 | 0 | — | | — | | — | | — | | 3 | 0 |
| CSA | 2013 | Série D | 4 | 0 | — | | — | | — | | — | | 4 | 0 |
| Grêmio Barueri | 2013 | Série C | 9 | 0 | — | | — | | — | | — | | 9 | 0 |
| Londrina | 2014 | Série D | — | | 17 | 0 | 2 | 0 | — | | — | | 19 | 0 |
| Paraná | 2014 | Série B | 11 | 0 | — | | — | | — | | — | | 11 | 0 |
| CSA | 2015 | Alagoano | — | | 16 | 0 | — | | — | | — | | 16 | 0 |
| Londrina | 2015 | Série C | 19 | 1 | — | | — | | — | | — | | 19 | 1 |
| Londrina | 2016 | Série D | 10 | 1 | 15 | 0 | 2 | 0 | — | | — | | 27 | 1 |
| Londrina | Subtotal | | 29 | 2 | 15 | 0 | 2 | 0 | — | | — | | 46 | 2 |
| Goiás | 2017 | Série B | 0 | 0 | 4 | 0 | — | | — | | — | | 4 | 0 |
| CSA | 2018 | Série B | 0 | 0 | 6 | 0 | — | | — | | 3 (Note: Appearance(s) in Copa do Nordeste) | 0 | 9 | 0 |
| Marcílio Dias | 2019 | Catarinense | — | | 19 | 1 | — | | — | | — | | 19 | 1 |
| Avaí (loan) | 2019 | Série A | 6 | 0 | — | | — | | — | | — | | 6 | 0 |
| Career total | | | 80 | 3 | 128 | 4 | 5 | 0 | 0 | 0 | 3 | 0 | 216 | 7 |

== Honours ==
Londrina

- Campeonato Paranaense: 2014

CSA

- Campeonato Alagoano: 2018
