= Campeonato Brasileiro 1971 =

Campeonato Brasileiro 1971 may refer to:

- Campeonato Brasileiro Série A 1971
- Campeonato Brasileiro Série B 1971
- Campeonato Brasileiro Série C 1971

== See also ==
- Campeonato Brasileiro (disambiguation)
