= Édson Di =

Brazilian footballer

Personal information
- Full name: Édson Andrade Almeida
- Date of birth: March 14, 1979 (age 47)
- Place of birth: Jacobina, Bahia, Brazil
- Height: 1.69 m (5 ft 7 in)
- Position: Striker

Team information
- Current team: Aposentado

Senior career*
Years	Team	Apps	(Gls)
1999	São Paulo		
1999–2000	Udinese		
2000–2003	Juventus		
2003	União São João		
2003–2004	Santa Cruz		
2004–2007	Coruripe		
2007	F.C. Paços de Ferreira	6	(0)
2008	América-RN		
2008	Boavista		
2009	Mixto	3	(0)
2010	Treze	1	(1)
2011	Duque de Caxias		
2011–2012	Coruripe	9	(4)
2013–	Flamengo-PI		
- * Club domestic league appearances and goals

Édson Andrade Almeida (born 14 March 1979), also known as Édson Di, is a Brazilian professional footballer who plays for Esporte Clube Flamengo.

== Career ==
Édson Di played for Boavista Sport Club in the 2009 Campeonato Carioca, scoring a goal as the club defeated Madureira.
