= Aloísio (footballer, born 1974) =

Brazilian footballer (born 1974)

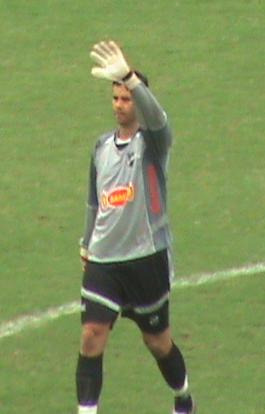
- Aloísio with ABC

Personal information
- Full name: Aloísio da Silva Filho
- Date of birth: 9 December 1974 (age 51)
- Place of birth: Rio Real, Brazil
- Height: 1.84 m (6 ft 0 in)
- Position: Goalkeeper

Team information
- Current team: Potiguar de Mossoró

Senior career*
Years	Team	Apps	(Gls)
- ?
2000–2002	Sergipe		
2002	Confiança		
2002	Fortaleza		
2005	Colo-Colo (BA)	0	(0)
2005–2006	Juazeiro	6	(0)
2006	Lagartense	0	(0)
2006	Fluminense de Feira	0	(0)
2007	Potiguar de Mossoró	0	(0)
2007	Itabaiana	0	(0)
2007–2009	ABC	2	(0)
2009–2010	ICASA	12	(0)
2010	Fluminense de Feira	4	(0)
2011	Potiguar de Mossoró		
- * Club domestic league appearances and goals

Aloísio da Silva Filho (born 9 December 1974), known as Aloísio, is a Brazilian footballer who plays as a goalkeeper for Potiguar de Mossoró.

He spent most of his career with Campeonato Brasileiro Série B and Série C teams. He also spent most of his career in Brazil Northeast Region, for clubs in Ceará, Rio Grande do Norte, Sergipe and Bahia.

He has the same given name along with his father, thus has a suffix Filho in his name.

== Career ==
Aloísio won promotion to Campeonato Brasileiro Série A in November 2002 as the third place of 2002 Campeonato Brasileiro Série B.

In January 2005, he was signed by Colo-Colo (BA) to play at 2005 Campeonato Baiano.

In July 2005 he left for another Bahia team, Campeonato Brasileiro Série C side Juazeiro, signed a 1-year contract. He signed a 3-moth contract with Lagartense in June 2006 for Copa Governo do Estado de Sergipe and Copa Sergipe–Bahia. He then returned to Bahia state, signed a contract with Fluminense de Feira, also for Copa Sergipe–Bahia.

In January 2007, he went to Rio Grande do Norte again, for Potiguar de Mossoró. Before the start of the national league, he left for Sergipe side Itabaiana before returned to Rio Grande do Norte for ABC Futebol Clube on 2 July 2007.

=== ABC FC ===
He was the backup keeper for Raniere at 2007 Campeonato Brasileiro Série C, played twice. The team won promotion as the fourth place. In 2008 season, he became the third keeper, after Paulo Musse and Raniere.

=== ICASA ===
In February 2009 he left for Campeonato Brasileiro Série C side ICASA. He was the backup keeper for Ari and the team finished as the bottom of 2009 Campeonato Cearense and relegated.

Aloísio started all 12 matches in Série C which won promotion to National Série B as losing semi-finalist. He was the first choice keeper for the team at 2010 Campeonato Cearense Segunda Divisão, which aimed to promotion, but lost his starting place to Mauro since round 7.

=== Returned to Fluminense de Feira ===
In March 2010 he left for Fluminense de Feira Futebol Clube to play for 2010 Campeonato Baiano, 2010 Campeonato do Nordeste, 2010 Copa Governador do Estado da Bahia and 2010 Campeonato Brasileiro Série D. He was the first choice ahead Tigre, played the first 4 matches of Série D, and replaced by Tigre in the 9th minute in the 4th match. He was dropped from squad for the rest of the matches under new coach (técnico) Luiz Carlos Cruz, which also his coach at Fortaleza. The team used Tigre and then new signing Beto. He only appeared once in 2010 Copa Governador do Estado da Bahia as unused bench on 11 September. The team used inferior squad as the match was one day before the Série D match and the head coach used third keeper Gil as starting keeper.

In January 2011 he was re-signed by Potiguar de Mossoró until the end of 2011 Campeonato Potiguar.

== Career statistics ==
Club performance			League		Cup		Total	
Season	Club	League	Apps	Goals	Apps	Goals	Apps	Goals
Brazil			League		Copa do Brasil		Total	
2000	Sergipe	Copa João Havelange	?	?	4	0	?	?
2001	Sergipe	Série B	?	?	2	0	?	?
2002	Sergipe	Série C	?	?	2	0	?	?
2002	Confiança	Série C	?	?			?	?
2002	Fortaleza	Série B	?	?			?	?
?
2005	Colo-Colo	Nil					?^{7}	?
2005	Juazeiro	Série C	5	0			5	0
2006	Juazeiro	Nil					?^{8}	?
2006	Lagartense	Nil					?^{9}	?
2006	Fluminense de Feira	Nil					?^{10}	?
2007	Potiguar de Mossoró	Série C	0	0			?^{11}	?
2007	Itabaiana	Nil					?^{12}	?
2007	ABC	Série C	2	0			2	0
2008	ABC	Série B	0	0	0	0	?^{13}	?
2009	ABC	Série B	0	0	0	0	?^{14}	?
2009	ICASA	Série C	12	0	0	0	12	0
2010	ICASA	Série B	0	0			5^{15}	0
2010	Fluminense de Feira	Série D	4	0			18^{16}	0
Career total					8	0		

^{7}Unknown appearances in 2005 Campeonato Baiano
^{8}Unknown appearances in 2006 Campeonato Baiano
^{9}Unknown appearances in 2006 Copa Governo do Estado de Sergipe
^{10}Unknown appearances in 2006 Copa Sergipe–Bahia
^{11}Unknown appearances in 2007 Campeonato Potiguar.
^{12}Unknown appearances in 2007 Copa Governo do Estado de Sergipe
^{13}Unknown appearances in 2008 Campeonato Potiguar.
^{14}Unknown appearances in 2009 Campeonato Potiguar.
^{15}Include 5 appearances in 2010 Campeonato Cearense Segunda Divisão.
^{16}Include 4 appearances in 2010 Campeonato Baiano and 10 appearances in 2010 Campeonato do Nordeste.

== Honours ==
=== Regional ===
Fluminense

- Copa Sergipe–Bahia: 2006

=== State ===
Itabaiana

- Copa Governo do Estado de Sergipe: 2006

ICASA

- Campeonato Cearense Segunda Divisão: 2010
