= Campeonato Brasileiro 2008 =

Campeonato Brasileiro 2008 may refer to:

- Campeonato Brasileiro Série A 2008
- Campeonato Brasileiro Série B 2008
- Campeonato Brasileiro Série C 2008

== See also ==
- Campeonato Brasileiro (disambiguation)
