= Xuxa (footballer) =

Brazilian footballer

Personal information
- Full name: Cássio Luís Rissardo
- Date of birth: 31 August 1981 (age 45)
- Place of birth: São Paulo, Brazil
- Position: Midfielder

Team information
- Current team: Mirassol

Youth career
- 2000–2003: Flamengo-SP

Senior career*
Years	Team	Apps	(Gls)
2003–2004	Mirassol	0	(0)
2005–2007	Marília	0	(0)
2005	→ Mirassol (loan)	0	(0)
2005	→ Portuguesa (loan)	2	(0)
2006	→ América (RN) (loan)	0	(0)
2006	→ Vila Nova (loan)	4	(0)
2006	→ Anapolina (loan)		
2007	Sertãozinho	0	(0)
2008	Marília	0	(0)
2008–2009	Juventude		
2009	→ Grêmio Barueri (loan)	1	(0)
2009	→ São Caetano (loan)	24	(4)
2010	Botafogo (SP)	0	(0)
2010	Santo André	20	(4)
2011	Mirassol	0	(0)
2011–	Vitória	14	(2)
2012–	→ Mirassol (loan)	0	(0)
- * Club domestic league appearances and goals

Cássio Luís Rissardo known as Xuxa (born 31 August 1981) is a Brazilian footballer who plays for Mirassol.

== Biography ==
Born in São Paulo, Xuxa started his professional career at Mirassol. At first he signed a 1 1/2-year contract in July 2003. He was signed by Marília in January 2005 and in July loaned to Portuguesa for 2005 Campeonato Brasileiro Série B. However, Xuxa only played twice, on 8 July and 12 July as substitutes. He also spent the first half of the year at Mirassol, for 2005 São Paulo state championship.

In 2006 season at first he played for América (RN), and in June left for Vila Nova. In September he was signed by Anapolina until the end of 2006 Série C. Xuxa returned to Marília in January 2007 but left for Sertãozinho on free transfer in June 2007. After played in 2007 Copa Paulista, Xuxa returned to Marília again in short-term deal in January 2008. He scored nine goals for Marília during the 2008 Campeonato Paulista.

In April 2008 Xuxa was signed by Juventude in 1 1/2-year contract. He played for the team at Rio Grande do Sul state championship and 2008 Brazilian Série B.

In January 2009 he was signed by Grêmio Barueri in 1-year loan. However, after his only appearance in 2009 Brazilian Série A, Xuxa moved back to Série B for São Caetano in July.

In December 2009 Xuxa joined Botafogo (SP) on free transfer, where he played in the state championship. In May 2010 he was signed by Santo André in 2-year contract. The club relegated from 2010 Brazilian Série B at the end of season. In December 2010 he was re-signed by Mirassol in short-term deal. He scored 8 goals in 2011 state championship.

In May 2011 he was signed by Vitória in 1 1/2-year contract, joining keeper Fernando. Xuxa played 14 games only in 2011 Brazilian Série B. In January 2012 both players were allowed to return to Mirassol but Xuxa was in temporary deal.
