= Nelsão =

Multi-use stadium in Maceió, Brazil

Nelsão, also known as Estádio Nélson Peixoto Feijó, is a multi-use stadium located in Maceió, Brazil. It is used mostly for football matches and hosts the home matches of Sport Club Corinthians Alagoano. The stadium has a maximum capacity of 10,000 people.
