= Estádio Fonte Nova =

Former football stadium

Coordinates: 12°58′43.7″S 38°30′15.1″W

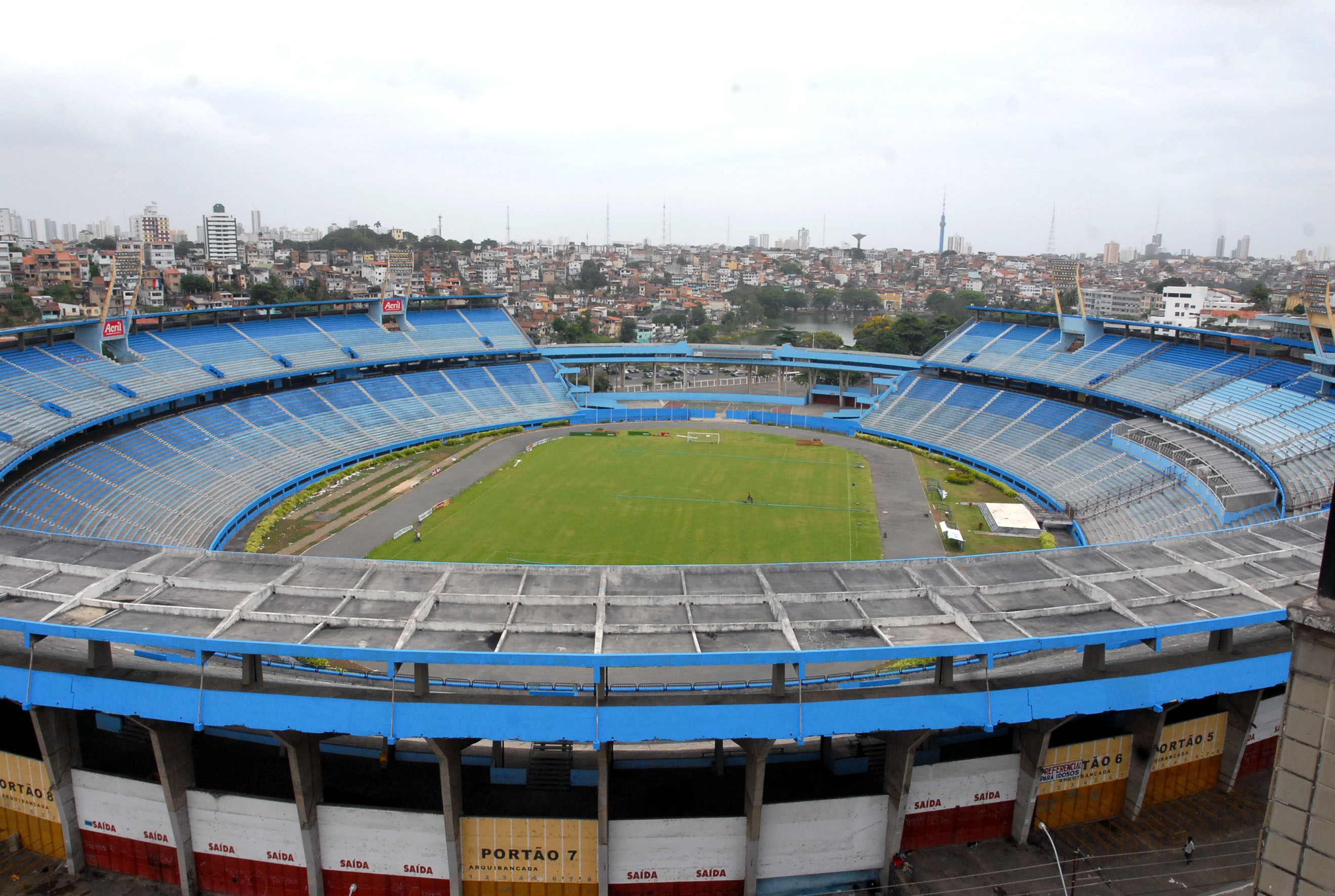
- Interactive map of Estádio Fonte Nova
- Full name: Estádio Octávio Mangabeira
- Location: R. Lions Club, 217-547, Nazaré, Salvador, Brazil
- Owner: Bahia State Government
- Capacity: 60,000
- Surface: Grass
- Field size: 105 x 68m

Construction
- Groundbreaking: January 28, 1951
- Built: 1951
- Opened: 1951
- Expanded: 1969-1971
- Closed: November 26, 2007
- Demolished: June-October 2010

Tenants
- Esporte Clube Bahia; Esporte Clube Vitória

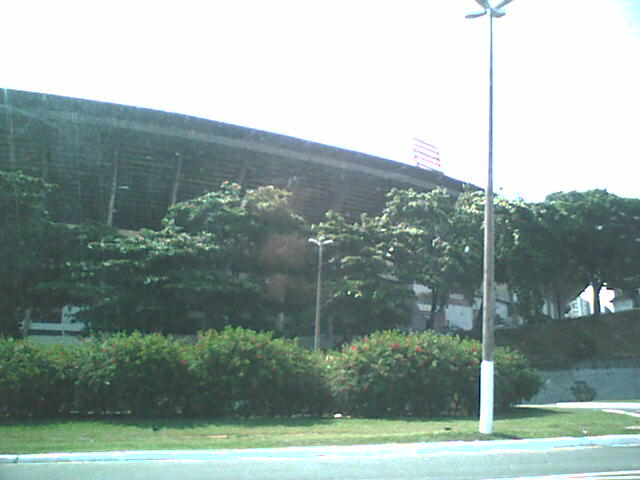
Estádio Fonte Nova.

The Estádio Fonte Nova, also known as Estádio Octávio Mangabeira, was a football stadium inaugurated on January 28, 1951 in Salvador, Bahia, with a maximum capacity of 66,080 people. The stadium was owned by the Bahia government, and was the home stadium of Esporte Clube Bahia and Esporte Clube Vitória. Its formal name honors Octávio Cavalcanti Mangabeira (1886–1960), a civil engineer, journalist, and former Bahia state governor from 1947 to 1954.

After part of the upper terraces collapsed in 2007, killing 7 people and injuring several others, the government of Bahia announced the demolition of Fonte Nova and the construction of a new stadium, the Arena Fonte Nova, in the same place.

The stadium was nicknamed Fonte Nova because it was located at Ladeira das Fontes das Pedras.

== History ==
The stadium construction ended in 1951. On March 4, 1971, the stadium was reinaugurated, after a great reformation involving the addition of a second tier, which expanded the maximum stadium capacity from 35,000 to 110,000. In the reinauguration day, two matches were played: Bahia against Flamengo, and Vitória against Grêmio. On that day happened a big tumult, where two people died.

The inaugural match was played on January 28, 1951, when Guarany and Botafogo, both local Bahia state teams, drew 2-1. The first goal of the stadium was scored by Guarany's Nélson.

The stadium's attendance record currently stands at 110,438, set on February 12, 1989 when Bahia beat Fluminense 2-1.

On November 25, 2007, when the Brazilian Championship Third Division match between Bahia and Vila Nova was nearly over with more than 60,000 supporters in attendance, a section of the stadium's highest terraces collapsed when Bahia's supporters were celebrating the club's promotion to the Brazilian Championship Second Division, killing seven people and injuring forty others. Jacques Wagner, the governor of Bahia state at the time, ordered the stadium to be closed as the causes of the accident are under investigation by the authorities, and he also said on November 26, 2007 that the stadium may be demolished if its structure is compromised. On November 27, 2007, the governor of Bahia announced that Estádio Fonte Nova would be demolished, and that a new stadium would be built in its place. On September 28, 2008, Bahia's governor Jaques Wagner announced that instead of being demolished, the stadium would be reformed into a multiuse arena with a maximum capacity of 60,000 people seated.

Demolition of the Octavio Mangabeira Stadium began in June 2010 and is expected to be finished by August - the upper tier was demolished using explosives on August 29, 2010. After the implosion, a portion of the upper tier was left standing, which was dismantled manually until October. The Bahia Arena was constructed as a venue for the 2016 Summer Olympics for football tournaments. During its construction, Bahia played in Estádio de Pituaçu.
