= Associação Atlética Coruripe =

Coruripe
- Full name: Associação Atlética Coruripe
- Nicknames: Hulk; Verdão Praiano (Beach Big Green)
- Founded: 1 March 2003; 23 years ago
- Ground: Estádio Gerson Amaral
- Capacity: 5,560
- Head coach: Roberto de Jesus
- League: Campeonato Alagoano
- 2025: Alagoano, 5th of 8
- Website: www.coruripenet.com
Home colours	Away colours

Associação Atlética Coruripe is a Brazilian professional football club based in Coruripe, Alagoas. It competes in the Campeonato Alagoano, the top division of the Alagoas state football league.

The club competed in the Campeonato Brasileiro Série C three times and won the state championship twice.

== History ==
On 1 March 2003, Associação Atlética Coruripe was founded.

In 2003, the club won its first title, the Campeonato Alagoano Second Division, after beating Sete de Setembro 3–1, at Gerson Amaral Stadium. Coruripe was also promoted to the following year's first division.

In 2004, the club was Campeonato Alagoano's runner-up. In the final the club was defeated by Corinthians Alagoano. On May 5, Coruripe won the first leg 3–2, but on May 9 the club was defeated 2–0. The club competed in the Campeonato Brasileiro Série C for the first time in that year. Coruripe, however, finished in the third position, being eliminated in that stage. The club finished only ahead of Corinthians Alagoano, but behind of Porto (PE) and Itacuruba.

In 2005, the club was again Campeonato Alagoano's runner-up. The club was defeated by ASA, which won both stages of the competition (the first stage, called Copa Maceió, and the second stage, named Copa Alagoas). Coruripe has also competed in the Copa do Brasil in that year. However, the club was eliminated in the first round by Fortaleza. Coruripe has also competed in that year's Campeonato Brasileiro Série C. The club reached the competition's third stage. In the first stage, the team finished in the first place, ahead of América de Natal, Nacional de Patos and Vitória (PE). In the second stage, Coruripe beat Icasa. In the third stage the club was eliminated by América de Natal.

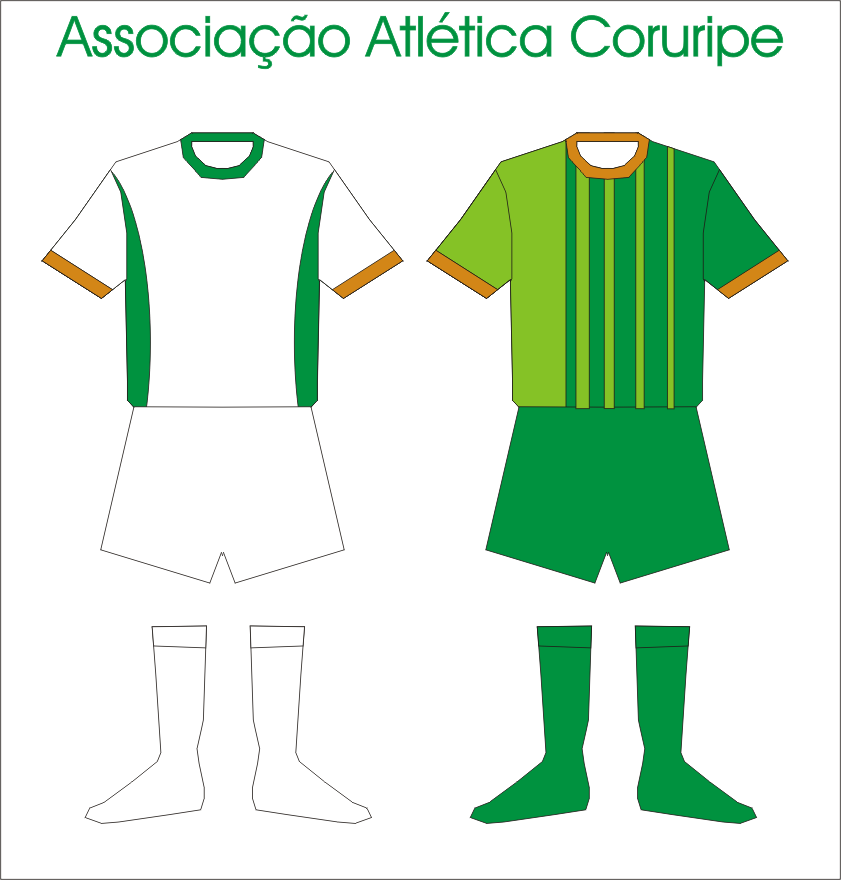
2006 Coruripe's home and away kits.

In 2006, Coruripe won the Campeonato Alagoano. In the final the club beat CSA. The club won the first leg 1–0, but was defeated 1–0 in the second leg. In the penalty shootout the club won 6–5. In the same year, the club competed again in the Campeonato Brasileiro Série C, reaching the second stage. In 2007, the club won the state championship again, competing in that season's Copa do Brasil where the club was eliminated in the first stage, and in the Campeonato Brasileiro Série C, reaching the competition's third stage. In 2008, Coruripe was again eliminated in Copa do Brasil's first stage.

== Honours ==
- Campeonato Alagoano
  - Winners (3): 2006, 2007, 2014
  - Runners-up (3): 2004, 2005, 2011
- Campeonato Alagoano Second Division
  - Winners (2): 2003, 2022
- Copa Alagoas
  - Winners (2): 2005, 2007
- Copa Maceió
  - Winners (3): 2006, 2007, 2014

== Current squad ==
=== First Team ===
Note: Flags indicate national team as defined under FIFA eligibility rules; some limited exceptions apply. Players may hold more than one non-FIFA nationality.

No.	Pos.	Nation	Player
—	GK	BRA	Santos
—	GK	BRA	Jéferson
—	DF	BRA	Paulinho
—	DF	BRA	Leandro
—	DF	BRA	Mendonça
—	DF	BRA	Alex Murici
—	DF	BRA	Silvio
—	DF	BRA	Cristiano
—	DF	BRA	Diego Padilha
—	DF	BRA	Hitalo
—	DF	BRA	Macaé
—	DF	BRA	Alex
—	MF	BRA	Jaelson

No.	Pos.	Nation	Player
—	MF	BRA	Anderson Santos
—	MF	BRA	Ricardinho
—	MF	BRA	Gueba
—	MF	BRA	Jonatas
—	MF	BRA	Dewide
—	MF	BRA	Guego
—	MF	BRA	Alisson
—	MF	BRA	Rhuan
—	FW	BRA	Paulinho Marília
—	FW	BRA	Édson Di
—	FW	BRA	Ivan
—	FW	BRA	Lindoval
—	FW	BRA	Dinda
—	FW	BRA	Theo

== Stadium ==
The club's home matches are usually played at Gerson Amaral stadium, which has a maximum capacity of 2,000 people.

== Club colors ==
The club's colors are green, blue and yellow.

== Mascot ==
Coruripe's mascot is Marvel Comics super-hero The Incredible Hulk.
