= Moreira Sales =

Coordinates: 24°01′S 53°03′W

- Municipality
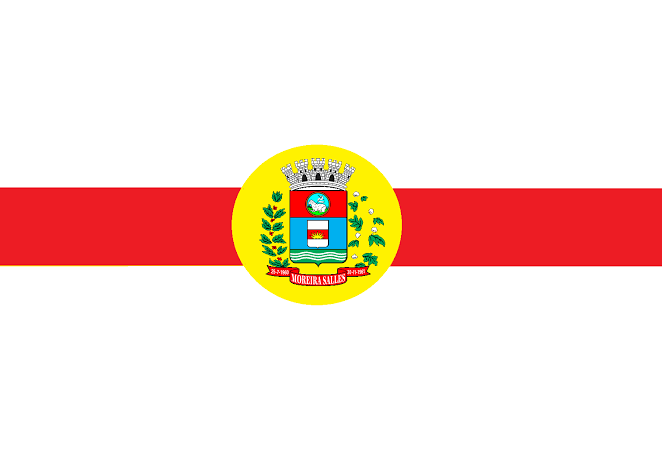
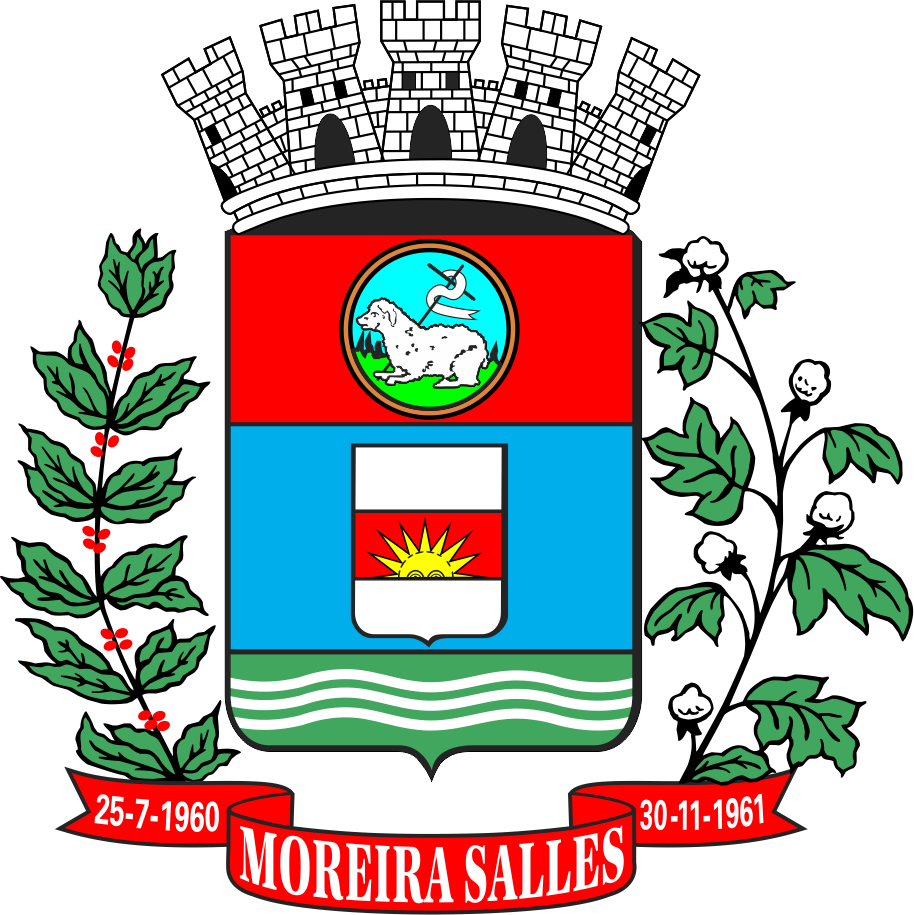
- Flag Coat of arms
- Interactive map of Moreira Sales
- Country: Brazil
- Region: Southern
- State: Paraná
- Mesoregion: Centro Ocidental Paranaense

Population (2020)
  - Total: 12,042
- Time zone: UTC−3 (BRT)

Moreira Sales is a municipality in the state of Paraná in the Southern Region of Brazil.

== See also ==
- List of municipalities in Paraná
