= Campeonato Brasileiro 2004 =

Campeonato Brasileiro 2004 may refer to:

- Campeonato Brasileiro Série A 2004
- Campeonato Brasileiro Série B 2004
- Campeonato Brasileiro Série C 2004

== See also ==
- Campeonato Brasileiro (disambiguation)
