= Olho d'Água das Flores =

Municipality in Alagoas, Brazil

- Municipality of Alagoas, Brazil
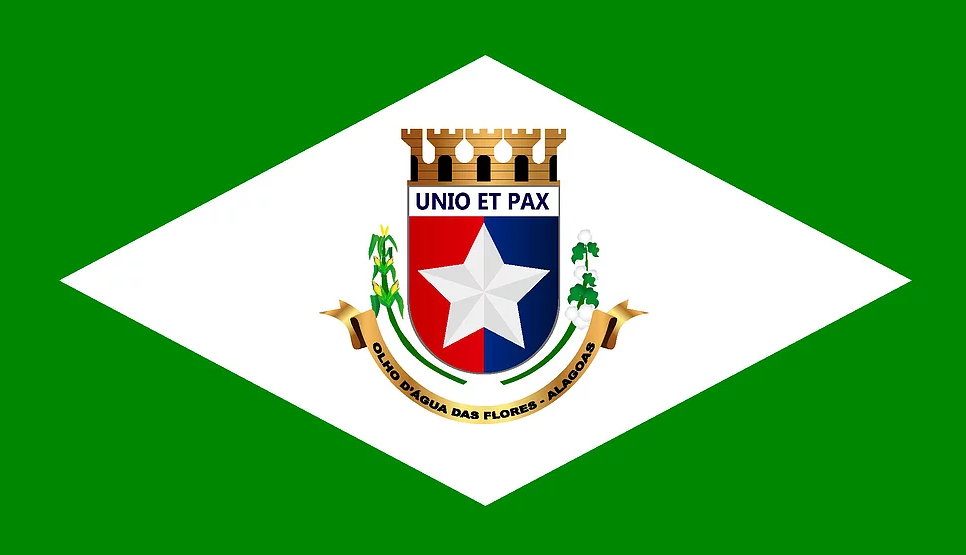
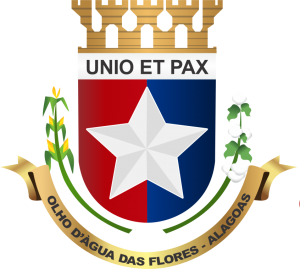
- Flag Coat of arms
- Etymology: Means in Brazilian Portuguese "Eye of water of the flowers", referring to a water spring in the area which had a tree near it, when the tree bloomed, its flowers covered the spring
- Motto: Latin: Unio et pax English: Union and peace
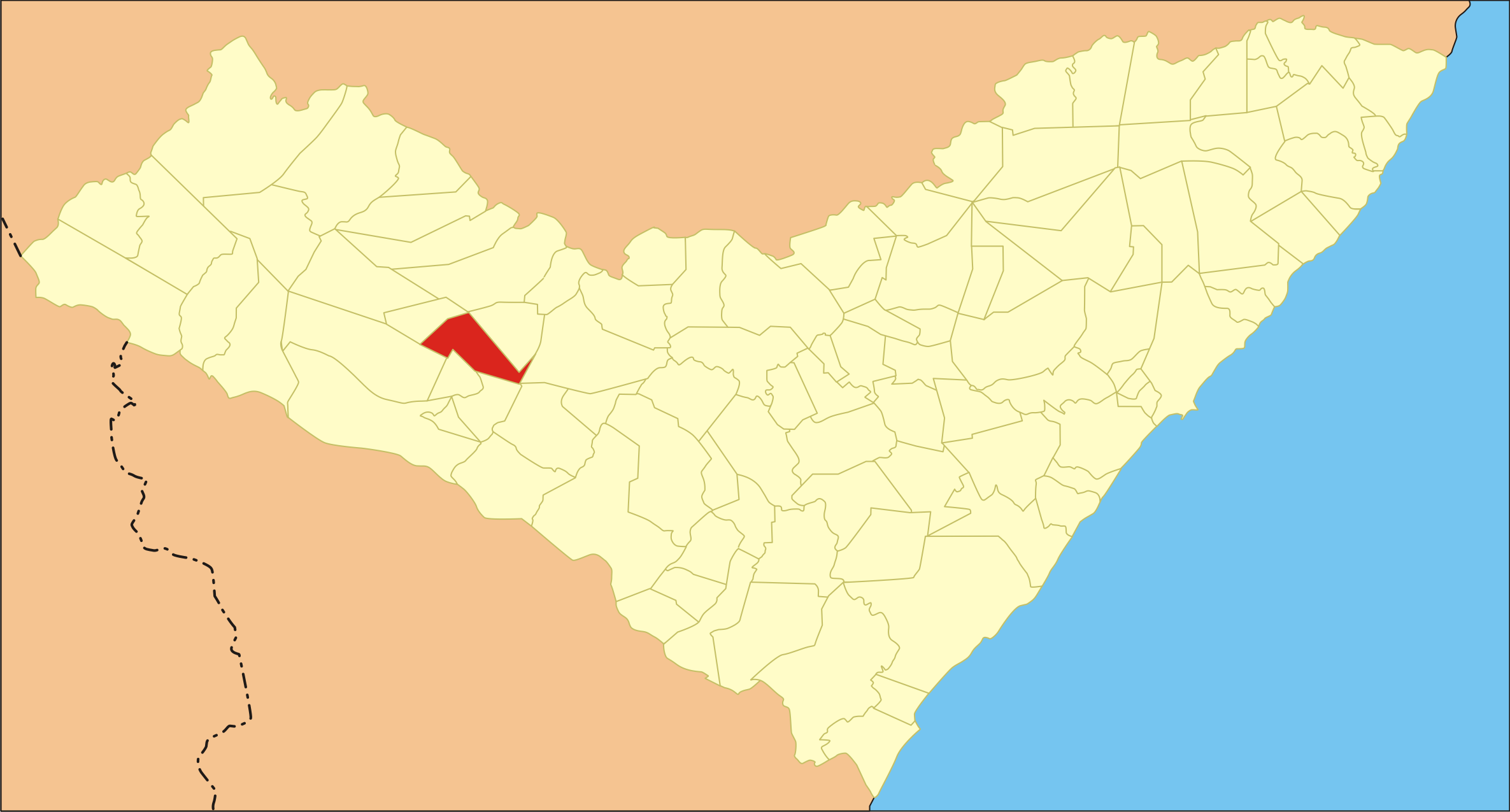
- Location of Olho d'Água das Flores in Alagoas

- Location within Brazil Location within South America
- Coordinates: 9°32′9″S 37°17′38″W
- Country: Brazil
- Region: Northeast
- State: Alagoas
- Founded: 2 December 1953

Government
  - Mayor: José Luiz Vasconcellos dos Anjos (MDB) (2025-2028)
  - Vice Mayor: Clemens Santana Machado (MDB) (2025-2028)

Area
  - Total: 188.397 km^{2} (72.740 sq mi)
- Elevation: 286 m (938 ft)

Population (2022)
  - Total: 20,695
  - Density: 109.95/km^{2} (284.8/sq mi)
- Demonym: Olho-daguense (Brazilian Portuguese)
- Time zone: UTC-03:00 (Brasília Time)
- Postal code: 57442-000
- HDI (2010): 0.565 – medium
- Website: olhodaguadasflores.al.gov.br

Olho d'Água das Flores (Central northeastern portuguese pronunciation: [ˈojʊ ˈdagwɐ ˈdɐɦ ˈflo]) is a municipality located in the west of Alagoas, a Brazilian state. Its population is 21,738 (2020) and its area is 183 km^{2}.

== See also ==
- List of municipalities in Alagoas
