= Sport Clube Santo Antônio =

Sport Atalaia
- Full name: Sport Clube Santo Antônio
- Nickname(s): Leão da Mata
- Founded: 13 June 2007; 17 years ago
- Ground: Estádio Luís de Albuquerque Pontes
- Capacity: 3,000
- 2015: Alagoano, 10th of 10 (withdrew)
Home colours	Away colours

Sport Clube Santo Antônio, commonly known as Sport Atalaia, is an amateur Brazilian football club based in Atalaia, Alagoas. The team withdrew from the Campeonato Alagoano in the 2015 season.

== History ==
The club was founded on 13 July 2007. They finished as runners-up in the 2010 Campeonato Alagoano Second Level, losing the competition to CSA.

== Stadium ==
Sport Clube Santo Antônio play their home games at Estádio Luís de Albuquerque Pontes. The stadium has a maximum capacity of 3,000 people.
