= Ruan (footballer, born 1998) =

Brazilian footballer

Personal information
- Full name: Ruan Vinicius Silva de Jesus
- Date of birth: 21 October 1998 (age 28)
- Place of birth: São Francisco do Conde, Brazil
- Height: 1.86 m (6 ft 1 in)
- Position: Defender

Team information
- Current team: Vera Cruz-PE (on loan from Retrô)

Youth career
- –2017: Náutico
- 2017–2018: Chapecoense

Senior career*
Years	Team	Apps	(Gls)
2019	Chapecoense	0	(0)
2019	→ Atibaia (loan)	0	(0)
2020–	Retrô	1	(0)
2020–	→ Vera Cruz-PE (loan)	7	(1)
- * Club domestic league appearances and goals as of 16:14, 17 November 2020 (UTC)

Ruan Vinicius Silva de Jesus (born 21 October 1998), commonly known as Ruan, is a Brazilian footballer who currently plays as a defender for Vera Cruz-PE, on loan from Retrô.

== Career statistics ==
=== Club ===
As of 6 August 2020.

Club	Season	League			State League		Cup		Other		Total	
Club	Season	Division	Apps	Goals	Apps	Goals	Apps	Goals	Apps	Goals	Apps	Goals
Chapecoense	2019	Série A	0	0	0	0	0	0	0	0	0	0
Atibaia	2019	–			0	0	–		1 (Note: Appearances in the Copa Paulista)	0	1	0
Retrô	2020	–			1 (Note: Appearances in the Campeonato Pernambucano)	0	0	0	0	0	1	0
Vera Cruz-PE (loan)	2020	–			7 (Note: Appearances in the Campeonato Pernambucano Série A2)	1	0	0	0	0	7	1
Career total			0	0	8	1	0	0	1	0	9	1
