= Diego Clementino =

Brazilian footballer (born 1984)

Personal information
- Full name: Diego José Clementino
- Date of birth: 18 March 1984 (age 42)
- Place of birth: São Paulo, Brazil
- Height: 1.75 m (5 ft 9 in)
- Position: Striker

Team information
- Current team: São Bento

Youth career
- 2000: Cruzeiro

Senior career*
Years	Team	Apps	(Gls)
2001–2003	Cruzeiro	2	(0)
2004	→ Nacional (loan)	7	(1)
2004	Cruzeiro	54	(11)
2005	→ Paulista (loan)	–	(–)
2005	→ Cabofriense (loan)	–	(–)
2006–2007	→ Nacional (loan)	32	(10)
2007–2010	Cruzeiro	3	(0)
2008	→ Ipatinga (loan)	–	(–)
2009	→ Botafogo (loan)	4	(0)
2009–2010	→ Saba Qom (loan)	14	(4)
2010	América Mineiro	9	(0)
2010–2011	Grêmio	17	(5)
2012	Red Bull Brasil	–	(–)
2012	ABC	11	(2)
2013	Rio Verde		(–)
2013	CSA		
2013–2014	ASA		
2014–2015	CRB		
2015	Villa Nova AC		
2015	Guarani De Bagé		
2015–2016	São Bento		
2016–2017	Mogi Mirim		
2017–	CSE		
- * Club domestic league appearances and goals

Diego José Clementino (born 18 March 1984), or simply Diego Clementino, is a Brazilian striker. He currently plays for Rio Verde.

== Club career ==
He joined Saba in December 2009.

Season	Team	Country	Division	Apps	Goals
06/07	C.D. Nacional	Portugal	1	32	10
2007	Cruzeiro	Brazil	1	3	0
2008	Ipatinga	Brazil	1	-	-
2009	Botafogo	Brazil	1	4	0
09/10	Saba	Iran	1	14	4

== Honours ==
- Campeonato Brasileiro Série A: 2003
- Copa do Brasil: 2003
- Campeonato Mineiro: 2003, 2006
