= Rodrigo Posso =

Brazilian footballer (born 1976)

Personal information
- Full name: Rodrigo Posso Moreno
- Date of birth: May 16, 1976 (age 50)
- Place of birth: Moreira Sales, Brazil
- Height: 1.87 m (6 ft 2 in)
- Position: Goalkeeper

Youth career
- Cruzeiro
- Comercial

Senior career*
Years	Team	Apps	(Gls)
1996—2000	Cruzeiro	9	(-)
1999	→Desportiva-ES (loan)	0	(-)
1999—2001	→Ipatinga (loan)		(-)
2002	Rio Branco-MG	0	(-)
2002	Tuna Luso	0	(-)
2003–2008	Ipatinga		(-)
2003	→Remo (loan)	0	(-)
2003	→ABC (loan)		(-)
2004	→Gama (loan)		(-)
2004	→Uberaba (loan)		(-)
2008	→Mirassol (loan)		(-)
2009	Ermis Aradippou	15	(-)
2010–2011	Uberlândia		(-)
2011–2012	Social		(-)
2012–2013	Nacional-MG		(-)
2017	São Sebastião		(-)
- * Club domestic league appearances and goals as of 3 November 2021

Rodrigo Posso Moreno (born May 16, 1976), known as Rodrigo Posso, is a retired Brazilian footballer who plays as a goalkeeper. He currently plays for Ermis Aradippou.

== Early life ==
Posso was born in Moreira Sales, Paraná, Brazil on May 16, 1976. As a child, he played mostly indoor football; his first experience on a field was with his grandfather's amateur league. His father wanted him to be a midfielder initially. Posso only ever wanted to be a soccer player and started working selling tickets at 14 to try something new, but left home at 15 to join Cruzeiro's youth team. His first club was Comercial.

== Career ==
After playing on their youth squad, Posso signed a professional contract with Cruzeiro in 1996. He won the Copa Libertadores with them in 1997 but only appeared four times before being loaned to Desportiva-ES and Ipatinga in 1999. He was eventually traded permanently to Ipatinga and played there every year between 2004 and 2007 except for 2002. During this time, he was loaned to Remo, ABC, Gama, Uberaba, and Mirassol. In 2004, Ipatinga won the Minas Gerais Cup and were state vice and semifinalists at the Copa do Brasil in 2006.

In 2009, he retired from goaltending to act as Ipatinga's Executive Director of Football. He learned quickly that he missed playing and signed on with Ermis Aradippou in Cyprus the same year. He played for a few months before returning to Brazil; he retired again briefly then signed with Uberlândia in 2010. In 2013, he retired for a third time after playing the 2012–2013 season with Nacional-MG. He remained retired until 2017, when he signed on with São Sebastião before retiring for his fourth and final time.

Posso occasionally plays on alumni teams. In 2015, he joined other former Cruzeiro players in a game against current Cruzeiros to celebrate Alex's retirement. In 2017, he competed in the Master category of the Minas Gerais Cup with other former Cruzeiros.

After retiring, he established a football school called the Rodrigo Passo Sports (RPS) Escola de Futebol in the municipality of Ipatinga. He coaches youth teams and in 2019 brought his U-15 team to the Disney Youth Soccer Cup, which was held in Orlando, Florida, USA. He also served as the president of the Sports and Education Association in Vale do Aço.

== Personal life ==
Posso has spent more time in Minas Gerais than he has in Paraná and feels more at home in Ipatinga, particularly because he was married and raised his children there. He has a degree in physical education from Unileste, a university in nearby Coronel Fabriciano.
