= Itanhém =

Municipality of Bahia, Brazil

Coordinates: 17°09′S 40°20′W

- Municipality
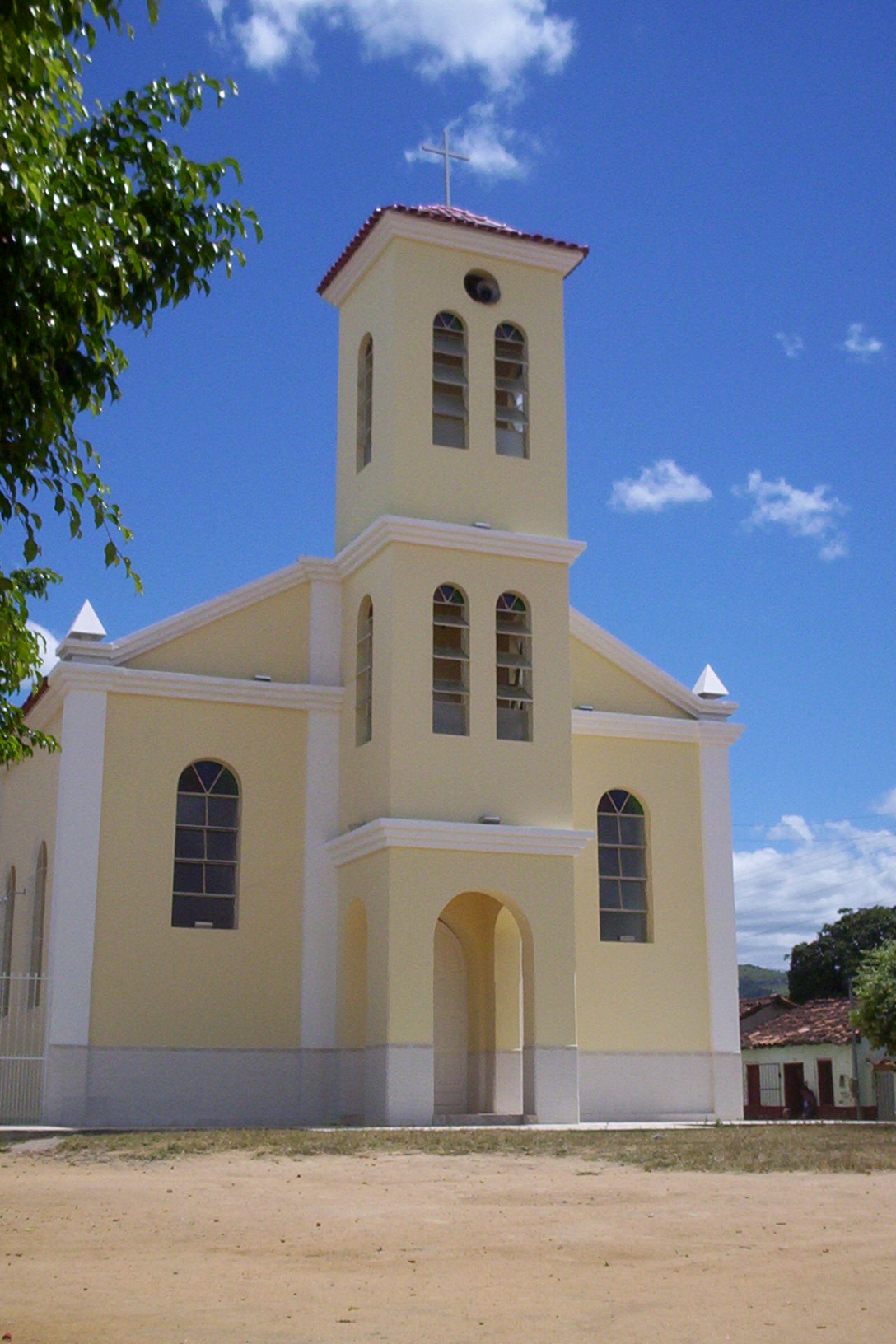

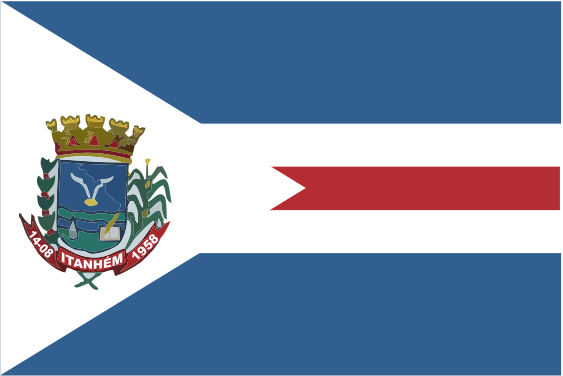
- Flag Coat of arms
- Interactive map of Itanhém
- Country: Brazil
- Region: Nordeste
- State: Bahia

Population (2022)
  - Total: 17,813
- Time zone: UTC−3 (BRT)

Itanhém is a municipality in the state of Bahia in the North-East region of Brazil.

== See also ==
- List of municipalities in Bahia
