= Ari (footballer, born 1986) =

Brazilian footballer

Personal information
- Full name: Ariclenes Jorge Gabriel da Silva
- Date of birth: April 18, 1986 (age 40)
- Place of birth: Curitiba, Brazil
- Height: 1.88 m (6 ft 2 in)
- Position: Goalkeeper

Youth career
- 2005: Londrina

Senior career*
Years	Team	Apps	(Gls)
2005–2007	Figueirense	2	(0)
2008	Rio Branco de Andradas		
2009	Icasa		
2010	Corinthians Paranaense		
2010–2011	Guarany	2	(0)
2011	Ferroviário (CE)	17	(0)
2012–2013	Salgueiro	4	(0)
2014–?	Barras		
- * Club domestic league appearances and goals

Ariclenes Jorge Gabriel da Silva (born April 18, 1986), or simply Ari, is a Brazilian professional footballer who plays as a goalkeeper.
