= Cajuri =

Brazilian municipality located in the state of Minas Gerais

Coordinates: 20°48′S 42°48′W

- Municipality
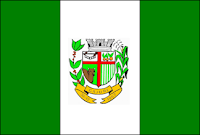
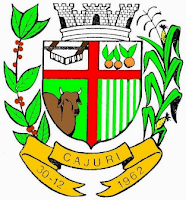
- Flag Coat of arms
- Interactive map of Cajuri
- Country: Brazil
- State: Minas Gerais
- Region: Southeast
- Time zone: UTC−3 (BRT)

Location of Cajuri within Minas Gerais

Cajuri is a Brazilian municipality located in the state of Minas Gerais. The city belongs to the mesoregion of Zona da Mata and to the microregion of Viçosa. As of 2020, the estimated population was 3,974.

== See also ==
- List of municipalities in Minas Gerais
