= Campeonato Brasileiro =

Campeonato Brasileiro, Portuguese for Brazilian Championship, may refer to:

== Football ==
- Campeonato Brasileiro Série A, the top league of Brazilian football
- Campeonato Brasileiro Série B, the second division
- Campeonato Brasileiro Série C, the third division
- Campeonato Brasileiro Série D, the fourth division
- Campeonato Brasileiro Sub-20, the top under-20 league
- Campeonato Brasileiro de Seleções Estaduais, defunct competition played by state teams
- Campeonato Brasileiro de Futebol Feminino, the top league of women's football in Brazil
- Campeonato Brasileiro de Aspirantes, a Brazilian league for the top-tier clubs' under-23 squads

== Other sports ==
- Campeonato Brasileiro de Beisebol, the main Brazilian baseball tournament
- Campeonato Brasileiro de Basquete, the main division of Brazilian basketball
- Campeonato Brasileiro de Stock Car, the main division of Brazilian national stock car championships, also known as Stock Car Brasil
- Campeonato Brasileiro de Rugby, the main division of Brazilian rugby union

== See also ==
- Campeonato Brasileiro 1971 (disambiguation)
- Campeonato Brasileiro 2004 (disambiguation)
- Campeonato Brasileiro 2005 (disambiguation)
- Campeonato Brasileiro 2006 (disambiguation)
- Campeonato Brasileiro 2007 (disambiguation)
- Campeonato Brasileiro 2008 (disambiguation)
