= Sport Club Corinthians Alagoano =

Corinthians Alagoano
- Full name: Sport Club Corinthians Alagoano
- Nickname(s): Tricolor da Via Expressa (Freeway's Tricolor); Timão da Serraria (Lumber-mill's Big Team)
- Founded: 4 April 1991; 33 years ago
- Dissolved: 2013
- Ground: Nelsão
- Capacity: 10,000
- 2013: Alagoano, 4th of 10
Home colours	Away colours

Sport Club Corinthians Alagoano, commonly referred to as Corinthians Alagoano, was a Brazilian professional football club based in Maceió, Alagoas. The team last participated in the Campeonato Alagoano in the 2013 season, before merging with Sport Club Santa Rita.

== History ==
On 4 April 1991, the club was founded. Four years later, in 1995, the club competed in the Campeonato Alagoano Second Division, which the club won without losing a single match. The club gained the right to play in the following year's First Division, but the team's board of directors preferred to stay in the Second Division.

In 1997 the club joined a partnership with the Portuguese club Benfica. The club again competed in the Campeonato Alagoano Second Division. Corinthians Alagoano won again without losing a single match and was promoted to the First Division.

In 2000, the club, for the first time ever, played in a national competition. Corinthians Alagoano was in the green module (which was the competition equivalent to the Third Division) of Copa João Havelange. In the first stage, the club qualified for the first position in their group. However, they were eliminated in the second stage. In 2001, Corinthians Alagoano competed in the Campeonato Brasileiro Third Division. The club was the first-placed team in their group in the first stage, but was, however, eliminated in the second stage. In the following year, in 2002, after a poor performance, Corinthians was eliminated in the first stage of the Campeonato Brasileiro third division. Corinthians Alagoano competed again in the competition in 2003. Corinthians Alagoano's group consisted of Botafogo (PB) and Sousa, both of Paraíba state. The club was defeated in all four group matches it played. Corinthians Alagoano also took part in that year's Copa do Brasil, but was eliminated in the first stage by Flamengo of Piauí.

In 2004, Corinthians Alagoano won its first state championship, after defeating Coruripe in the final. In the same year, the club again was eliminated in the first stage of the Campeonato Brasileiro Third Division, finishing last in its group.

== Honours ==
- Campeonato Alagoano
  - Winners (1): 2004
  - Runners-up (2): 2007, 2009
- Campeonato Alagoano Second Division
  - Winners (2): 1992, 1997

== Youth squad ==
The club was well known in Brazil because of his youth squad. Several famous players including among others Pepe and Luiz Gustavo were discovered by the club. Revealing new talented football players was one of the club's main priorities. The focus was on players between 15 and 22 years old.

The club's youth squad has competed in the Copa São Paulo de Futebol Júnior since 2000. In that year, the club was eliminated in the first round of the competition. In 2005, the club reached the third stage of the competition.

=== First Team ===
The first team as of 2011, consists of: Note: Flags indicate national team as defined under FIFA eligibility rules; some limited exceptions apply. Players may hold more than one non-FIFA nationality.

No.	Pos.	Nation	Player
—	DF	(Brazil) BRA	Buiú
—	DF	(Brazil) BRA	Selmo Lima
—	DF	(Brazil) BRA	Edson
—	DF	(Brazil) BRA	Gustavo
—	MF	(Brazil) BRA	Ataliba
—	MF	(Brazil) BRA	Pio

No.	Pos.	Nation	Player
—	MF	(Brazil) BRA	Johnny
—	MF	(Brazil) BRA	Robson
—	MF	(Brazil) BRA	Edson Sá
—	FW	(Brazil) BRA	Reinaldo
—	FW	(Brazil) BRA	Leo Macaé
—	FW	(Brazil) BRA	Zé Carlos

== Logo and colors ==
The club was named after Sport Club Corinthians Paulista, of São Paulo state. The logo was also very similar to the logo of the São Paulo state's club.

Corinthians Alagoano's official colors were black, white and red.

== Stadium ==
Home stadium was the Nelsão stadium, capacity 10,000.

== Anthem ==
The club's anthem was composed by Antônio Guimarães. It was sung by Carlos Moura.
