= Atalaia, Alagoas =

Municipality of Alagoas, Brazil

Atalaia
- Municipality
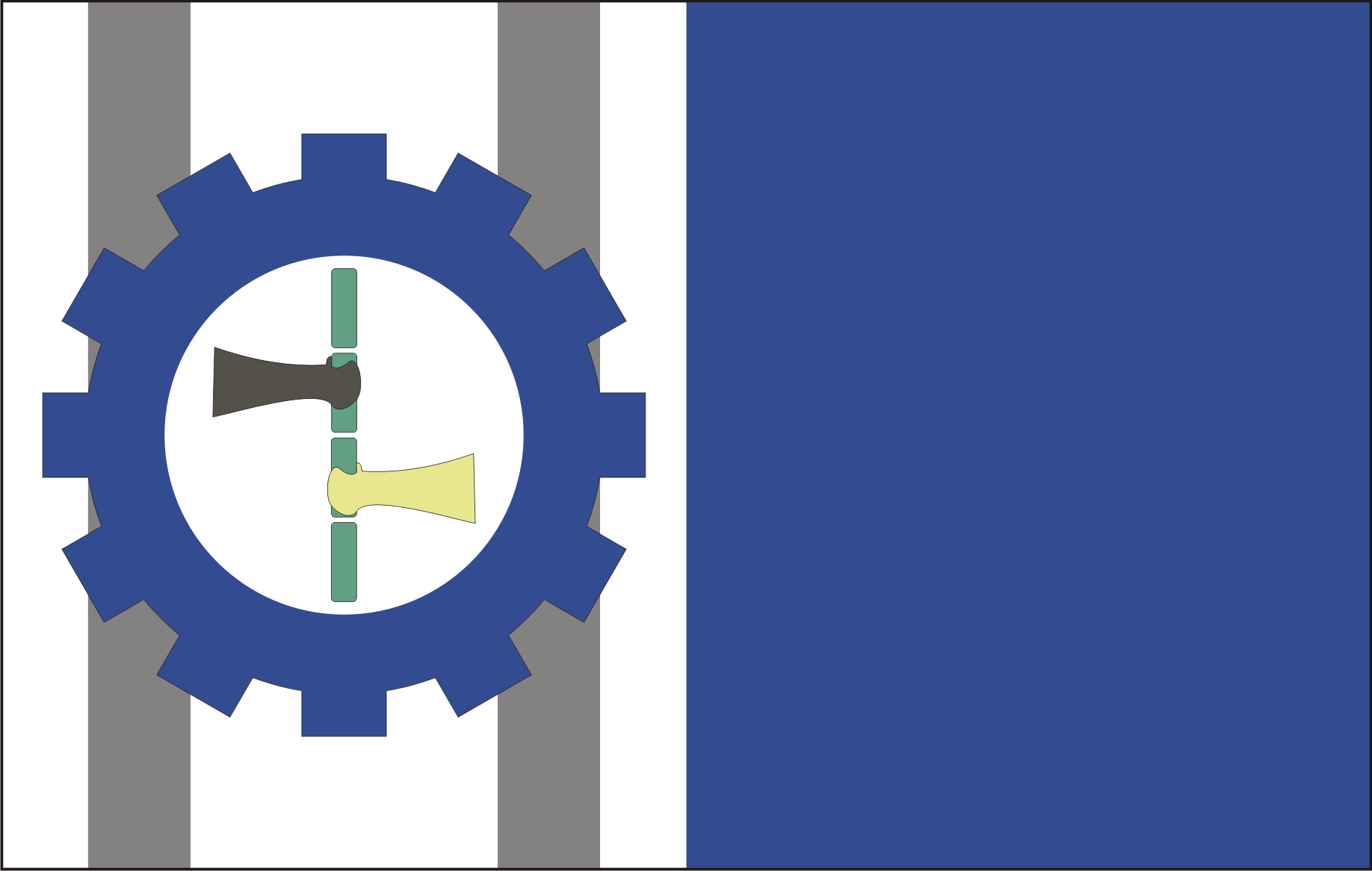
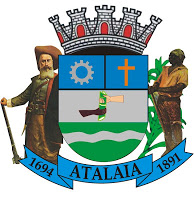
- Flag Coat of arms
- Nickname: Xaparatu
- Location of Atalaia in the State of Alagoas

- Location in Brazil
- Coordinates: 9°30′07″S 36°01′22″W
- Country: Brazil
- State: Alagoas

Population (2020)
  - Total: 47,365
- Time zone: UTC−3 (BRT)
- Website: Official website

Atalaia (Central northeastern portuguese pronunciation: [ˌataˈlajɐ]) is a municipality in the Brazilian state of Alagoas. Its population is 47,365 (2020) and its area is 532 km^{2} (205 sq mi).
