= 2010 Campeonato Mineiro =

Campeonato Mineiro
- Season: 2010

The 2010 Campeonato Mineiro, was the 96th season of Minas Gerais's top-flight football league.

== First stage ==
Pos	Team	Pld	W	D	L	GF	GA	GD	Pts	Qualification or relegation
1	Cruzeiro (A)	11	8	0	3	29	15	+14	24	Advanced to the final phase
2	Democrata (A)	11	7	2	2	22	13	+9	23	Advanced to the final phase
3	Atlético Mineiro (A)	11	6	4	1	29	14	+15	22	Advanced to the final phase
4	Tupi (A)	11	7	0	4	21	14	+7	21	Advanced to the final phase
5	Ipatinga (A)	11	6	3	2	21	11	+10	21	Advanced to the final phase
6	América Mineiro (A)	11	4	3	4	19	14	+5	15	Advanced to the final phase
7	Villa Nova (A)	11	4	3	4	10	15	−5	15	Advanced to the final phase
8	Uberaba (A)	11	4	3	4	14	21	−7	15	Advanced to the final phase
9	Caldense	11	2	4	5	12	22	−10	10	
10	América de Teófilo Otoni	11	1	4	6	12	16	−4	7	
11	Uberlândia (R)	11	1	2	8	13	27	−14	5	Relegated to the Módulo II
12	Ituiutaba (R)	11	1	2	8	4	24	−20	5	Relegated to the Módulo II

Rules for classification: 1) points; 2) goal difference; 3) number of goals scored.
(A) Advance to a further round; (R) Relegated

== Final phase ==
Quarterfinals
1	Cruzeiro	2	3	5
8	Uberaba	2	0	2
5	Ipatinga	2	1	3
4	Tupi	1	1	2
3	Atlético/MG*	3	2	5
6	América/MG	3	2	5
7	Villa Nova	2	0	2
2	Democrata	4	0	4

Semifinals
Cruzeiro	0	1	1
Ipatinga	0	3	3
Democrata	1	0	1
Atlético/MG	2	0	2

Final
Ipatinga	2	0	2
Atlético/MG	3	2	5
