= 2006 Campeonato Brasileiro Série B =

Campeonato Brasileiro Série B
- Season: 2006
- Champions: Atlético Mineiro
- Promoted: Atlético Mineiro; Sport; Náutico; América-RN
- Relegated: Paysandu; Guarani; São Raimundo; Vila Nova
- Goals scored: 1,090
- Average goals/game: 2.87
- Top goalscorer: Vanderlei (Gama) - 21

The Campeonato Brasileiro Série B 2006, namely the second division of the Brazilian League, was contested by 20 teams. The tournament started in April 2006 and ended on November 25 of 2006. The 20 teams played home and away matches against each other and, by the end of the year, the four best-ranked were promoted to the first division and the four worst-ranked were relegated to the third division.

== Final standings ==
Pos	Team	Pld	W	D	L	GF	GA	GD	Pts	Promotion or relegation
1	Atlético Mineiro	38	20	11	7	70	39	+31	71	Promoted to the 2007 Campeonato Brasileiro Série A
2	Sport Recife	38	18	10	10	57	36	+21	64	Promoted to the 2007 Campeonato Brasileiro Série A
3	Náutico	38	18	10	10	64	48	+16	64	Promoted to the 2007 Campeonato Brasileiro Série A
4	América de Natal	38	19	4	15	59	51	+8	61	Promoted to the 2007 Campeonato Brasileiro Série A
5	Paulista	38	17	10	11	72	51	+21	61	
6	Coritiba	38	16	11	11	64	51	+13	59	
7	Santo André	38	14	14	10	47	45	+2	56	
8	Brasiliense	38	15	8	15	66	51	+15	53	
9	Marília	38	13	11	14	58	58	0	50	
10	Ituano	38	12	14	12	49	48	+1	50	
11	Gama	38	14	6	18	52	62	−10	48	
12	Remo	38	13	7	18	50	60	−10	46	
13	Avaí	38	12	10	16	36	51	−15	46	
14	Portuguesa	38	11	12	15	47	58	−11	45	
15	Ceará	38	10	15	13	47	56	−9	45	
16	CRB	38	12	8	18	61	67	−6	44	
17	Paysandu	38	12	8	18	51	70	−19	44	Relegated to the 2007 Campeonato Brasileiro Série C
18	Guarani	38	11	14	13	53	61	−8	44 (Note: Guarani was punished by FIFA with the loss of 3 points)	Relegated to the 2007 Campeonato Brasileiro Série C
19	São Raimundo-AM	38	11	10	17	42	59	−17	43	Relegated to the 2007 Campeonato Brasileiro Série C
20	Vila Nova	38	11	9	18	45	68	−23	42	Relegated to the 2007 Campeonato Brasileiro Série C
