= Wellington Lima (footballer) =

Brazilian footballer (born 1990)

Personal information
- Full name: Wellington de Lima Gomes
- Date of birth: 21 April 1990 (age 36)
- Place of birth: Recife, Brazil
- Height: 1.91 m (6 ft 3 in)
- Position: Goalkeeper

Team information
- Current team: ABC

Senior career*
Years	Team	Apps	(Gls)
2009–2012	ABC	37	(0)
2012	→ Duque de Caxias (loan)		
2012–2017	Marítimo	6	(0)
2012–2017	Marítimo B	24	(0)
2016	→ NorthEast United (loan)	2	(0)
2017	SC Salgueiros	3	(0)
2017–2019	Globo	5	(0)
2020	Lagarto	7	(0)
2020	Campinense	6	(0)
2021	ABC	35	(0)
2022	Petro de Luanda		
2023–	ABC	3	(0)
- * Club domestic league appearances and goals as of 29 July 2023

Wellington de Lima Gomes (born 21 March 1990) is a Brazilian professional footballer who plays as a goalkeeper for ABC.
