= 2007 Campeonato Brasileiro Série C =

Campeonato Brasileiro Série C
- Season: 2007
- Champions: Bragantino
- Promoted: Bragantino; Bahia; Vila Nova-GO; ABC-RN
- Matches played: 392
- Goals scored: 1,022 (2.61 per match)

In 2007, the Campeonato Brasileiro Série C, the third division of the Brazilian League, was contested by 64 clubs, with the promotion of Bragantino, Bahia (lost Fonte Nova against Vila Nova), Vila Nova-GO, and ABC-RN, to the Campeonato Brasileiro Série B to be contested in 2008. No teams were relegated, since the fourth division in the Brazilian league was introduced only in 2009.

== Competition format ==
=== First stage ===
The 64 teams play in 16 groups of four. Within each group, the four teams play a double round robin, i.e. they play each other in home and away matches, totalling six matchdays. The two best ranked teams in each group qualify to the Second Stage.

=== Second stage ===
The 32 teams qualified from the First Stage play in eight groups of four. Within each group, the four teams play a double round robin, i.e. they play each other in home and away matches, totalling six matchdays. The two best ranked teams in each group qualify to the Third Stage.

=== Third stage ===
The 16 teams qualified from the Second Stage play in four groups of four. Within each group, the four teams play a double round robin, i.e. they play each other in home and away matches, totalling six matchdays. The two best ranked teams in each group qualify to the Final Stage.

=== Final stage ===
The eight teams qualified from the Third Stage are put together in a single group. They play a double round robin, i.e. they play each other in home and away matches, totalling fourteen matchdays. The four best ranked teams are automatically promoted to the Série B in 2008.

== Participating teams ==
The participating teams are sorted by state:

Acre
- Rio Branco

Alagoas
- ASA
- Coruripe

Amapá
- Amapá

Amazonas
- Fast Clube
- Nacional
- São Raimundo/AM

Bahia
- Atlético/BA
- Bahia
- Poções

Ceará
- Icasa
- Itapipoca

Distrito Federal
- Ceilândia
- Guará

Espírito Santo
- Jaguaré
- Linhares

Goiás
- Atlético Goianiense
- CRAC
- Itumbiara
- Vila Nova

Maranhão
- Imperatriz
- Sampaio Corrêa

Mato Grosso
- Cacerense
- Jaciara

Mato Grosso do Sul
- Águia Negra
- CENE

Minas Gerais
- Democrata de Governador Valadares
- Tupi
- Villa Nova

Pará
- Ananindeua
- Paysandu
- Tuna Luso

Paraíba
- Atlético/PB
- Nacional de Patos

Paraná
- Adap Galo Maringá
- Paranavaí
- Roma

Pernambuco
- Central de Caruaru
- Porto
- Vera Cruz

Piauí
- Barras
- River

Rio de Janeiro
- América/RJ
- Friburguense
- Madureira
- Volta Redonda

Rio Grande do Norte
- ABC
- Potiguar de Mossoró

Rio Grande do Sul
- Caxias
- Esportivo
- Ulbra (RS)

Rondônia
- Jaruense

Roraima
- São Raimundo/RR

Santa Catarina
- Chapecoense
- Joinville

São Paulo
- Bragantino
- Guarani
- Juventus
- Noroeste
- Rio Claro
- Sertãozinho

Sergipe
- América/SE
- Confiança

Tocantins
- Araguaína

== Stages of the competition ==
=== First stage ===
Group 1 (AC-AM-RO-RR)

Pos	Team	Pld	W	D	L	GF	GA	GD	Pts	Qualification
1	(Acre (state)) Rio Branco/AC	6	3	3	0	15	5	+10	12	Qualified to the second stage
2	(Amazonas (Brazilian state)) Fast Clube/AM	6	3	2	1	6	3	+3	11	Qualified to the second stage
3	(Rondônia) Jaruense/RO	6	1	2	3	7	14	−7	5	
4	(Roraima) São Raimundo/RR	6	1	1	4	8	14	−6	4	

Group 2 (AP-AM-PA)

Pos	Team	Pld	W	D	L	GF	GA	GD	Pts	Qualification
1	(Amazonas (Brazilian state)) Nacional/AM	6	3	2	1	9	6	+3	11	Qualified to the second stage
2	(Pará) Tuna Luso/PA	6	3	1	2	7	7	0	10	Qualified to the second stage
3	Amapá/AP	6	2	1	3	6	8	−2	7	
4	(Amazonas (Brazilian state)) São Raimundo/AM	6	1	2	3	5	7	−2	5	

Group 3 (MA-PA-TO)

Pos	Team	Pld	W	D	L	GF	GA	GD	Pts	Qualification
1	(Maranhão) Imperatriz/MA	6	2	4	0	4	2	+2	10	Qualified to the second stage
2	(Pará) Ananindeua/PA	6	2	3	1	6	6	0	9	Qualified to the second stage
3	(Pará) Paysandu/PA	6	0	1	5	3	9	−6	1	
4	(Tocantins) Araguaina/TO	6	3	2	1	8	4	+4	−1 (Note: Araguaina/TO was punished with the loss of 12 points)	

Notes:

Group 4 (CE-MA-PI)

Pos	Team	Pld	W	D	L	GF	GA	GD	Pts	Qualification
1	(Piauí) Barras/PI	6	3	2	1	9	5	+4	11	Qualified to the second stage
2	(Maranhão) Sampaio Corrêa/MA	6	2	3	1	5	5	0	9	Qualified to the second stage
3	(Piauí) River/PI	6	2	2	2	9	11	−2	8	
4	(Ceará) Itapipoca/CE	6	1	1	4	10	12	−2	4	

Group 5 (CE-PB-PE-RN)

Pos	Team	Pld	W	D	L	GF	GA	GD	Pts	Qualification
1	(Paraíba) Nacional/PB	6	3	2	1	8	6	+2	11	Qualified to the second stage
2	(Pernambuco) Porto/PE	6	2	1	3	8	10	−2	7	Qualified to the second stage
3	(Ceará) Icasa/CE	6	2	1	3	5	7	−2	7	
4	(Rio Grande do Norte) Potiguar/RN	6	1	4	1	10	8	+2	7	

Group 6 (PB-PE-RN)

Pos	Team	Pld	W	D	L	GF	GA	GD	Pts	Qualification
1	(Rio Grande do Norte) ABC/RN	6	4	1	1	13	6	+7	13	Qualified to the second stage
2	(Paraíba) Atlético/PB	6	3	1	2	4	3	+1	10	Qualified to the second stage
3	(Pernambuco) Central/PE	6	1	3	2	9	10	−1	6	
4	(Pernambuco) Vera Cruz/PE	6	1	1	4	1	10	−9	4	

Group 7 (AL-BA-SE)

Pos	Team	Pld	W	D	L	GF	GA	GD	Pts	Qualification
1	Bahia/BA	6	5	1	0	11	1	+10	16	Qualified to the second stage
2	(Sergipe) Confiança/SE	6	4	1	1	11	5	+6	13	Qualified to the second stage
3	(Sergipe) América/SE	6	1	1	4	1	7	−6	4	
4	(Alagoas) ASA/AL	6	0	1	5	3	13	−10	1	

Group 8 (AL-BA-ES)

Pos	Team	Pld	W	D	L	GF	GA	GD	Pts	Qualification
1	(Alagoas) Coruripe/AL	6	4	2	0	11	4	+7	14	Qualified to the second stage
2	(Espírito Santo) Linhares/ES	6	2	2	2	12	10	+2	8	Qualified to the second stage
3	(Bahia) Atlético/BA	6	1	3	2	7	11	−4	6	
4	(Bahia) Poções/BA	6	1	1	4	5	10	−5	4	

Group 9 (DF-GO-MT)

Pos	Team	Pld	W	D	L	GF	GA	GD	Pts	Qualification
1	(Goiás) Atlético/GO	6	4	0	2	8	4	+4	12	Qualified to the second stage
2	(Goiás) CRAC/GO	6	3	0	3	7	7	0	9	Qualified to the second stage
3	(Federal District (Brazil)) Ceilândia/DF	6	2	1	3	6	7	−1	7	
4	(Mato Grosso) Cacerense/MT	6	2	1	3	5	8	−3	7	

Group 10 (DF-GO-MT)

Pos	Team	Pld	W	D	L	GF	GA	GD	Pts	Qualification
1	(Goiás) Vila Nova/GO	6	4	1	1	12	5	+7	13	Qualified to the second stage
2	(Goiás) Itumbiara/GO	6	4	0	2	11	8	+3	12	Qualified to the second stage
3	(Mato Grosso) Jaciara/MT	6	3	1	2	14	9	+5	10	
4	(Federal District (Brazil)) Esportivo Guará/DF	6	0	0	6	3	18	−15	0	

Group 11 (ES-MG-RJ-SP)

Pos	Team	Pld	W	D	L	GF	GA	GD	Pts	Qualification
1	(Rio de Janeiro (state)) América/RJ	6	3	1	2	10	7	+3	10	Qualified to the second stage
2	(São Paulo (state)) Guarani/SP	6	3	1	2	8	7	+1	10	Qualified to the second stage
3	(Espírito Santo) Jaguaré/ES	6	2	1	3	12	12	0	7	
4	(Minas Gerais) Tupi/MG	6	2	1	3	8	12	−4	7	

Group 12 (RJ-SP)

Pos	Team	Pld	W	D	L	GF	GA	GD	Pts	Qualification
1	(São Paulo (state)) Rio Claro/SP	6	2	3	1	4	3	+1	9	Qualified to the second stage
2	(Rio de Janeiro (state)) Volta Redonda/RJ	6	2	2	2	6	6	0	8	Qualified to the second stage
3	(Rio de Janeiro (state)) Friburguense/RJ	6	1	4	1	5	5	0	7	
4	(São Paulo (state)) Noroeste/SP	6	1	3	2	5	6	−1	6	

Group 13 (MS-SP)

Pos	Team	Pld	W	D	L	GF	GA	GD	Pts	Qualification
1	(São Paulo (state)) Bragantino/SP	6	4	1	1	10	3	+7	13	Qualified to the second stage
2	(Mato Grosso do Sul) Águia Negra/MS	6	2	2	2	7	8	−1	8	Qualified to the second stage
3	(Mato Grosso do Sul) CENE/MS	6	2	2	2	6	7	−1	8	
4	(São Paulo (state)) Sertãozinho/SP	6	1	1	4	8	13	−5	4	

Group 14 (MG-RJ-SP)

Pos	Team	Pld	W	D	L	GF	GA	GD	Pts	Qualification
1	(Minas Gerais) Villa Nova/MG	6	2	3	1	12	6	+6	9	Qualified to the second stage
2	(Minas Gerais) Democrata-GV/MG	6	2	3	1	7	10	−3	9	Qualified to the second stage
3	(São Paulo (state)) Juventus/SP	6	1	5	0	3	2	+1	8	
4	(Rio de Janeiro (state)) Madureira/RJ	6	0	3	3	1	5	−4	3	

Group 15 (PR-RS-SC)

Pos	Team	Pld	W	D	L	GF	GA	GD	Pts	Qualification
1	(Paraná (state)) Roma/PR	6	4	2	0	10	3	+7	14	Qualified to the second stage
2	(Rio Grande do Sul) Ulbra/RS	6	2	3	1	9	5	+4	9	Qualified to the second stage
3	(Santa Catarina (state)) Chapecoense/SC	6	1	1	4	5	10	−5	4	
4	(Paraná (state)) Paranavaí/PR	6	0	4	2	4	10	−6	4	

Group 16 (PR-RS-SC)

Pos	Team	Pld	W	D	L	GF	GA	GD	Pts	Qualification
1	(Santa Catarina (state)) Joinville/SC	6	4	1	1	8	4	+4	13	Qualified to the second stage
2	(Rio Grande do Sul) Esportivo/RS	6	3	0	3	6	9	−3	9	Qualified to the second stage
3	(Paraná (state)) Adap Galo Maringá/PR	6	2	2	2	10	8	+2	8	
4	(Rio Grande do Sul) Caxias/RS	6	0	3	3	5	8	−3	3	

=== Second stage ===
Group 17 (AC-MA-PA)

Pos	Team	Pld	W	D	L	GF	GA	GD	Pts	Qualification
1	(Maranhão) Imperatriz/MA	6	3	1	2	9	4	+5	−2 (Note: Imperatriz/MA was expelled from the competition (lost 12 points on STJD))	
2	(Acre (state)) Rio Branco/AC	6	3	1	2	8	8	0	10	Qualified to the third stage
3	(Pará) Tuna Luso/PA	6	2	2	2	11	8	+3	8	Qualified to the third stage
4	(Maranhão) Sampaio Corrêa/MA	6	1	2	3	6	14	−8	5	

Notes:

Group 18 (AM-PA-PI)

Pos	Team	Pld	W	D	L	GF	GA	GD	Pts	Qualification
1	(Piauí) Barras/PI	6	3	2	1	9	5	+4	11	Qualified to the third stage
2	(Amazonas (Brazilian state)) Fast Clube/AM	6	3	2	1	13	10	+3	11	Qualified to the third stage
3	(Pará) Ananindeua/PA	6	3	1	2	12	10	+2	10	
4	(Amazonas (Brazilian state)) Nacional/AM	6	0	1	5	7	16	−9	1	

Group 19 (BA-ES-PB)

Pos	Team	Pld	W	D	L	GF	GA	GD	Pts	Qualification
1	Bahia/BA	6	4	1	1	16	4	+12	13	Qualified to the third stage
2	(Paraíba) Nacional/PB	6	4	0	2	8	8	0	12	Qualified to the third stage
3	(Paraíba) Atlético/PB	6	2	0	4	9	12	−3	6	
4	(Espírito Santo) Linhares/ES	6	1	1	4	6	14	−8	4	

Group 20 (AL-PE-RN-SE)

Pos	Team	Pld	W	D	L	GF	GA	GD	Pts	Qualification
1	(Alagoas) Coruripe/AL	6	4	1	1	8	4	+4	13	Qualified to the third stage
2	(Rio Grande do Norte) ABC/RN	6	4	0	2	8	7	+1	12	Qualified to the third stage
3	(Sergipe) Confiança/SE	6	2	2	2	4	4	0	8	
4	(Pernambuco) Porto/PE	6	0	1	5	3	8	−5	1	

Group 21 (GO-RJ)

Pos	Team	Pld	W	D	L	GF	GA	GD	Pts	Qualification
1	(Goiás) Atlético/GO	6	4	1	1	8	5	+3	13	Qualified to the third stage
2	(Rio de Janeiro (state)) América/RJ	6	3	1	2	8	7	+1	10	Qualified to the third stage
3	(Rio de Janeiro (state)) Volta Redonda/RJ	6	2	1	3	7	6	+1	7	
4	(Goiás) Itumbiara/GO	6	1	1	4	3	8	−5	4	

Group 22 (GO-SP)

Pos	Team	Pld	W	D	L	GF	GA	GD	Pts	Qualification
1	(Goiás) CRAC/GO	6	3	2	1	7	3	+4	11	Qualified to the third stage
2	(Goiás) Vila Nova/GO	6	3	0	3	9	9	0	9	Qualified to the third stage
3	(São Paulo (state)) Guarani/SP	6	2	2	2	6	5	+1	8	
4	(São Paulo (state)) Rio Claro/SP	6	2	0	4	8	13	−5	6	

Group 23 (MG-PR-RS-SP)

Pos	Team	Pld	W	D	L	GF	GA	GD	Pts	Qualification
1	(Rio Grande do Sul) Esportivo/RS	6	3	2	1	8	4	+4	11	Qualified to the third stage
2	(São Paulo (state)) Bragantino/SP	6	3	0	3	8	9	−1	9	Qualified to the third stage
3	(Paraná (state)) Roma/PR	6	2	3	1	5	3	+2	9	
4	(Minas Gerais) Democrata-GV/MG	6	1	1	4	8	13	−5	4	

Group 24 (MS-MG-RS-SC)

Pos	Team	Pld	W	D	L	GF	GA	GD	Pts	Qualification
1	(Rio Grande do Sul) Ulbra/RS	6	3	2	1	9	6	+3	11	Qualified to the third stage
2	(Minas Gerais) Villa Nova/MG	6	2	3	1	8	6	+2	9	Qualified to the third stage
3	(Santa Catarina (state)) Joinville/SC	6	2	2	2	8	5	+3	8	
4	(Mato Grosso do Sul) Águia Negra/MS	6	0	3	3	3	11	−8	3	

=== Third stage ===
Group 25 (AC-AM-BA-RN)

Pos	Team	Pld	W	D	L	GF	GA	GD	Pts	Qualification
1	(Rio Grande do Norte) ABC/RN	6	4	1	1	8	5	+3	13	Qualified to the final stage
2	Bahia/BA	6	3	1	2	10	8	+2	10	Qualified to the final stage
3	(Acre (state)) Rio Branco/AC	6	3	1	2	9	7	+2	10	
4	(Amazonas (Brazilian state)) Fast Clube/AM	6	0	1	5	5	12	−7	1	

Group 26 (AL-PA-PB-PI)

Pos	Team	Pld	W	D	L	GF	GA	GD	Pts	Qualification
1	(Piauí) Barras/PI	6	4	1	1	14	9	+5	13	Qualified to the final stage
2	(Paraíba) Nacional/PB	6	3	0	3	11	12	−1	9	Qualified to the final stage
3	(Alagoas) Coruripe/AL	6	2	1	3	7	7	0	7	
4	(Pará) Tuna Luso/PA	6	1	2	3	7	11	−4	5	

Group 27 (GO-MG-RS)

Pos	Team	Pld	W	D	L	GF	GA	GD	Pts	Qualification
1	(Goiás) Vila Nova/GO	6	3	3	0	11	7	+4	12	Qualified to the final stage
2	(Goiás) Atlético/GO	6	1	5	0	10	5	+5	8	Qualified to the final stage
3	(Minas Gerais) Villa Nova/MG	6	1	3	2	4	6	−2	6	
4	(Rio Grande do Sul) Esportivo/RS	6	0	3	3	5	12	−7	3	

Group 28 (GO-RJ-RS-SP)

Pos	Team	Pld	W	D	L	GF	GA	GD	Pts	Qualification
1	(Goiás) CRAC/GO	6	4	2	0	12	4	+8	14	Qualified to the final stage
2	(São Paulo (state)) Bragantino/SP	6	2	1	3	7	7	0	7	Qualified to the final stage
3	(Rio Grande do Sul) Ulbra/RS	6	2	1	3	8	10	−2	7	
4	(Rio de Janeiro (state)) América/RJ	6	1	2	3	9	15	−6	5	

=== Final stage ===
Group 29 (BA-GO-PB-PI-RN-SP)

Pos	Team	Pld	W	D	L	GF	GA	GD	Pts	Promotion
1	(São Paulo (state)) Bragantino/SP	14	7	5	2	21	13	+8	26	Promoted to the Série B
2	Bahia/BA	14	6	6	2	26	18	+8	24	Promoted to the Série B
3	(Goiás) Vila Nova/GO	14	7	2	5	26	19	+7	23	Promoted to the Série B
4	(Rio Grande do Norte) ABC/RN	14	7	2	5	20	21	−1	23	Promoted to the Série B
5	(Goiás) CRAC/GO	14	7	0	7	24	20	+4	21	
6	(Goiás) Atlético/GO	14	6	3	5	24	17	+7	21	
7	(Piauí) Barras/PI	14	2	4	8	15	31	−16	10	
8	(Paraíba) Nacional/PB	14	2	2	10	8	25	−17	8	

- Champion: Bragantino
- Runners-up: Bahia
- Third Place: Vila Nova
- Fourth Place: ABC de Natal

Note: On This Phase, The EC Bahia Lost the Fonte Nova in last game at home (25 November 2007) (2008–2014).

Bahia 0 × 0 Vila Nova:

Stadium – Estádio Octávio Mangabeira, Salvador, Bahia, Brazil

On 85 or 88 minutes, 13 people fell and 7 people died, because the collapse of the bleachers (see more in Portuguese.)

The biggest rival of Bahia promoted to first division in same year.
