= 2007 Campeonato Brasileiro Série B =

Campeonato Brasileiro Série B
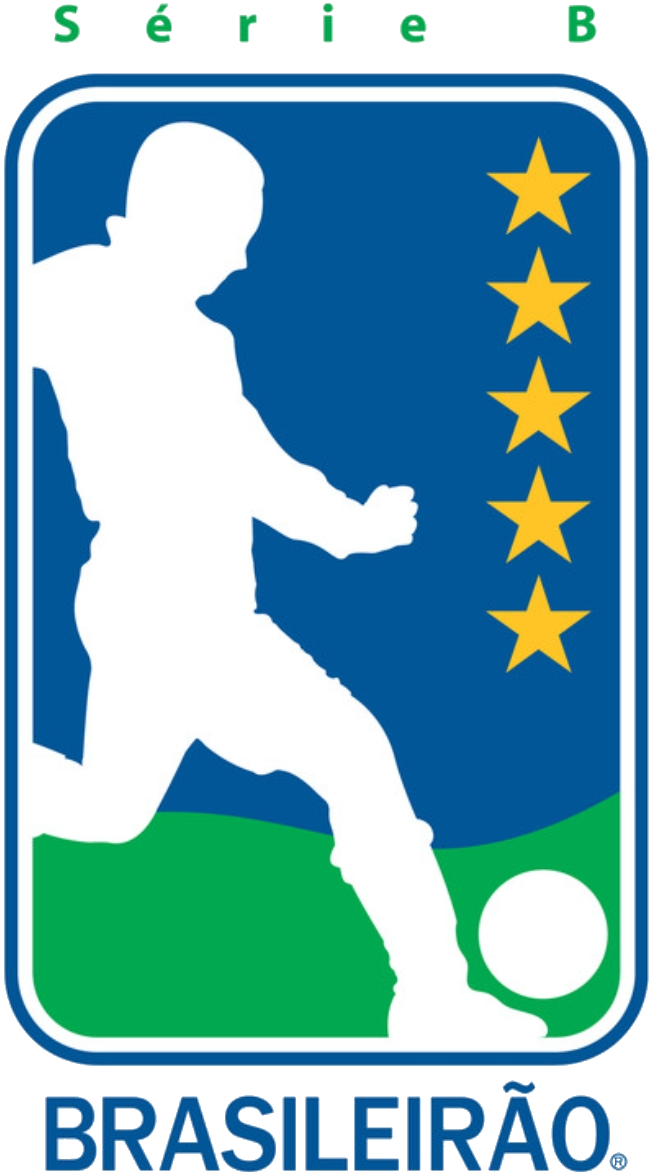
- Season: 2007
- Champions: Coritiba
- Promoted: Coritiba; Ipatinga; Portuguesa; Vitória
- Relegated: Paulista; Santa Cruz; Remo; Ituano
- Goals scored: 1,093
- Average goals/game: 2.88
- Top goalscorer: Alessandro (Ipatinga) - 25

The Campeonato Brasileiro Série B 2007, namely the second division of the Brazilian League, was contested by 20 teams. The tournament started in May, and reached its end on November 24. The 20 teams played home and away matches among each other and, by the end of the year, the four best-ranked (Coritiba, Ipatinga, Portuguesa and Vitória) were promoted to the first division and the four worst-ranked (Paulista, Santa Cruz, Remo, Ituano) were relegated to the third division.

== Standings ==
Pos	Team	Pld	W	D	L	GF	GA	GD	Pts	Promotion or relegation
1	Coritiba	38	21	6	11	54	41	+13	69	Promoted to 2008 Campeonato Brasileiro Série A
2	Ipatinga	38	20	7	11	60	41	+19	67	Promoted to 2008 Campeonato Brasileiro Série A
3	Portuguesa	38	17	12	9	63	46	+17	63	Promoted to 2008 Campeonato Brasileiro Série A
4	Vitória	38	18	5	15	68	50	+18	59	Promoted to 2008 Campeonato Brasileiro Série A
5	Fortaleza	38	17	5	16	51	46	+5	56	
6	Marília	38	17	8	13	66	61	+5	53 (Note: Marília was punished with the loss of 6 points)	
7	Criciúma	39	15	8	16	51	44	+7	53	
8	CRB	38	15	8	15	54	62	−8	53	
9	Brasiliense	38	14	11	13	57	53	+4	53	
10	São Caetano	38	13	14	11	45	39	+6	53	
11	Ponte Preta	38	13	13	12	58	55	+3	52	
12	Gama	38	14	9	15	53	56	−3	51	
13	Barueri	38	14	9	15	57	71	−14	51	
14	Santo André	38	13	12	13	51	50	+1	51	
15	Avaí	38	13	12	13	52	55	−3	51	
16	Ceará	38	13	11	14	58	58	0	50	
17	Paulista	38	12	9	17	58	61	−3	45	Relegated to 2008 Campeonato Brasileiro Série C
18	Santa Cruz	38	10	12	16	47	65	−18	42	Relegated to 2008 Campeonato Brasileiro Série C
19	Remo	38	10	6	22	53	69	−16	36	Relegated to 2008 Campeonato Brasileiro Série C
20	Ituano	38	8	9	21	41	74	−33	33	Relegated to 2008 Campeonato Brasileiro Série C

== Matches ==
Home \ Away	AVA	BRA	CEA	COR	CRB	CRI	FOR	GAM	GBA	IPA	ITU	MAR	PTA	PON	POR	REM	STA	STO	SCA	VIT
Avaí		4–2	2–0	1–0	4–2	1–0	0–2	1–0	1–1	1–0	4–0	1–1	2–0	2–3	1–1	2–3	0–0	1–0	1–1	1–0
Brasiliense	3–1		3–2	0–1	1–1	1–1	1–3	0–0	0–0	1–0	5–1	2–2	4–1	1–0	1–1	3–2	3–0	1–1	0–0	6–0
Ceará	1–0	1–3		2–2	2–1	1–1	0–1	3–0	2–1	2–0	3–0	1–1	2–1	4–1	0–0	2–1	3–0	1–2	2–3	0–3
Coritiba	1–0	2–1	2–0		2–1	1–0	1–0	1–1	4–1	1–0	2–0	2–3	3–1	2–1	2–0	2–1	2–0	2–1	0–1	2–2
CRB	3–1	3–1	0–4	1–0		2–0	1–2	1–1	4–1	0–0	3–1	0–1	1–1	1–0	1–0	3–1	2–2	1–2	1–0	4–3
Criciúma	2–1	2–1	0–0	3–1	3–0		2–0	4–0	2–0	0–1	3–0	2–1	1–2	0–2	2–2	0–0	2–0	0–2	3–2	2–0
Fortaleza	3–3	0–1	1–0	4–1	1–2	2–0		2–3	2–0	0–0	2–0	3–1	2–1	1–1	3–1	3–0	2–1	2–0	0–1	2–1
Gama	4–2	1–2	4–2	1–0	1–0	1–2	3–1		5–3	0–2	3–1	1–0	3–4	1–1	1–2	3–1	2–1	1–1	2–0	1–0
Grêmio Barueri	0–0	2–2	2–1	0–1	2–3	2–1	2–1	0–2		4–2	3–2	4–3	2–1	2–1	1–0	2–1	5–1	1–1	0–2	3–1
Ipatinga	2–2	3–0	4–1	1–0	4–0	0–2	1–1	3–0	0–0		5–1	3–2	2–0	3–1	1–0	3–0	2–1	2–1	1–0	1–0
Ituano	1–1	3–0	2–3	0–1	0–1	1–1	1–0	1–1	0–3	2–2		1–1	3–1	1–1	2–1	2–1	0–2	0–0	2–1	3–1
Marília	4–3	1–2	2–2	0–2	2–2	1–0	1–2	3–1	2–1	2–1	4–3		2–2	3–2	1–2	2–1	1–0	4–2	3–0	1–2
Paulista	0–1	2–0	0–0	3–2	2–2	3–1	1–0	2–1	7–0	2–5	2–3	0–2		2–2	2–2	2–0	2–2	3–1	0–1	3–0
Ponte Preta	0–0	2–2	1–1	1–1	2–1	3–2	2–0	1–0	2–2	5–1	2–1	1–2	1–1		2–4	1–1	6–0	2–1	1–1	0–3
Portuguesa	3–1	1–1	1–2	3–1	1–1	3–1	1–0	1–0	6–2	2–3	3–1	2–0	1–1	3–2		1–0	2–2	3–0	0–0	1–0
Remo	2–2	5–1	2–0	1–2	1–0	1–2	3–2	3–3	1–2	1–0	2–0	1–3	3–2	0–1	1–0		2–1	1–2	0–1	1–2
Santa Cruz	2–2	1–0	1–1	2–3	4–1	2–1	1–0	1–1	3–0	2–1	1–0	1–0	1–0	1–1	2–2	4–4		0–1	2–2	1–3
Santo André	3–0	1–2	5–2	0–0	1–3	3–3	1–1	1–0	1–1	0–0	3–0	1–2	1–0	0–2	2–2	4–3	3–0		1–1	0–2
São Caetano	0–1	1–0	3–3	1–1	4–0	1–0	1–0	0–0	1–1	0–1	2–2	1–1	2–0	0–1	1–2	3–1	2–2	1–1		2–0
Vitória	5–1	1–0	2–2	3–1	4–1	0–0	6–0	3–1	2–1	4–0	0–0	4–1	0–1	4–0	2–3	1–1	1–0	0–1	3–2	

Legend: Blue = home team win; Yellow = draw; Red = away team win.
