= 2022 Campeonato Alagoano =

Campeonato Alagoano
- Season: 2022
- Dates: 20 January – 13 April
- Champions: CRB (32nd title)
- Relegated: Jaciobá
- Copa do Brasil: ASA; CRB; CSA
- Série D: ASA; Cruzeiro de Arapiraca (via Copa Alagoas)
- Copa do Nordeste: CRB
- Copa do Nordeste qualification: ASA; CSA (via RNC)
- Matches played: 38
- Goals scored: 93 (2.45 per match)
- Top goalscorer: Rodrigo Rodrigues (8 goals)

The 2022 Campeonato Alagoano (officially the Série A Alagoano 2022 InoveBanco for sponsorship reasons) was the 92nd edition of the top football league in Alagoas organized by FAF. It began on 20 January and ended on 13 April 2022. CSA were the defending champions but were eliminated in the semi-finals.

The finals were played between CRB and ASA on 9 and 13 April 2022. CRB won 4–1 on aggregate securing their 32nd title.

== Format ==
In the first stage, each team played the other seven teams in a single round-robin tournament. Top four teams advanced to the semi-finals, while the bottom team was relegated to the 2023 Campeonato Alagoano Sub 23 – Série B. Semi-finals, third place finals and finals were played on a home-and-away two-legged basis with the best overall performance team hosting the second leg. If tied on aggregate, the penalty shoot-out would be used to determine the winners.

Champions qualified for the 2023 Copa do Brasil and 2023 Copa do Nordeste, while runners-up qualified for the 2023 Copa do Brasil. 2022 Campeonato Alagoano third place and 2022 Copa Alagoas champions (Cruzeiro de Arapiraca) played a two-legged play-off to determine the third team qualified for the 2023 Copa do Brasil. If tied on aggregate, the penalty shoot-out would be used to determine the winners. Best team not already qualified for 2023 Série A, Série B or Série C qualified for 2023 Campeonato Brasileiro Série D.

== Teams ==
Club	Home city	Manager
Aliança	Pilar	Rommel Vieira
ASA	Arapiraca	Jota
CRB	Maceió	Marcelo Cabo
Cruzeiro de Arapiraca	Arapiraca	Elenilson Santos
CSA	Maceió	Mozart
CSE	Palmeira dos Índios	Alyson Dantas
Jaciobá	Pão de Açúcar	Distéfano Brandão
Murici	Murici	Sinval

== First stage ==
Pos	Team	Pld	W	D	L	GF	GA	GD	Pts	Qualification or relegation
1	CSA	7	5	2	0	14	3	+11	17	Advance to Semi-finals
2	ASA	7	3	3	1	15	8	+7	12	Advance to Semi-finals
3	Murici	7	3	2	2	6	4	+2	11	Advance to Semi-finals
4	CRB	7	3	2	2	7	7	0	11	Advance to Semi-finals
5	CSE	7	2	2	3	12	6	+6	8	
6	Cruzeiro de Arapiraca	7	2	1	4	3	7	−4	7	
7	Aliança	7	1	3	3	5	8	−3	6	
8	Jaciobá (R)	7	1	1	5	3	22	−19	4	Relegated to 2023 Campeonato Alagoano Sub 23 – Série B

Source: FAF
Rules for classification: 1) Points; 2) Wins; 3) Goal difference; 4) Goals scored; 5) Head-to-head result (only between 2 teams); 6) Fewest red cards; 7) Fewest yellow cards; 8) Draw.
(R) Relegated

== Final stage ==
=== Bracket ===
Semi-finals
4	CRB (p)	0	1	1 (4)
1	CSA	1	0	1 (2)
3	Murici	1	0	1
2	ASA	2	2	4

Finals
4	CRB	2	2	4
2	ASA	1	0	1
Third place
3	Murici	0	0	0
1	CSA	2	8	10

=== Semi-finals ===
Team 1	Agg.	Team 2	1st leg	2nd leg
CRB	1–1 (4–2 p)	CSA	0–1	1–0
Murici	1–4	ASA	1–2	0–2

==== Matches ====
2 April 2022
17:00

CRB	0–1	CSA
	Report	Cedric 75'

Estádio Rei Pelé, Maceió
Attendance: 6,492
Referee: Anderson Daronco (Rio Grande do Sul)

6 April 2022
20:00

CSA	0–1	CRB
	Report	Anselmo Ramon 41'
Penalties
Cedric (penalty scored); Lucas Barcelos (penalty missed); Bruno Mota (penalty scored); Osvaldo (penalty missed)	2–4	(penalty scored) Anselmo Ramon; (penalty scored) Reginaldo; (penalty scored) Marcinho; (penalty scored) Diogo Silva

Estádio Rei Pelé, Maceió
Attendance: 11,893
Referee: Bruno Arleu de Araújo (Rio de Janeiro)

CRB qualified for 2023 Copa do Brasil

30 March 2022
20:00

Murici	1–2	ASA
Soares 54'	Report	Xande 20'; Marcinho 90+3'

Estádio José Gomes da Costa, Murici
Attendance: 727
Referee: Rafael Carlos Salgueiro Lima

3 April 2022
16:00

ASA	2–0	Murici
Júnior Viçosa 23'; Adalberto 48' (o.g.)	Report

Estádio Municipal Coaracy da Mata Fonseca, Arapiraca
Attendance: 2,300
Referee: José Ricardo Vasconcellos Laranjeira

ASA qualified for 2023 Copa do Brasil

=== 3rd place final ===
9 April 2022
16:00

Murici	0–2	CSA
	Report	Didira 10'; Marcel 45+1'

Estádio José Gomes da Costa, Murici
Attendance: 396
Referee: José Ricardo Vasconcellos Laranjeira

12 April 2022
16:15

CSA	8–0	Murici
Rodrigo Rodrigues 10' (pen.), 55', 63', 78'; Douglas 22'; Marco Túlio 49'; Didira 61' (pen.); Marcel 87'	Report

Estádio Rei Pelé, Maceió
Attendance: 1,128
Referee: Denis da Silva Ribeiro Serafim

=== Finals ===
9 April 2022
17:00

CRB	2–1	ASA
Vico 10'; Gilvan 88'	Report	Xande 47'

Estádio Rei Pelé, Maceió
Attendance: 12,038
Referee: Rafael Traci (Santa Catarina)

CRB	ASA

GK	12	(Brazil) Diogo Silva
DF	2	(Brazil) Reginaldo		(substituted off) 86'
DF	3	(Brazil) Gum (c)
DF	4	(Brazil) Gilvan
DF	6	(Brazil) Guilherme Romão
MF	5	(Brazil) Claudinei
MF	8	(Brazil) Marthã		(substituted off) 69'
MF	10	(Brazil) Vico		(substituted off) 79'
FW	7	(Brazil) Marcinho		(substituted off) 69'
FW	9	(Brazil) Anselmo Ramon
FW	11	(Brazil) Richard	(yellow card) 22'	(substituted off) 79'
Substitutes:
GK	1	(Brazil) Vitor Caetano
GK	23	(Brazil) Fábio
DF	13	(Brazil) Wellington Carvalho
DF	14	(Brazil) Diego Ivo
DF	15	(Brazil) Iago Mendonça
DF	16	(Brazil) Bryan
DF	17	(Brazil) Raul Prata		(substituted in) 69'
MF	18	(Brazil) Jalysson
MF	19	(Brazil) Rafael Longuine		(substituted in) 79'
MF	21	(Brazil) Lucas Bonete		(substituted in) 79'
MF	22	(Brazil) Gustavo Apis		(substituted in) 69'
FW	20	(Brazil) Brall		(substituted in) 86'
Coach:
(Brazil) Marcelo Cabo

GK	23	(Brazil) Railson
DF	2	(Brazil) Michel Tiago
DF	3	(Brazil) Cristian Lucca	(yellow card) 44'
DF	4	(Brazil) Fábio Aguiar
DF	16	(Brazil) Wendel
MF	21	(Brazil) Jorginho
MF	8	(Brazil) Fidélis (c)		(substituted off) 81'
MF	7	(Brazil) Roger Gaúcho		(substituted off) 70'
MF	10	(Brazil) Feijão		(substituted off) 81'
MF	11	(Brazil) Xande		(substituted off) 70'
FW	22	(Brazil) Júnior Viçosa		(substituted off) 55'
Substitutes:
GK	12	(Brazil) Luiz Mach
DF	5	(Brazil) Marcos Antônio
DF	6	(Brazil) Assis		(substituted in) 70'
DF	14	(Brazil) Gutti		(substituted in) 81'
DF	20	(Brazil) Benê
MF	13	(Brazil) Edson Magal		(substituted in) 55'
MF	17	(Brazil) Magdiel		(substituted in) 81'
FW	9	(Brazil) Lucas Gaspar		(substituted in) 70'
FW	15	(Brazil) Café
FW	18	(Brazil) Matheuzinho
FW	19	(Brazil) Marcinho
Coach:
(Brazil) Jota

Assistant referees:
Bruno Boschilia (Paraná)
Leila Naiara Moreira da Cruz (Distrito Federal)
Fourth official:
Deborah Cecília Cruz Correia (Pernambuco)
Video assistant referee:
Marco Aurélio Augusto Fazekas Ferreira (Minas Gerais)
Assistant video assistant referees:
Felipe Alan Costa de Oliveira (Minas Gerais)

13 April 2022
20:00

ASA	0–2	CRB
	Report	Anselmo Ramon 64'; Gum 68'

Estádio Municipal Coaracy da Mata Fonseca, Arapiraca
Attendance: 6,295
Referee: Flávio Rodrigues de Souza (São Paulo)

ASA	CRB

GK	23	(Brazil) Railson
DF	2	(Brazil) Michel Tiago
DF	3	(Brazil) Cristian Lucca
DF	4	(Brazil) Fábio Aguiar
DF	16	(Brazil) Wendel
MF	21	(Brazil) Jorginho	(yellow card) 45+2'	(substituted off) 46'
MF	8	(Brazil) Fidélis (c)		(substituted off) 65'
MF	7	(Brazil) Roger Gaúcho
MF	10	(Brazil) Feijão		(substituted off) 39'
MF	11	(Brazil) Xande		(substituted off) 80'
FW	22	(Brazil) Júnior Viçosa	(yellow card) 32'	(substituted off) 80'
Substitutes:
GK	12	(Brazil) Luiz Mach
DF	5	(Brazil) Marcos Antônio
DF	6	(Brazil) Assis		(substituted in) 39'
DF	14	(Brazil) Gutti
DF	15	(Brazil) Benê
MF	13	(Brazil) Edson Magal		(substituted in) 46'
MF	17	(Brazil) Magdiel
FW	9	(Brazil) Lucas Gaspar		(substituted in) 65'
FW	18	(Brazil) Matheuzinho
FW	19	(Brazil) Marcinho		(substituted in) 80'
FW	20	(Brazil) Café		(substituted in) 80'
Coach:
(Brazil) Jota

GK	12	(Brazil) Diogo Silva
DF	2	(Brazil) Raul Prata
DF	3	(Brazil) Gum (c)
DF	4	(Brazil) Gilvan
DF	6	(Brazil) Guilherme Romão
MF	5	(Brazil) Claudinei		(substituted off) 80'
MF	8	(Brazil) Yago	(yellow card) 24'	(substituted off) 80'
MF	10	(Brazil) Rafael Longuine		(substituted off) 63'
FW	11	(Brazil) Vico		(substituted off) 46'
FW	9	(Brazil) Anselmo Ramon
FW	7	(Brazil) Richard		(substituted off) 89'
Substitutes:
GK	1	(Brazil) Vitor Caetano
GK	23	(Brazil) Fábio
DF	13	(Brazil) Iago Mendonça
DF	14	(Brazil) Diego Ivo
DF	15	(Brazil) Wellington Carvalho
DF	16	(Brazil) Reginaldo		(substituted in) 46'
DF	20	(Brazil) Bryan
MF	17	(Brazil) Jalysson		(substituted in) 80'
MF	19	(Brazil) Lucas Bonete
MF	21	(Brazil) Marthã		(substituted in) 80'
MF	22	(Brazil) Gustavo Apis	(yellow card) 68'	(substituted in) 63'
FW	18	(Brazil) Brall		(substituted in) 89'
Coach:
(Brazil) Marcelo Cabo

Assistant referees:
Bruno Raphael Pires (Goiás)
Fabrini Bevilaqua Costa (São Paulo)
Fourth official:
Charly Wendy Straub Deretti (Santa Catarina)
Video assistant referee:
Emerson de Almeida Ferreira (Minas Gerais)
Assistant video assistant referees:
Frederico Soares Vilarinho (Minas Gerais)

As champions, CRB qualified for 2023 Copa do Nordeste

== 2023 Copa do Brasil play-off ==
23 April 2022
19:00

Cruzeiro de Arapiraca	1–2	CSA
Bruno Bacco 18'	Report	Lucas Barcelos 90'; Didira 90+1'

Estádio Municipal Coaracy da Mata Fonseca, Arapiraca
Attendance: 359
Referee: Rafael Carlos Salgueiro Lima

2 May 2022
19:00

CSA	3–0	Cruzeiro de Arapiraca
Didira 20'; Marco Túlio 26'; Lucas Barcelos 32'	Report

Estádio Rei Pelé, Maceió
Attendance: 1,193
Referee: Denis da Silva Ribeiro Serafim

CSA qualified for 2023 Copa do Brasil

== Overall table ==
Pos	Team	Pld	W	D	L	GF	GA	GD	Pts	Qualification or relegation
1	CRB	11	6	2	3	12	9	+3	20	Champions and 2023 Copa do Brasil
2	ASA	11	5	3	3	20	13	+7	18	Runners-up, 2023 Copa do Brasil and 2023 Série D
3	CSA	13	10	2	1	30	5	+25	32	2023 Copa do Brasil
4	Murici	11	3	2	6	7	18	−11	11	
5	CSE	7	2	2	3	12	6	+6	8	
6	Cruzeiro de Arapiraca (Note: Cruzeiro de Arapiraca qualified for the Série D by winning the 2022 Copa Alagoas.)	9	2	1	6	4	12	−8	7	2023 Série D
7	Aliança	7	1	3	3	5	8	−3	6	
8	Jaciobá	7	1	1	5	3	22	−19	4	Relegation to the 2023 Campeonato Alagoano Sub 23 – Série B

Source: FAF
Rules for classification: 1) Points; 2) Wins; 3) Goal difference; 4) Goals scored; 5) Head-to-head result (only between 2 teams); 6) Fewest red cards; 7) Fewest yellow cards; 8) Draw.

== Top goalscorers ==
Rank	Player	Team	Goals
1	Rodrigo Rodrigues	CSA	8
2	Feijão	ASA	6
3	Didira	CSA	5
4	Anselmo Ramon	CRB	4
5	Júnior Viçosa	ASA	3
5	Lucas Barcelos	CSA	3
5	Marco Túlio	CSA	3
5	Xande	ASA	3
