= 2024 Sport Club do Recife season =

Sport Recife
2024 season
- Chairman: Yuri Romão
- Manager: Mariano Soso; César Lucena (c); Guto Ferreira; Pepa
- Stadium: Ilha do Retiro; Arena Pernambuco
- Série B: 3rd (promoted)
- Pernambucano: Champions (44th title)
- Copa do Brasil: Third round
- Copa do Nordeste: Semi final
- Top goalscorer: League: Fabricio Domínguez (10); All: Gustavo Coutinho (17)
Home colours	Away colours

The 2024 season was Sport's 120th season in the club's history. Sport competed in the Campeonato Pernambucano, Copa do Nordeste, Série B and Copa do Brasil.

== Squad ==
As of 21 August 2024

Note: Flags indicate national team as defined under FIFA eligibility rules; some limited exceptions apply. Players may hold more than one non-FIFA nationality.

No.	Pos.	Nation	Player
1	GK	BRA	Vitor Caetano
2	DF	BRA	Matheus Ribeiro
3	DF	ECU	Luis Segovia (on loan from Botafogo)
4	DF	BRA	Saimon
5	MF	BRA	Lucas Kallyel
6	MF	BRA	Caio César
7	FW	BRA	Mike
8	MF	BRA	Gegê
9	FW	BRA	Anselmo Ramon
10	FW	BRA	Rafael Bilú
11	DF	BRA	Jorge
12	GK	BRA	Matheus Albino
13	DF	BRA	Willian Formiga (on loan from Ceará)
14	FW	BRA	Chay (on loan from Botafogo)
16	MF	BRA	Raí (on loan from Botafogo)
17	MF	BRA	Rômulo
20	MF	BRA	Vinícius Barata
21	FW	BRA	Jailson Cauã
23	GK	BRA	Fábio Henrique
26	DF	BRA	Gustavo Henrique (on loan from Bahia)
30	FW	URU	Facundo Labandeira

No.	Pos.	Nation	Player
32	DF	BRA	Hereda
33	MF	BRA	João Pedro (on loan from Vitória)
34	DF	BRA	Darlisson
35	MF	BRA	Marco Antônio
37	DF	BRA	Wanderson
38	FW	BRA	Léo Pereira
48	DF	BRA	Erik
50	MF	BRA	Baranhas
52	FW	BRA	Rodriguinho
66	DF	BRA	Ryan (on loan from Bahia)
70	DF	BRA	Wallace
75	FW	BRA	Kleiton (on loan from Athletico Paranaense)
77	DF	BRA	Vitinho (on loan from Grêmio)
98	MF	BRA	Falcão
99	FW	BRA	Getúlio (on loan from Tombense)
—	GK	BRA	Pablo
—	DF	BRA	Fábio Alemão
—	DF	BRA	Heron (on loan from Atlético Goianiense)
—	MF	BRA	Michel
—	FW	BRA	Bruno Dentinho

== Statistics ==
=== Overall ===
Games played	65 (13 Pernambucano, 10 Copa do Nordeste, 4 Copa do Brasil, 38 Série B)
Games won	35 (8 Pernambucano, 6 Copa do Nordeste, 2 Copa do Brasil, 19 Série B)
Games drawn	15 (3 Pernambucano, 2 Copa do Nordeste, 1 Copa do Brasil, 9 Série B)
Games lost	15 (2 Pernambucano, 2 Copa do Nordeste, 1 Copa do Brasil, 10 Série B)
Goals scored	101
Goals conceded	61
Goal difference	+40
Best result (goal difference)	4–0 (A) v Trem – Copa do Brasil – 2024.02.28; 4–0 (H) v Guarani – Série B – 2024.10.24; 4–0 (A) v Ponte Preta – Série B – 2024.11.16
Worst result (goal difference)	1–4 (H) v Fortaleza – Copa do Nordeste – 2024.05.26
Top scorer	Gustavo Coutinho (17)

Source: Sport Recife official website

=== Goalscorers ===
Place	Pos.	Nat.	No.	Name	Campeonato Pernambucano	Copa do Nordeste	Copa do Brasil	Série B	Total
1	FW	(Brazil)	9	Gustavo Coutinho	4	5	1	7	17
2	FW	(Brazil)	30	Chrystian Barletta	0	3	2	9	14
3	MF	(Uruguay)	8	Fabricio Domínguez	0	1	0	10	11
=	FW	(Brazil)	99	Zé Roberto	2	2	0	7	11
4	FW	(Argentina)	59	Christian Ortiz	0	1	0	4	5
5	MF	(Argentina)	10	Alan Ruiz	2	0	1	1	4
=	DF	(Brazil)	6	Felipinho	2	1	0	1	4
=	MF	(Brazil)	19	Lucas Lima	0	1	0	3	4
=	DF	(Brazil)	15	Rafael Thyere	1	1	0	2	4
=	FW	(Brazil)	11	Romarinho	0	2	1	1	4
6	MF	(Brazil)	7	Fabinho	1	0	0	2	3
7	MF	(Brazil)	20	Arthur Caíke	2	0	0	0	2
=	DF	(Brazil)	44	Chico	0	0	0	2	2
=	MF	(Argentina)	5	Julián Fernández	0	0	0	2	2
=	DF	(Brazil)	40	Luciano Castán	0	0	1	1	2
=	DF	(Brazil)	54	Pedro Lima	1	1	0	0	2
=	MF	(Brazil)	18	Wellington Silva	0	0	0	2	2
8	MF	(Brazil)	47	Fábio Matheus	1	0	0	0	1
=	DF	(Brazil)	16	Igor Cariús	0	0	0	1	1
=	DF	(Brazil)	2	Lucas Ramon	1	0	0	0	1
=	MF	(Brazil)	17	Pedro Vilhena	1	0	0	0	1
=	DF	(Brazil)	13	Renzo	1	0	0	0	1
=	DF	(Venezuela)	28	Roberto Rosales	0	0	0	1	1
				Own goals	0	1	0	1	2
				Total	19	19	6	57	101

=== Managers performance ===
Name	From	To	P	W	D	L	GF	GA	Avg%	Ref
(Argentina) Mariano Soso	13 January 2024	23 July 2024	42	23	10	9	62	38	62%	
(Brazil) César Lucena (c)	27 July 2024	2 September 2024	2	2	0	0	6	3	100%	
(Brazil) Guto Ferreira	2 August 2024	27 August 2024	5	1	1	3	4	7	26%	
(Portugal) Pepa	7 September 2024	24 November 2024	16	9	4	3	29	13	64%	

(c) Indicates the caretaker manager

=== Home record ===
São Lourenço da Mata	Recife
Arena Pernambuco	Ilha do Retiro
Capacity: 44,300	Capacity: 32,983
28 matches (16 wins 7 draws 5 losses)	6 matches (4 wins 1 draw 1 loss)

== Official Competitions ==
=== Campeonato Pernambucano ===
==== First stage ====
13 January 2024 1	Petrolina	0–1	Sport	São Lourenço da Mata
16:00 (UTC-3)		Report	Zé Roberto 56' (pen.)	Stadium: Estádio Governador Carlos Wilson Campos (Arena Pernambuco); Attendance: 5,083; Referee: Deborah Cecília

17 January 2024 2	Sport	2–4	Retrô	São Lourenço da Mata
19:00 (UTC-3)	Arthur Caíke 20'; Felipinho 81'	Report	Luisinho 19', 31'; Radsley 39'; Fernandinho 47'	Stadium: Estádio Governador Carlos Wilson Campos (Arena Pernambuco); Attendance: 8,897; Referee: Rodrigo Pereira

20 January 2024 3	Sport	2–1	Santa Cruz	São Lourenço da Mata
16:30 (UTC-3)	Gustavo Coutinho 40'; Fábio Matheus 81'	Report	Thiaguinho 56'	Stadium: Estádio Governador Carlos Wilson Campos (Arena Pernambuco); Attendance: 20,860; Referee: Rodrigo Pereira

25 January 2024 4	Maguary	0–1	Sport	Recife
20:00 (UTC-3)		Report	Gustavo Coutinho 35'	Stadium: Estádio Eládio de Barros Carvalho (Aflitos); Attendance: 3,138; Referee: Paulo Belence Alves dos Prazeres Filho

29 January 2024 5	Sport	2–0	Afogados da Ingazeira	São Lourenço da Mata
20:30 (UTC-3)	Pedro Vilhena 26'; Zé Roberto 45' (pen.)	Report		Stadium: Estádio Governador Carlos Wilson Campos (Arena Pernambuco); Attendance: 8,568; Referee: Michelangelo Martins de Almeida Junior

1 February 2024 6	Flamengo de Arcoverde	0–3	Sport	Caruaru
21:00 (UTC-3)		Report	Arthur Caíke 7'; Fabinho 36'; Pedro Lima 85'	Stadium: Estádio Luiz José de Lacerda (Lacerdão); Attendance: 3,107; Referee: Luiz Cláudio Sobral

6 February 2024 7	Sport	4–1	Central	São Lourenço da Mata
20:30 (UTC-3)	Lucas Ramon 47'; Gustavo Coutinho 54'; Renzo 62'; Alan Ruiz 65'	Report	Júnior Pirambu 69'	Stadium: Estádio Governador Carlos Wilson Campos (Arena Pernambuco); Attendance: 6,818; Referee: Paulo Belence Alves dos Prazeres Filho

17 February 2024 8	Sport	1–0	Porto	São Lourenço da Mata
16:30 (UTC-3)	Alan Ruiz 23'	Report		Stadium: Estádio Governador Carlos Wilson Campos (Arena Pernambuco); Attendance: 10,132; Referee: Michelangelo Martins de Almeida

24 February 2024 9	Náutico	1–0	Sport	Recife
16:30 (UTC-3)	Patrick Allan 58'	Report		Stadium: Estádio Eládio de Barros Carvalho (Aflitos); Attendance: 10,318; Referee: Paulo Belence Alves dos Prazeres Filho

==== Semi-finals ====
9 March 2024	Santa Cruz	1–1	Sport	Recife
16:30 (UTC-3)	Lucas Siqueira 45'	Report	Felipinho 90+26'	Stadium: Estádio José do Rego Maciel (Arruda); Attendance: 35,601; Referee: Diego Fernando Silva de Lima

16 March 2024	Sport	0–0 (5–3 p)	Santa Cruz	São Lourenço da Mata
16:30 (UTC-3)		Report		Stadium: Estádio Governador Carlos Wilson Campos (Arena Pernambuco); Attendance: 45,492; Referee: Deborah Cecília Cruz Correia
	Penalties
	Gustavo Coutinho (penalty scored); Zé Roberto (penalty scored); Tití Ortiz (penalty scored); Pablo Dyego (penalty scored); Chrystian Barletta (penalty scored)		(penalty scored) Lucas Siqueira; (penalty scored) Gilvan; (penalty missed) Toty; (penalty scored) Gabriel Cardoso

==== Finals ====
30 March 2024	Náutico	0–2	Sport	Recife
16:30 (UTC-3)		Report	Rafael Thyere 56'; Gustavo Coutinho 66'	Stadium: Estádio Eládio de Barros Carvalho (Aflitos); Attendance: 13,603; Referee: Diego Fernando

6 April 2024	Sport	0–0	Náutico	São Lourenço da Mata
16:30 (UTC-3)		Report		Stadium: Estádio Governador Carlos Wilson Campos (Arena Pernambuco); Attendance: 45,500; Referee: Rodrigo Pereira

==== Record ====
Final Position	Points	Matches	Wins	Draws	Losses	Goals For	Goals Away	Avg%
1st	27	13	8	3	2	19	8	69%

=== Copa do Nordeste ===
==== Group stage ====
4 February 2024 1	Bahia	2–1	Sport	Salvador
16:00 (UTC-3)	Thaciano 18'; Rafael Ratão 90+6'	Report	Gustavo Coutinho 73'	Stadium: Itaipava Arena Fonte Nova; Attendance: 47,138; Referee: Paulo José Souza Mourão

9 February 2024 2	Sport	3–1	Treze	São Lourenço da Mata
19:00 (UTC-3)	Rafael Castro 65' (o.g.); Gustavo Coutinho 72'; Pedro Lima 90+3'	Report	Xandy 63'	Stadium: Estádio Governador Carlos Wilson Campos (Arena Pernambuco); Attendance: 10,004; Referee: Emerson Souza Silva

14 February 2024 3	Itabaiana	1–2	Sport	Aracaju
19:00 (UTC-3)	Matheus 28'	Report	Lucas Lima 72'; Zé Roberto 84'	Stadium: Estádio Lourival Baptista (Batistão); Referee: Leonilson Fernandes Trigueiro Filho

21 February 2024 4	Sport	1–1	Fortaleza	São Lourenço da Mata
21:30 (UTC-3)	Gustavo Coutinho 87' (pen.)	Report	Moisés 45+1'	Stadium: Estádio Governador Carlos Wilson Campos (Arena Pernambuco); Attendance: 25,005; Referee: Wallas Martins Lopes

6 March 2024 5	Altos	1–2	Sport	Teresina
21:30 (UTC-3)	Arlan 13'	Report	Chrystian Barletta 4', 32'	Stadium: Estádio Lindolfo Monteiro; Attendance: 891; Referee: Douglas Magno de Melo Pereira

20 March 2024 6	Sport	2–2	Náutico	São Lourenço da Mata
21:30 (UTC-3)	Ortiz 31'; Romarinho 71'	Report	Sousa 27'; Nassom 90+4' (o.g.)	Stadium: Estádio Governador Carlos Wilson Campos (Arena Pernambuco); Attendance: 0 Referee: Emerson Ricardo de Almeida Andrade

23 March 2024 7	ABC	0–2	Sport	Natal
20:30 (UTC-3)		Report	Romarinho 73'; Zé Roberto 90+9'	Stadium: Estádio Maria Lamas Farache (Frasqueirão); Attendance: 1,974; Referee: Paulo José Souza Mourão

27 March 2024 8	Sport	3–0	Juazeirense	São Lourenço da Mata
21:30 (UTC-3)	Gustavo Coutinho 36'; Chrystian Barletta 63'; Domínguez 71'	Report		Stadium: Estádio Governador Carlos Wilson Campos (Arena Pernambuco); Attendance: 9,118; Referee: Léo Simão Holanda

==== Quarter-final ====
10 April 2024	Sport	2–1	Ceará	São Lourenço da Mata
21:30 (UTC-3)	Felipinho 43'; Rafael Thyere 90+2'	Report	Recalde 64'	Stadium: Estádio Governador Carlos Wilson Campos (Arena Pernambuco); Attendance: 21,366; Referee: Afro Rocha de Carvalho Filho

==== Semi-final ====
26 May 2024	Sport	1–4	Fortaleza	São Lourenço da Mata
18:00 (UTC-3)	Gustavo Coutinho 83'	Report	Moisés 10', 19', 43'; Hércules 21'	Stadium: Estádio Governador Carlos Wilson Campos (Arena Pernambuco); Attendance: 35.773; Referee: Caio Max Augusto Vieira

==== Record ====
Final Position	Points	Matches	Wins	Draws	Losses	Goals For	Goals Away	Avg%
4th	20	10	6	2	2	19	13	66%

=== Copa do Brasil ===
==== First round ====
28 February 2024	Trem	0–4	Sport	Macapá
21:30 (UTC-3)		Report	Romarinho 5'; Alan Ruiz 34'; Gustavo Coutinho 48'; Chrystian Barletta 66'	Stadium: Estádio Olímpico Milton de Souza Corrêa (Zerão); Attendance: 1,938; Referee: Felipe Fernandes de Lima

==== Second round ====
13 March 2024	Sport	1–1 (5–4 p)	Murici	São Lourenço da Mata
19:00 (UTC-3)	Luciano Castán 18'	Report	Alex Santos 90+4'	Stadium: Estádio Governador Carlos Wilson Campos (Arena Pernambuco); Attendance: 0 Referee: Jonathan Benkenstein Pinheiro
	Penalties
	Gustavo Coutinho (penalty scored); Lucas Lima (penalty scored); Tití Ortiz (penalty scored); Chrystian Barletta (penalty scored); Fabricio Domínguez (penalty scored)		(penalty scored) Tarcísio; (penalty scored) Rodrigo Mucuri; (penalty scored) Alex Moreira; (penalty scored) Morais; (penalty missed) Juan Palacios

==== Third round ====
30 April 2024	Atlético Mineiro	2–0	Sport	Belo Horizonte
21:30 (UTC-3)	Zaracho 29'; Arana 58'	Report		Stadium: Arena MRV; Attendance: 39,595; Referee: Bruno Mota Correia

22 May 2024	Sport	1–0	Atlético Mineiro	São Lourenço da Mata
20:00 (UTC-3)	Chrystian Barletta 14'	Report		Stadium: Estádio Governador Carlos Wilson Campos (Arena Pernambuco); Attendance: 20,035; Referee: Bráulio da Silva Machado

==== Record ====
Final Position	Points	Matches	Wins	Draws	Losses	Goals For	Goals Away	Avg%
17th	7	4	2	1	1	6	3	58%

=== Série B ===
==== League table ====
Pos	Team	Pld	W	D	L	GF	GA	GD	Pts	Promotion or relegation
1	Santos (C, P)	38	20	8	10	57	32	+25	68	Promotion to 2025 Campeonato Brasileiro Série A
2	Mirassol (P)	38	19	10	9	42	26	+16	67	Promotion to 2025 Campeonato Brasileiro Série A
3	Sport (P)	38	19	9	10	57	37	+20	66	Promotion to 2025 Campeonato Brasileiro Série A
4	Ceará (P)	38	19	7	12	59	41	+18	64	Promotion to 2025 Campeonato Brasileiro Série A
5	Novorizontino	38	18	10	10	43	31	+12	64	

Source: CBF
Rules for classification: 1) points; 2) wins; 3) goal difference; 4) goals scored; 5) head-to-head results (only between 2 teams); 6) fewest red cards; 7) fewest yellow cards; 8) drawing of lots.
(C) Champions; (P) Promoted

==== Results summary ====
Overall								Home						Away					
Pld	W	D	L	GF	GA	GD	Pts	W	D	L	GF	GA	GD	W	D	L	GF	GA	GD
38	19	9	10	57	37	+20	66	12	3	4	36	19	+17	7	6	6	21	18	+3

==== Matches ====
20 April 2024 1	Amazonas	2–3	Sport	Manaus
17:00 (UTC-4)	Matheus Santos 67'; Jô 90+1'	Report	Romarinho 31'; Gustavo Coutinho 49'; Luciano Castán 69'	Stadium: Arena da Amazônia; Attendance: 6,497; Referee: Wagner do Nascimento Magalhães

26 April 2024 2	Sport	2–0	Vila Nova	São Lourenço da Mata
19:00 (UTC-3)	Rafael Thyere 27'; Gustavo Coutinho 51'	Report		Stadium: Estádio Governador Carlos Wilson Campos (Arena Pernambuco); Attendance: 14,282; Referee: Kléber Ariel Goncalves da Silva

3 May 2024 3	Coritiba	0–1	Sport	Curitiba
21:30 (UTC-3)		Report	Gustavo Coutinho 21'	Stadium: Estádio Major Antônio (Couto Pereira); Attendance: 17,974; Referee: Vinicius Goncalves Dias Araujo

11 May 2024 4	Sport	4–1	Brusque	São Lourenço da Mata
17:00 (UTC-3)	Gustavo Coutinho 42' (pen.); Ortiz 61'; Chrystian Barletta 73', 86'	Report	Keké 80'	Stadium: Estádio Governador Carlos Wilson Campos (Arena Pernambuco); Attendance: 25,705; Referee: João Vitor Gobi

15 May 2024 5	Ituano	1–0	Sport	Itu
19:00 (UTC-3)	Vinícius Paiva 69'	Report		Stadium: Estádio Municipal Dr. Novelli Júnior; Attendance: 1,970; Referee: Jefferson Ferreira de Moraes

18 May 2024 6	Sport	1–2	Avaí	São Lourenço da Mata
21:00 (UTC-3)	Alan Ruiz 4'	Report	Maurício Garcez 90'; Jean Lucas 90+6'	Stadium: Estádio Governador Carlos Wilson Campos (Arena Pernambuco); Attendance: 13,447; Referee: Alex Gomes Stéfano

31 May 2024 8	Goiás	3–0	Sport	Goiânia
21:30 (UTC-3)	Welliton 5'; Marcão 69'; Luiz Henrique 90+6'	Report		Stadium: Estádio Hailé Pinheiro (Serrinha); Attendance: 6,952; Referee: Luiz Flavio de Oliveira

10 June 2024 9	Sport	1–0	Paysandu	São Lourenço da Mata
21:30 (UTC-3)	Domínguez 73'	Report		Stadium: Estádio Governador Carlos Wilson Campos (Arena Pernambuco); Attendance: 11,707; Referee: André Luiz Skettino Policarpo Bento

16 June 2024 10	Sport	1–0	Mirassol	São Lourenço da Mata
18:30 (UTC-3)	Rosales 66'	Report		Stadium: Estádio Governador Carlos Wilson Campos (Arena Pernambuco); Attendance: 14,183; Referee: Savio Pereira Sampaio

20 June 2024 11	Ceará	0–0	Sport	Fortaleza
21:30 (UTC-3)		Report		Stadium: Estádio Governador Plácido Castelo (Castelão); Attendance: 12,391; Referee: Rafael Rodrigo Klein

24 June 2024 12	Sport	1–2	Novorizontino	São Lourenço da Mata
19:00 (UTC-3)	Domínguez 77'	Report	Alisson Cassiano 1' (o.g.); Fabrício Daniel 37'	Stadium: Estádio Governador Carlos Wilson Campos (Arena Pernambuco); Attendance: 12,438; Referee: Angleison Marcos Vieira Monteiro

29 June 2024 13	Botafogo–SP	1–1	Sport	Ribeirão Preto
17:00 (UTC-3)	Carlos Manuel 6'	Report	Zé Roberto 90+4' (pen.)	Stadium: Estádio Santa Cruz (Arena Nicnet); Attendance: 4,383; Referee: Yuri Elino Ferreira da Cruz

7 July 2024 14	Guarani	0–1	Sport	Campinas
18:30 (UTC-3)		Report	Zé Roberto 76' (pen.)	Stadium: Estádio Brinco de Ouro da Princesa; Attendance: 4,286; Referee: Maguielson Lima Barbosa

13 July 2024 15	Sport	1–1	América–MG	São Lourenço da Mata
17:00 (UTC-3)	Domínguez 61'	Report	Éder 16'	Stadium: Estádio Governador Carlos Wilson Campos (Arena Pernambuco); Attendance: 16,916; Referee: João Vitor Gobi

23 July 2024 17	Chapecoense	1–1	Sport	Chapecó
19:00 (UTC-3)	Roberto Rosales 90+5' (o.g.)	Report	Domínguez 28'	Stadium: Arena Condá; Attendance: 4,565; Referee: João Vitor Gobi

27 July 2024 18	Sport	3–1	Ponte Preta	São Lourenço da Mata
18:00 (UTC-3)	Domínguez 24', 83'; Ortiz 90+8'	Report	Jeh 45+2'	Stadium: Estádio Governador Carlos Wilson Campos (Arena Pernambuco); Attendance: 14,037; Referee: Lucas Guimaraes Rechatiko Horn

2 August 2024 19	Santos	1–1	Sport	Santos
21:30 (UTC-3)	Guilherme 29'	Report	Gustavo Coutinho 82' (pen.)	Stadium: Estádio Urbano Caldeira (Vila Belmiro); Attendance: 13,629; Referee: Paulo César Zanovelli da Silva

10 August 2024 20	Sport	3–2	Amazonas	São Lourenço da Mata
17:00 (UTC-3)	Chrystian Barletta 9'; Gustavo Coutinho 15'; Zé Roberto 84'	Report	Luan Santos 40', 61'	Stadium: Estádio Governador Carlos Wilson Campos (Arena Pernambuco); Attendance: 20,283; Referee: Rodrigo da Fonseca Silva

16 August 2024 21	Vila Nova	2–0	Sport	Goiânia
21:00 (UTC-3)	Rhuan 45+1'; Emerson Urso 77'	Report		Stadium: Estádio Onésio Brasileiro Alvarenga; Attendance: 5,191; Referee: Rafael Rodrigo Klein

22 August 2024 22	Sport	0–1	Coritiba	São Lourenço da Mata
21:00 (UTC-3)		Report	Bruno Melo 61'	Stadium: Estádio Governador Carlos Wilson Campos (Arena Pernambuco); Attendance: 11,603; Referee: Felipe Fernandes de Lima

27 August 2024 23	Brusque	1–0	Sport	Florianópolis
21:00 (UTC-3)	Diego Mathias 42'	Report		Stadium: Estádio Aderbal Ramos da Silva (Ressacada); Attendance: 158; Referee: Maguielson Lima Barbosa

2 September 2024 24	Sport	3–2	Ituano	São Lourenço da Mata
19:30 (UTC-3)	Thonny Anderson 11' (o.g.); Zé Roberto 71', 86'	Report	José Aldo 1'; Álvaro 90+4'	Stadium: Estádio Governador Carlos Wilson Campos (Arena Pernambuco); Attendance: 8,870; Referee: André Luiz Skettino Policarpo Bento

7 September 2024 25	Avaí	0–2	Sport	Florianópolis
19:00 (UTC-3)		Report	Domínguez 13'; Chrystian Barletta 61'	Stadium: Estádio Aderbal Ramos da Silva (Ressacada); Attendance: 9,584; Referee: Fábio Augusto Santos Sá Junior

11 September 2024 7*	CRB	1–1	Sport	Maceió
21:30 (UTC-3)	Mike 14'	Report	Wellington Silva 67'	Stadium: Estádio Rei Pelé; Attendance: 6,564; Referee: Yuri Elino Ferreira da Cruz

15 September 2024 26	Sport	2–0	CRB	São Lourenço da Mata
18:30 (UTC-3)	Lucas Lima 35'; Zé Roberto 54'	Report	Goal	Stadium: Estádio Governador Carlos Wilson Campos (Arena Pernambuco); Attendance: 16,786; Referee: Antônio Dib Moraes de Sousa

18 September 2024 27	Sport	1–1	Goiás	São Lourenço da Mata
19:00 (UTC-3)	Zé Roberto 23' (pen.)	Report	Edu Júnior 11'	Stadium: Estádio Governador Carlos Wilson Campos (Arena Pernambuco); Attendance: 14,432; Referee: Rafael Rodrigo Klein

23 September 2024 28	Paysandu	0–1	Sport	Belém
18:30 (UTC-3)		Report	Igor Cariús 64'	Stadium: Estádio Leônidas Sodré de Castro (Curuzu); Attendance: 6,186; Referee: André Luiz Skettino Policarpo Bento

29 September 2024 29	Mirassol	0–0	Sport	Mirassol
18:30 (UTC-3)		Report		Stadium: Estádio Municipal José Maria de Campos Maia; Attendance: 7,417; Referee: Sávio Pereira Sampaio

7 October 2024 30	Sport	2–1	Ceará	Recife
21:00 (UTC-3)	Chrystian Barletta 60'; Wellington Silva 90+4'	Report	Erick Pulga 78'	Stadium: Estádio Adelmar da Costa Carvalho (Ilha do Retiro); Attendance: 26,345; Referee: Wilton Pereira Sampaio

11 October 2024 31	Novorizontino	1–3	Sport	Novo Horizonte
18:30 (UTC-3)	Marlon 59' (pen.)	Report	Chico 38'; Gustavo Coutinho 42'; Chrystian Barletta 77'	Stadium: Estádio Doutor Jorge Ismael de Biasi; Attendance: 3,106; Referee: Bruno Arleu de Araújo

16 October 2024 16*	Sport	1–2	Operário Ferroviário	Recife
21:30 (UTC-3)	Ortiz 21'	Report	Boschilia 4'; Nathan 82'	Stadium: Estádio Adelmar da Costa Carvalho (Ilha do Retiro); Attendance: 26,345; Referee: Yuri Elino Ferreira da Cruz

20 October 2024 32	Sport	3–1	Botafogo–SP	Recife
19:30 (UTC-3)	Domínguez 20'; Chrystian Barletta 30'; Fernández 75'	Report	Bernardo Schappo 62'	Stadium: Estádio Adelmar da Costa Carvalho (Ilha do Retiro); Attendance: 26,345; Referee: Emerson Ricardo de Almeira Andrade

24 October 2024 33	Sport	4–0	Guarani	Recife
21:30 (UTC-3)	Fabinho 30'; Chrystian Barletta 40'; Felipinho 45+1'; Chico 89'	Report		Stadium: Estádio Adelmar da Costa Carvalho (Ilha do Retiro); Attendance: 24,846; Referee: Alex Gomes Stefano

28 October 2024 34	América–MG	2–1	Sport	Belo Horizonte
21:00 (UTC-3)	Elizari 9'; Brenner 68' (pen.)	Report	Domínguez 79'	Stadium: Estádio Raimundo Sampaio (Independência); Attendance: 1,889; Referee: Wagner do Nascimento Magalhães

4 November 2024 35	Operário Ferroviário	2–1	Sport	Ponta Grossa
19:00 (UTC-3)	Vinícius Diniz 71'; Gabriel Boschilia 82'	Report	Ortiz 39'	Stadium: Estádio Germano Krüger; Attendance: 4,048; Referee: Emerson Ricardo de Almeida

10 November 2024 36	Sport	1–1	Chapecoense	Recife
18:30 (UTC-3)	Fernández 47'	Report	Pedro Perotti 84'	Stadium: Estádio Adelmar da Costa Carvalho (Ilha do Retiro); Attendance: 25,921; Referee: Alex Gomes Stefano

16 November 2024 37	Ponte Preta	0–4	Sport	Campinas
21:30 (UTC-3)		Report	Chrystian Barletta 7'; Domínguez 34'; Rafael Thyere 48'; Fabinho 85'	Stadium: Estádio Moisés Lucarelli; Attendance: 4,767; Referee: Rafael Rodrigo Klein

24 November 2024 38	Sport	2–1	Santos	Recife
18:30 (UTC-3)	Lucas Lima 45+5' (pen.), 63'	Report	Wendel Silva 76'	Stadium: Estádio Adelmar da Costa Carvalho (Ilha do Retiro); Attendance: 24,389; Referee: Bruno Arleu de Araujo

==== Record ====
Final Position	Points	Matches	Wins	Draws	Losses	Goals For	Goals Away	Avg%
3rd	66	38	19	9	10	57	37	58%
