= 2023 Campeonato Alagoano =

Campeonato Alagoano
- Season: 2023
- Dates: 14 January – 9 April
- Champions: CRB (33rd title)
- Relegated: Aliança
- Copa do Brasil: ASA; CRB; Murici
- Série D: ASA; CSE (via Copa Alagoas)
- Copa do Nordeste: CRB
- Copa do Nordeste qualification: ASA; CSA (via RNC)
- Matches: 36
- Goals: 89 (2.47 per match)
- Top goalscorer: Renato; Wanderson (4 goals each)
- All statistics correct as of 8 April 2023.

The 2023 Campeonato Alagoano (officially the Série A Alagoano 1XBET 2023 for sponsorship reasons) was the 93rd edition of the top football league in Alagoas organized by FAF. It began on 14 January and ended on 9 April 2023.

The finals were played between the defending champions CRB and ASA on 1 and 8 April 2023. CRB won 3–0 on aggregate securing their 33rd title.

== Format ==
In the first stage, each team played the other seven teams in a single round-robin tournament. Top four teams advanced to the semi-finals, while the bottom team was relegated to the 2024 Campeonato Alagoano Série B. Semi-finals and finals were played on a home-and-away two-legged basis with the best overall performance team hosting the second leg. If tied on aggregate, the penalty shoot-out would be used to determine the winners.

Champions qualified for the 2024 Copa do Brasil and 2024 Copa do Nordeste, while runners-up qualified for the 2024 Copa do Brasil and 2024 Copa do Nordeste qualification. 2023 Campeonato Alagoano third place and 2023 Copa Alagoas champions (CSE) played a two-legged play-off to determine the third team qualified for the 2024 Copa do Brasil. If tied on aggregate, the penalty shoot-out would be used to determine the winners. Best team not already qualified for 2024 Série A, Série B or Série C qualified for 2024 Campeonato Brasileiro Série D.

== Teams ==
Club	Home city	Manager
Aliança	Pilar	Alan Costa (caretaker)
ASA	Arapiraca	Sidney Moraes
Coruripe	Coruripe	Alyson Dantas
CRB	Maceió	Umberto Louzer
Cruzeiro de Arapiraca	Arapiraca	Adriano Rodrigues
CSA	Maceió	Vinícius Bergantin
CSE	Palmeira dos Índios	Rommel Vieira
Murici	Murici	Bruno Monteiro

== First stage ==
Pos	Team	Pld	W	D	L	GF	GA	GD	Pts	Qualification or relegation
1	CRB	7	6	1	0	16	6	+10	19	Advance to Semi-finals
2	ASA	7	3	2	2	10	7	+3	11	Advance to Semi-finals
3	Murici	7	3	2	2	9	11	−2	11	Advance to Semi-finals
4	Coruripe	7	2	3	2	7	8	−1	9	Advance to Semi-finals
5	CSA	7	2	2	3	8	7	+1	8	
6	CSE	7	1	4	2	5	8	−3	7	
7	Cruzeiro de Arapiraca	7	2	0	5	10	9	+1	6	
8	Aliança (R)	7	1	2	4	6	15	−9	5	Relegated to 2024 Campeonato Alagoano Série B

Source: FAF
Rules for classification: 1) Points; 2) Wins; 3) Goal difference; 4) Goals scored; 5) Head-to-head result (only between 2 teams); 6) Fewest red cards; 7) Fewest yellow cards; 8) Draw.
(R) Relegated

== Final stage ==
=== Bracket ===
Semi-finals
Murici	1	0	1
ASA	1	1	2
Coruripe	2	1	3
CRB	3	3	6

Finals
ASA	0	0	0
CRB	2	1	3

=== Semi-finals ===
Team 1	Agg.	Team 2	1st leg	2nd leg
Coruripe	3–6	CRB	2–3	1–3
Murici	1–2	ASA	1–1	0–1

==== Matches ====
11 March
19:00

Coruripe	2–3	CRB
Tatá Baiano 1'; Everson 79'	Report	João Paulo 8'; Anselmo Ramon 25'; Gilvan 87'

Estádio Gerson Amaral, Coruripe
Attendance: 1,328
Referee: Denis da Silva Ribeiro Serafim

19 March
16:00

CRB	3–1	Coruripe
Renato 13', 65'; Anselmo Ramon 58'	Report	Tatá Baiano 51' (pen.)

Estádio Rei Pelé, Maceió
Attendance: 9,012
Referee: José Ricardo Vasconcellos Laranjeira

CRB qualified for 2024 Copa do Brasil

12 March
16:00

Murici	1–1	ASA
Palacios 50'	Report	Fidélis 3'

Estádio José Gomes da Costa, Murici
Attendance: 1,554
Referee: José Ricardo Vasconcellos Laranjeira

18 March
19:00

ASA	1–0	Murici
Lúcio Maranhão 31'	Report

Estádio Municipal Coaracy da Mata Fonseca, Arapiraca
Attendance: 5,998
Referee: Rafael Carlos Salgueiro Lima

ASA qualified for 2024 Copa do Brasil

=== Finals ===
1 April 2023
16:00

ASA	0–2	CRB
	Report	Fábio Alemão 32'; Mike 55'

Estádio Municipal Coaracy da Mata Fonseca, Arapiraca
Attendance: 2,813
Referee: Bruno Arleu de Araújo (Rio de Janeiro)

ASA	CRB

GK	1	(Brazil) Renan Rinaldi
DF	2	(Brazil) Lázaro		(substituted off) 65'
DF	3	(Brazil) Cristian Lucca	(yellow card) 90+3'
DF	4	(Brazil) Fábio Aguiar (c)
DF	6	(Brazil) Wendel
MF	28	(Brazil) Fidélis	(yellow card) 65'
MF	8	(Brazil) Everton Heleno		(substituted off) 77'
MF	10	(Brazil) Feijão	(yellow card) 69'
MF	19	(Brazil) Didira		(substituted off) 65'
FW	9	(Brazil) Lúcio Maranhão
FW	11	(Brazil) Vitinho
Substitutes:
GK	12	(Brazil) Flávio Henrique
DF	13	(Brazil) Michel Tiago		(substituted in) 65'
DF	14	(Brazil) Iverton
DF	16	(Brazil) Alan
MF	15	(Brazil) Magdiel
MF	18	(Brazil) Esquerdinha
MF	22	(Brazil) Bruninho
FW	17	(Brazil) Matheuzinho
FW	20	(Brazil) Joãozinho		(substituted in) 77'
FW	21	(Brazil) Chuck		(substituted in) 65'
FW	25	(Brazil) Alan Francisco
FW	29	(Brazil) Tito
Coach:
(Brazil) Sidney Moraes

GK	12	(Brazil) Diogo Silva
DF	2	(Brazil) Matheus Ribeiro
DF	3	(Brazil) Gum
DF	4	(Brazil) Fábio Alemão	(yellow card) 60'
DF	6	(Brazil) Guilherme Romão	(yellow card) 34'
MF	5	(Brazil) Auremir (c)
MF	8	(Brazil) Juninho Valoura	(yellow card) 20'	(substituted off) 62'
MF	18	(Brazil) João Paulo		(substituted off) 87'
FW	11	(Brazil) Renato		(substituted off) 81'
FW	9	(Brazil) Anselmo Ramon		(substituted off) 87'
FW	20	(Brazil) Mike		(substituted off) 87'
Substitutes:
GK	1	(Brazil) Vitor Caetano
GK	23	(Brazil) João Vitor
DF	13	(Brazil) Hereda		(substituted in) 87'
DF	14	(Brazil) Matheus Mega
DF	15	(Brazil) Gilvan
MF	10	(Brazil) Rafael Longuine		(substituted in) 87'
MF	16	(Brazil) Falcão		(substituted in) 62'
MF	17	(Brazil) David Braw		(substituted in) 81'
FW	7	(Colombia) Jonathan Copete
FW	19	(Brazil) Riquelme
FW	22	(Brazil) Gabriel Conceição	(red card) 90+4'	(substituted in) 87'
Coach:
(Brazil) Umberto Louzer

Assistant referees:
Rodrigo Figueiredo Henrique Corrêa (Rio de Janeiro)
Fernanda Nândrea Gomes Antunes (Minas Gerais)
Fourth official:
Andreza Helena de Siqueira (Minas Gerais)
Video assistant referee:
Daniel Nobre Bins (Rio Grande do Sul)
Assistant video assistant referees:
Vinícius Gomes do Amaral (Minas Gerais)

8 April 2023
16:00

CRB	1–0	ASA
Copete 4'	Report

Estádio Rei Pelé, Maceió
Attendance: 14,728
Referee: Denis da Silva Ribeiro Serafim

CRB	ASA

GK	12	(Brazil) Diogo Silva
DF	2	(Brazil) Matheus Ribeiro
DF	3	(Brazil) Gum
DF	4	(Brazil) Fábio Alemão
DF	6	(Brazil) Guilherme Romão		(substituted off) 63'
MF	5	(Brazil) Auremir (c)		(substituted off) 70'
MF	8	(Brazil) Juninho Valoura		(substituted off) 63'
MF	18	(Brazil) João Paulo
FW	7	(Colombia) Jonathan Copete		(substituted off) 56'
FW	9	(Brazil) Anselmo Ramon	(yellow card) 20'
FW	20	(Brazil) Mike		(substituted off) 63'
Substitutes:
GK	1	(Brazil) Vitor Caetano
GK	23	(Brazil) João Vitor
DF	13	(Brazil) Hereda
DF	14	(Brazil) Matheus Mega
DF	15	(Brazil) Gilvan
DF	22	(Brazil) Luiz Henrique		(substituted in) 63'
MF	10	(Brazil) Rafael Longuine		(substituted in) 63'
MF	16	(Brazil) Falcão		(substituted in) 63'
MF	17	(Brazil) Anderson Leite		(substituted in) 70'
MF	24	(Brazil) David Braw		(substituted in) 56'
FW	11	(Brazil) Renato
FW	19	(Brazil) Riquelme
Coach:
(Brazil) Umberto Louzer

GK	1	(Brazil) Renan Rinaldi
DF	2	(Brazil) Michel Tiago		(substituted off) 74'
DF	3	(Brazil) Cristian Lucca
DF	4	(Brazil) Fábio Aguiar (c)
DF	6	(Brazil) Wendel		(substituted off) 35'
MF	5	(Brazil) Zé Wilson	(yellow card) 20'	(substituted off) 46'
MF	28	(Brazil) Fidélis
MF	8	(Brazil) Everton Heleno		(substituted off) 46'
MF	10	(Brazil) Feijão		(substituted off) 74'
FW	9	(Brazil) Lúcio Maranhão	(yellow card) 8'
FW	11	(Brazil) Vitinho
Substitutes:
GK	12	(Brazil) Flávio Henrique
DF	13	(Brazil) Lázaro
DF	14	(Brazil) Iverton
DF	16	(Brazil) Alan
MF	15	(Brazil) Magdiel
MF	17	(Brazil) Esquerdinha	(yellow card) 45+1'	(substituted in) 35'
MF	18	(Brazil) Bruninho
MF	19	(Brazil) Didira		(substituted in) 46'
FW	20	(Brazil) Joãozinho		(substituted in) 46'
FW	21	(Brazil) Chuck		(substituted in) 74'
FW	22	(Brazil) Alan Francisco
FW	29	(Brazil) Tito		(substituted in) 74'
Coach:
(Brazil) Sidney Moraes

Assistant referees:
Pedro Jorge Santos de Araújo
Brígida Cirilo Ferreira
Fourth official:
José Jaini Oliveira Bispo
Video assistant referee:
José Ricardo Laranjeira
Assistant video assistant referees:
Ruan Luiz de Barros

CRB qualified for 2024 Copa do Nordeste

== 2024 Copa do Brasil play-off ==
4 April 2023
20:00

Murici	2–0	CSE
Diego Palhinha 10'; Carlos Caaporã 13'	Report

Estádio José Gomes da Costa, Murici
Referee: José Ricardo Vasconcellos Laranjeira

9 April 2023
16:00

CSE	0–1	Murici
	Report	Uesles 16'

Estádio Juca Sampaio, Palmeira dos Índios
Attendance: 2,823
Referee: Márcio dos Santos Oliveira

Murici qualified for 2024 Copa do Brasil
