= 2018 Lebanese Elite Cup =

Tournament details
- Country: Lebanon
- Dates: 28 July 2018 – 27 August 2018
- Teams: 6

Final positions
- Champions: Nejmeh (11th title)
- Runners-up: Akhaa Ahli

Tournament statistics
- Matches played: 9
- Goals scored: 27 (3 per match)
- Top goal scorer: Carlos Alberto (4)

The 2018 Lebanese Elite Cup is the 21st edition of this football tournament in Lebanon. The competition started on 28 July through to the final. This tournament includes the six best teams from the 2017–18 Lebanese Premier League season.

== Group stage ==
=== Group A ===
Team	Pld	W	D	L	GF	GA	GD	Pts
(Lebanon) Akhaa Ahli	2	1	1	0	3	2	+1	4
(Lebanon) Ahed	2	1	0	1	5	3	+2	3
(Lebanon) Ansar	2	0	1	1	2	5	-3	1

28 July 2018
14:00
Group Stage

Ahed	1–2	Akhaa Ahli
Monzer 23'	Report	Carlos Alberto 40', 71'

Amin Abdelnour Stadium, Bhamdoun
1 August 2018
14:00
Group Stage

Ahed	4–1	Ansar
Coulibaly 27'; Mohamad Kdouh 38'; Chaito 70'; Mohamad Haidar 90'	Report	Hussein Dakik 45' (o.g.)

Amin Abdelnour Stadium, Bhamdoun
5 August 2018
14:00
Group Stage

Akhaa Ahli	1–1	Ansar
Carlos Alberto	Report	Hassan Hammoud

Tripoli Municipal Stadium, Tripoli

=== Group B ===
Team	Pld	W	D	L	GF	GA	GD	Pts
(Lebanon) Nejmeh	2	2	0	0	7	1	+6	6
(Lebanon) Salam Zgharta	2	0	1	1	1	4	−3	1
(Lebanon) Safa	2	0	1	1	0	3	−3	1

28 July 2018
14:00
Group Stage

Nejmeh	3–0	Safa
A. Hamam 63'; K. Darwich 85'; A. Bazzi 90'	Report	M. Jaafar (penalty missed) '67

Tripoli Municipal Stadium, Tripoli
1 August 2018
14:00
Group Stage

Nejmeh	4–1	Salam Zgharta
Hassan Maatouk 31', 86'; Ali El Hajj 48'; Hassan Al Mohamed 82'	Report	Marko Mihajlovic 13'

Tripoli Municipal Stadium, Tripoli
5 August 2018
14:00
Group Stage

Safa	0–0	Salam Zgharta
	Report

Amin Abdelnour Stadium, Bhamdoun

== Final stage ==
Semi-finals
19 August 2018, Beirut
Akhaa Ahli	3
Salam Zgharta	1
19 August 2018, Beirut
Nejmeh	3
Ahed	1

Final
25 August 2018, Beirut
Akhaa Ahli	0
Nejmeh	1

=== Semi finals ===
19 August 2018
16:00
Semifinals

Akhaa Ahli	3–1	Salam Zgharta
C. Lucca 17', 19'; C. Alberto 60'	Report	M. Nias 2'

Ahed Stadium, Beirut

19 August 2018
16:00
Semifinals

Nejmeh	3–1	Ahed
H. Maatouk 45'; N. Matar 55'; H. Mohamad 66'	Report	K. Khamis 10'

Camille Chamoun Stadium, Beirut

=== Final ===
25 August 2018
17:00
Final

Akhaa Ahli	0–1	Nejmeh
	Report	Cristian Lucca 39' (o.g.)

Camille Chamoun Stadium, Beirut

== Top scorers ==
=== Top scorers ===
Rank	Player	Club	Goals
1	(Brazil) Carlos Alberto	Akhaa Ahli	4
2	(Lebanon) Hassan Maatouk	Nejmeh	3
3	(Lebanon) Hassan Mohamad	Nejmeh	2
3	(Brazil) Cristian Lucca	Akhaa Ahli	2
