= Murici Ecological Station =

Ecological station

- Estação Ecológica de Murici
- IUCN category Ia (strict nature reserve)
- Location within Brazil
- Nearest city: Murici, Alagoas
- Coordinates: 9°12′36″S 35°52′12″W
- Area: 6,116 hectares (15,110 acres)
- Designation: Ecological station
- Created: 28 May 2001
- Administrator: Chico Mendes Institute for Biodiversity Conservation

The Murici Ecological Station (Portuguese: Estação Ecológica de Murici) is an ecological station in the state of Alagoas, Brazil. It preserves a rugged area of Atlantic Forest that is important as a home for several species of rare or endangered birds.

== Location ==
The Murici Ecological Station (ESEC) is divided between the municipalities of Flexeiras (38.01%), Messias (0.86%) and Murici (61.2%) in Alagoas. It has an area of 6,116 hectares (15,110 acres). The ESEC is in the northwestern region of Alagoas, in an area that has been degraded by sugarcane plantations and cattle ranching. The ESEC is used only by researchers and for environmental education. Most of the station is in the Borborema Plateau, but parts of the east of the ESEC are in the coastal sedimentary tablelands. Elevations range from 100 to 580 metres (330 to 1,900 ft).

== History ==
The Murici Environmental Protection Area was created by state law 5,907 of 14 March 1997 to provide a buffer zone for the ESEC. The Murici Ecological Station was created by federal decree on 28 May 2001. The consultative council was created on 21 November 2002. It is classed as IUCN protected area category Ia (strict nature reserve). The purpose is to preserve nature and undertake scientific research. The area is considered a priority for the preservation of birds. The ESEC is administered by the Chico Mendes Institute for Biodiversity Conservation (ICMBio).

As of 2006 land ownership had still not been regularized. Since some undisturbed land lay outside the ESEC, and some land within the ESEC was disturbed, adjustments to the boundaries could be warranted.

== Environment ==
The rainy season is from April to August, with the highest rainfall in May and July. Annual rainfall ranges from 800 to 1,800 millimetres (31 to 71 in). The ESEC has many springs, gullies and streams that feed the Mundaú River. The water supply for the Fleixeiras municipality comes from the ESEC. Temperatures range from 20 to 29 °C (68 to 84 °F), with an average of 25 °C (77 °F).

The dominant vegetation is dense rainforest in the Atlantic Forest biome. In the best preserved areas, mostly at the higher elevations, the forest forms a fairly uniform closed canopy up to 40 metres (130 ft) high that provides shade and retains moisture. Tree species include murici (Byrsonima sericea), Didymopanax morototoni, Parkia pendula, Tabebuia species, Pseudobombax species, Bowdichia virgilioides, Tapirira guianensis, Handroanthus impetiginosus and Protium species.

The understory contains seedlings of trees, palms such as Euterpe catinga, and many lianas and epiphytes, such as Araceae, Orchidaceae (dimerandra species, Dichaea species, Rodriguezia species, Cattleya labiata, Pleurothallis species, Epidendrum species, Oncidium species and Cattleya granulosa), Bromeliaceae (Cryptanthus species, Aechmea fulgens, Tillandsia species) and Marantaceae. Plants with medicinal uses include Ficus, Lecythis and Aspidosperma species, and Abarema cochliocarpos. This last, widely used as a medicinal plant, is threatened with extinction in the Atlantic Forest.

There is high diversity of animal species. The ESEC has 13 species of endangered birds, two of which are endemic, the Alagoas foliage-gleaner (Philydor novaesi) and the Alagoas antwren (Myrmotherula snowi). Other species are orange-bellied antwren (Terenura sicki), Alagoas tyrannulet (Phylloscartes ceciliae) and the snake Bothrops muriciensis.

== Threats ==
The unit suffers from subsistence hunting by local residents and sports hunting by people from other locations. The most hunted species are paca, agouti and armadillo. Hunters have built wooden hides in the trees throughout the ESEC. Capture of birds for pets is also a constant problem. There is a risk of removal of trees for their lumber or to make charcoal, facilitated by the nearby BR-101 highway. The areas of permanent preservation are not respected by the local population, but are cleared for subsistence farming, sugarcane and pasture. Part of the problem is the lack of compensation to former owners for the land incorporated in the ESEC.

== See also ==
- Alagoas black-throated trogon

== Sources ==
- Esec de Murici (in Portuguese), ICMBio: Chico Mendes Institute for Biodiversity Conservation, archived from the original on 2016-11-07
- ESEC de Murici (ESEC) (in Portuguese), ISA: Instituto Socioambiental
- Fernandes, Jailton José Ferreira; Seixas, José Antônio Barros; Cunha, Ana Maria Canut (November 2006), Plano operativo de prevenção e combate aos incêndios florestais da Estação Ecológica de Murici (in Portuguese), Murici: IBAMA
- Unidade de Conservação: Estação Ecológica de Murici (in Portuguese), MMA: Ministério do Meio Ambiente, archived from the original on June 2, 2022
