= Pedro Lima (footballer, born 2006) =

Brazilian footballer

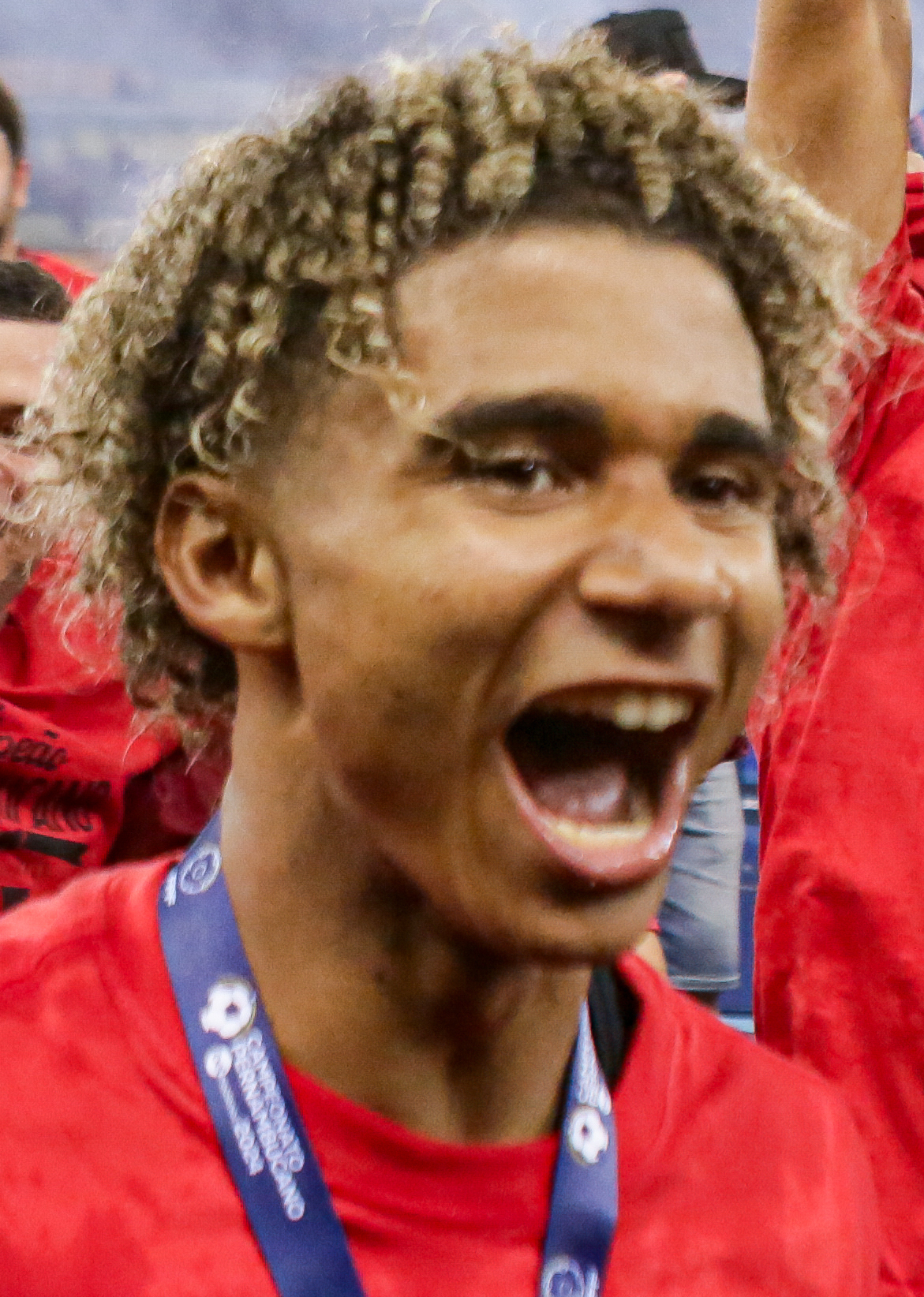
- Lima in 2024

Personal information
- Full name: Pedro Henrique Cardoso de Lima
- Date of birth: 1 July 2006 (age 20)
- Place of birth: Cabedelo, Brazil
- Height: 1.78 m (5 ft 10 in)
- Position: Right-back

Team information
- Current team: São Paulo (on loan from Wolverhampton Wanderers)

Youth career
- 2015–2021: Meninos da Paraíba
- 2021–2024: Sport Recife

Senior career*
Years	Team	Apps	(Gls)
2024	Sport Recife	13	(1)
2024–	Wolverhampton Wanderers	10	(0)
2025–2026	→ Porto B (loan)	9	(0)
2026–	→ São Paulo (loan)	0	(0)

International career^{‡}
2023	Brazil U17	5	(0)
2024–	Brazil U20	1	(0)
- * Club domestic league appearances and goals as of 19:30, 9 May 2026 (UTC) ‡ National team caps and goals as of 20:52, 1 December 2025 (UTC)

Pedro Henrique Cardoso de Lima (born 1 July 2006), known as Pedro Lima, is a Brazilian professional footballer who plays as a right-back for Campeonato Brasileiro Série A club São Paulo, on loan from EFL Championship club Wolverhampton Wanderers.

== Club career ==
=== Sport Recife ===
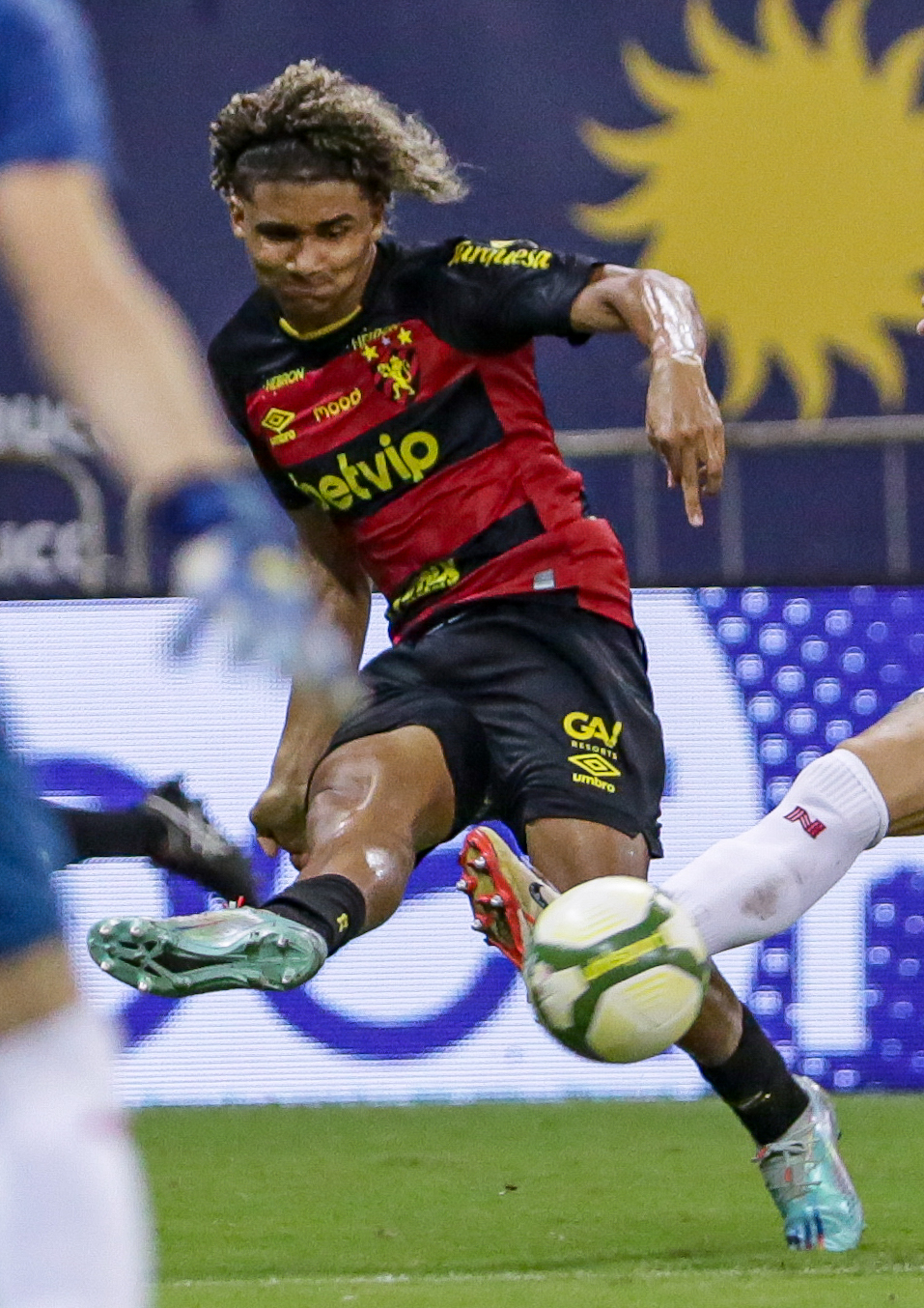
Lima in action for Sport Recife in 2024

Born in Cabedelo, Paraíba, Lima began his career with a local side called Meninos da Paraíba, before joining Sport Recife's youth sides at the age of 15. On 12 September 2023, he renewed his contract with the club until 2026.

Promoted to the first team for the 2024 season, Lima made his senior debut on 29 January of that year, starting in a 2–0 Campeonato Pernambucano home win over Afogados. He scored his first professional goal three days later, netting his team's third in a 3–0 away win over Flamengo de Arcoverde.

On 25 February 2024, after establishing himself as a first choice, Lima further extended his link with the Leão until 2027.

=== Wolverhampton Wanderers ===
On 17 June 2024, Sport Recife announced that the club had reached an agreement with English side Wolverhampton Wanderers for the signing of Lima on a permanent transfer, subject to medical tests and international clearance. On 2 July, Wolves announced the official signing of Lima on a five-year deal, with an option for another season. On 15 July 2024, Lima made his debut for Wolverhampton. He started in Wolverhampton's first pre-season friendly against Como in Marbella, Spain.

==== Porto B (loan) ====
On 1 September 2025, Lima was sent on a season-long loan to Portuguese club Porto, where he was assigned to the B-team, competing in Liga Portugal 2. However, four months later, after making nine appearances for Porto B, Lima was recalled by Wolves, returning to England.

== International career ==
On 11 October 2023, Lima was called up to the Brazil national under-17 team for the year's FIFA U-17 World Cup. He featured in all five matches of the nation during the competition, as they were knocked out by Argentina.

== Career statistics ==
As of match played 9 May 2026

Appearances and goals by club, season and competition
Club	Season	League			State League (Note: Includes Campeonato Pernambucano)		National cup (Note: Includes Copa do Brasil, FA Cup)		League cup (Note: Includes EFL Cup)		Continental		Other		Total	
Club	Season	Division	Apps	Goals	Apps	Goals	Apps	Goals	Apps	Goals	Apps	Goals	Apps	Goals	Apps	Goals
Sport Recife	2024	Série B	8	0	5	1	4	0	—		—		9 (Note: Appearances in Copa do Nordeste)	1	26	2
Wolverhampton Wanderers	2024–25	Premier League	3	0	—		1	0	2	0	—		—		6	0
Wolverhampton Wanderers	2025–26	Premier League	7	0	—		1	0	—		—		—		8	0
Wolverhampton Wanderers	Total		10	0	—		2	0	2	0	—		—		14	0
Porto B (loan)	2025–26	Liga Portugal 2	9	0	—		—		—		—		—		9	0
Career total			27	0	5	1	6	0	2	0	0	0	9	1	49	2

== Honours ==
Sport Recife

- Campeonato Pernambucano: 2024
