= Messias, Alagoas =

Municipality of Alagoas, Brazil

Messias
- Municipality of Alagoas, Brazil
- Etymology: Means in Brazilian Portuguese "Messiah", in tribute to Saint Joseph
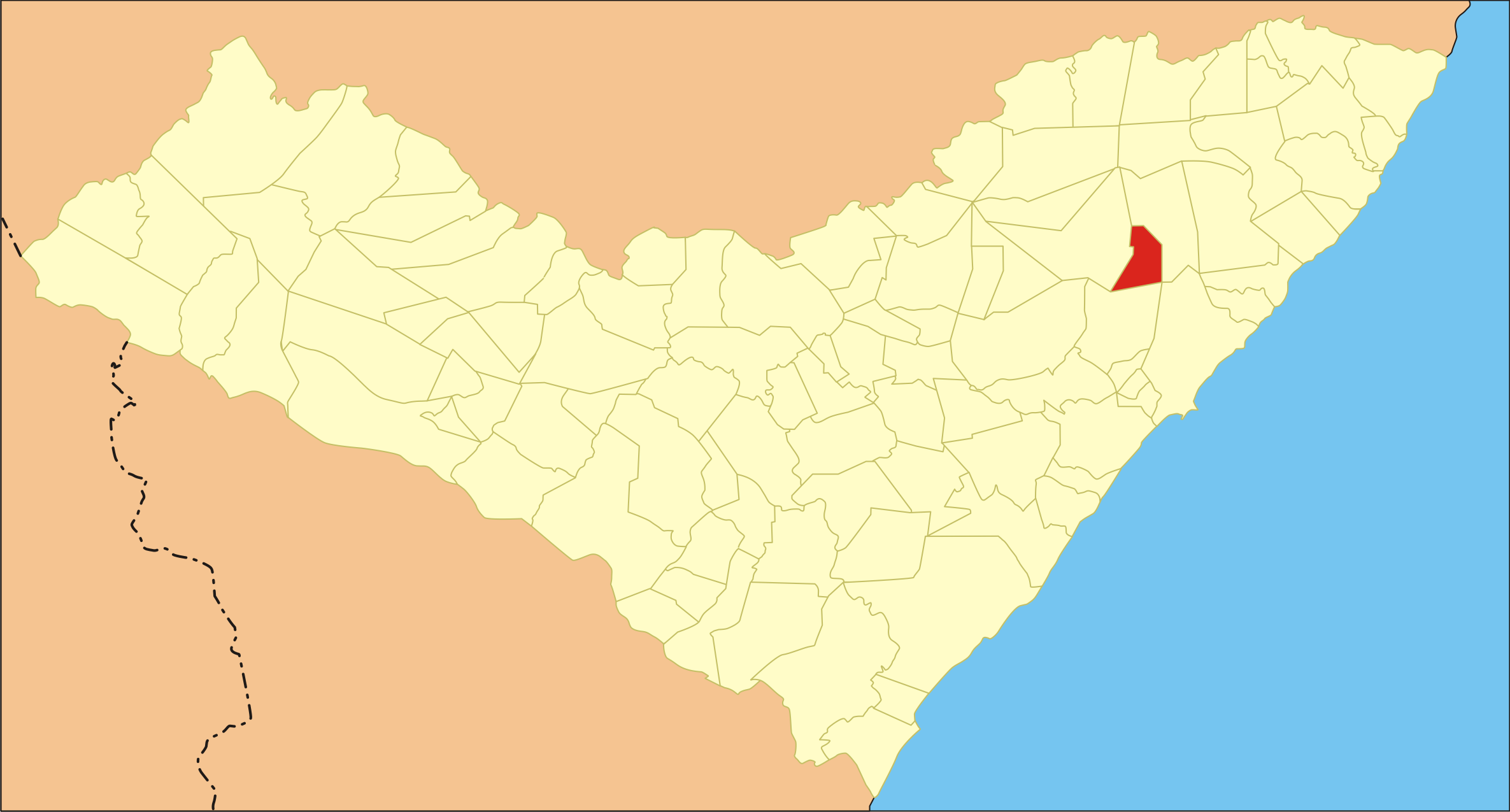
- Location of Messias in Alagoas

- Location within Brazil Location within South America
- Coordinates: 9°23′30″S 35°50′31″W
- Country: Brazil
- Region: Northeast
- State: Alagoas
- Founded: 6 September 1962

Government
  - Mayor: Marcos José Herculano da Silva (Republicanos) (2025-2028)
  - Vice Mayor: Marcos Valério dos Santos (MDB) (2025-2028)

Area
  - Total: 114.156 km^{2} (44.076 sq mi)
- Elevation: 148 m (486 ft)

Population (2022)
  - Total: 15,405
  - Density: 134.95/km^{2} (349.5/sq mi)
- Demonym: Messiense (Brazilian Portuguese)
- Time zone: UTC-03:00 (Brasília Time)
- Postal code: 57990-000
- HDI (2010): 0.568 – medium
- Website: messias.al.gov.br

Messias (Central northeastern portuguese pronunciation: [miˈsiɐ(s)]) is a municipality located in the Brazilian state of Alagoas. Its population is 18,031 (2020) and its area is 113 km^{2} (44 sq mi).

The municipality contains 1% of the 6,116 hectares (15,110 acres) Murici Ecological Station, created in 2001.

The city was founded on September 6, 1962.
