= Flexeiras =

Municipality in Alagoas, Brazil

- Municipality of Alagoas, Brazil
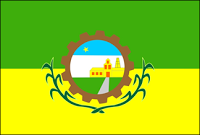
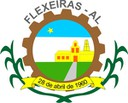
- Flag Coat of arms

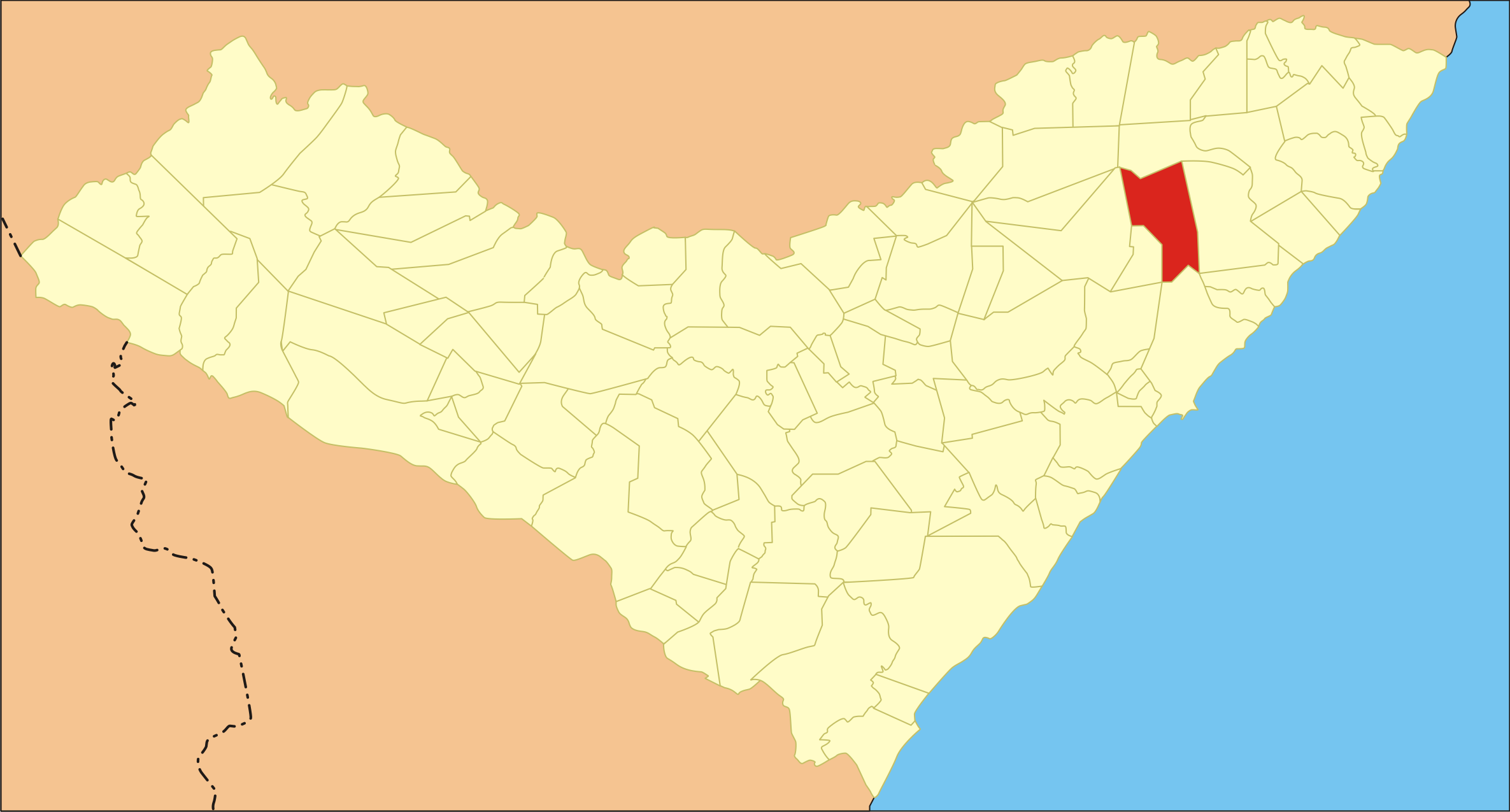
- Location of Flexeiras in Alagoas

- Location within Brazil Location within South America
- Coordinates: 9°16′35″S 35°43′25″W
- Country: Brazil
- Region: Northeast
- State: Alagoas
- Founded: 28 April 1960

Government
  - Mayor: Silvana Maria Cavalcante da Costa Pinto (PP) (2025-2028)
  - Vice Mayor: Sheila Calheiros Magalhaes Sampaio (PODE) (2025-2028)

Area
  - Total: 333.756 km^{2} (128.864 sq mi)
- Elevation: 73 m (240 ft)

Population (2022)
  - Total: 9,618
  - Density: 28.82/km^{2} (74.6/sq mi)
- Demonym: Flexeirense (Brazilian Portuguese)
- Time zone: UTC-03:00 (Brasília Time)
- Postal code: 57995-000
- HDI (2010): 0.527 – low

Flexeiras (Central northeastern portuguese pronunciation: [fleˈʃeɾɐ]) is a municipality located in the Brazilian state of Alagoas. Its population is 12,807 (2020) and its area is 316 km².

The municipality contains 38% of the 6,116 hectares (15,110 acres) Murici Ecological Station, created in 2001.

== See also ==
- List of municipalities in Alagoas
