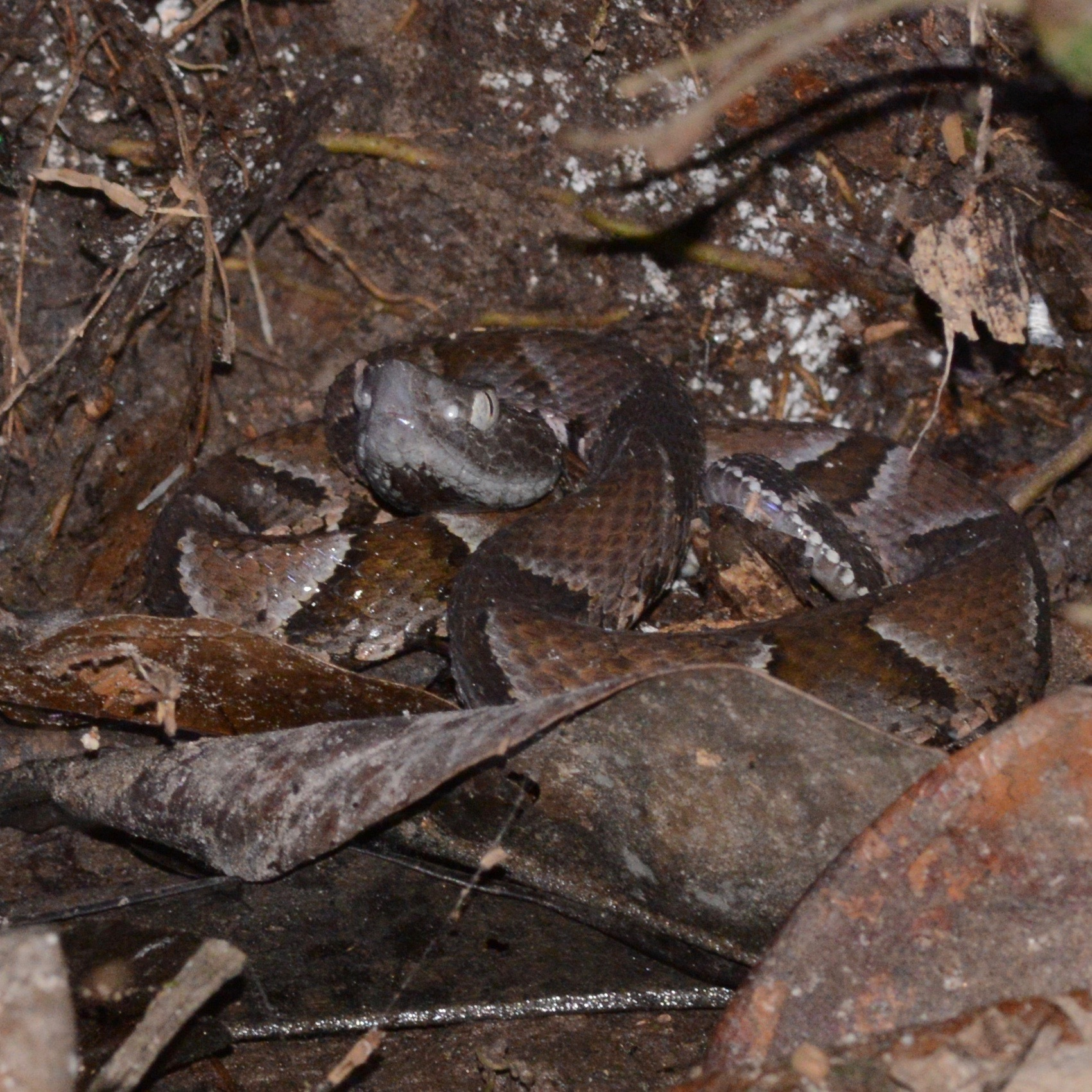

Conservation status
- Critically Endangered (IUCN 3.1)

Scientific classification
- Kingdom: Animalia
- Phylum: Chordata
- Class: Reptilia
- Order: Squamata
- Suborder: Serpentes
- Family: Viperidae
- Genus: Bothrops
- Species: B. muriciensis

Binomial name
- Bothrops muriciensis Ferrarezzi, Freire, 2001

= Bothrops muriciensis =

Endangered species of pit viper

Bothrops muriciensis, also known as Jararaca, Jararaca-de-Alagoas, Jararacuçu in Portuguese, is an endangered species of pit viper which is named after the forest it is known to inhabit, Mata de Murici, in Alagoas in the north east of Brazil. As with all vipers, B. muriciensis is venomous.

== Description ==
Bothrops muriciensis is distinguishable by its 13-14 dark triangular or trapezoidal markings, and lack of markings between them, as well as the mouth and throat colouring being dark black in males and white in females. These snakes have been discovered up to 77 cm (30 in) (snout-vent length).

== Endangered status ==
Bothrops muriciensis is considered one of the top 30 most endangered viper species, and are listed on the Brazilian Red List as endangered, as well as globally on the IUCN Red List. Knowledge of the species is lacking and up until 2012 only 9 individuals were known, all close to the first area the species was found in.

== Reproduction ==
Bothrops muriciensis reproduces sexually, with ovoviviparous birth.
