= Iago Mendonça =

Brazilian footballer (born 1999)

Personal information
- Full name: Iago Pereira Mendonça
- Date of birth: 16 August 1999 (age 27)
- Place of birth: Barreiras, Brazil
- Height: 1.95 m (6 ft 5 in)
- Position: Centre-back

Team information
- Current team: Borneo Samarinda
- Number: 35

Youth career
- 2013: Atlético Goianiense
- 2014: Jardim América
- 2016–2017: Trindade
- 2017–2019: Goiás

Senior career*
Years	Team	Apps	(Gls)
2017	Trindade	6	(0)
2019–2022	Goiás	41	(0)
2020	→ Aparecidense (loan)	0	(0)
2022	CRB	13	(0)
2023	Blooming	1	(0)
2023–2024	Vila Nova	0	(0)
2024	→ Patrocinense (loan)	5	(0)
2024–2025	Alverca	9	(0)
2025–2026	Floriana	32	(3)
2026–	Borneo Samarinda	6	(0)
- * Club domestic league appearances and goals as of 27 October 2026

Iago Pereira Mendonça (born 16 August 1999) is a Brazilian professional footballer who plays as a centre-back for Super League club Borneo Samarinda.

== Club career ==
Born in Barreiras, Bahia, Iago Mendonça represented Atlético Goianiense, Jardim América and Trindade as a youth. He made his senior debut with the latter on 11 June 2017, playing the last six minutes of a 1–0 Campeonato Goiano Segunda Divisão away win against ASEEV.

Iago Mendonça moved to Goiás in late 2017, returning to the under-20s. He made his first team debut for the Esmeraldino on 20 March 2019, starting in a 2–1 home win against Iporá for the Goiano championship. His first goal came on 11 September, netting the opener in a 4–2 home success over Luverdense, for the year's Copa Verde.

On 22 August 2020, after being rarely used, Iago Mendonça was loaned to Série D side Aparecidense for the remainder of the season. He returned in October after failing to make an appearance, but still made his Série A debut on 3 December by starting in a 0–3 home loss against São Paulo.

== Career statistics ==
As of 24 January 2021

Club	Season	League			State League		Cup		Continental		Other		Total	
Club	Season	Division	Apps	Goals	Apps	Goals	Apps	Goals	Apps	Goals	Apps	Goals	Apps	Goals
Trindade	2017	Goiano 2ª Divisão	—		6	0	—		—		—		6	0
Goiás	2019	Série A	0	0	1	0	0	0	—		4 (Note: Appearance(s) in Copa Verde)	1	5	1
Goiás	2020	Série A	5	0	1	0	0	0	0	0	—		6	0
Goiás	Total		5	0	2	0	0	0	0	0	4	1	11	1
Aparecidense (loan)	2020	Série D	0	0	—		—		—		—		0	0
Career total			14	0	3	0	0	0	0	0	2	0	19	0

== Honours ==
=== Club ===
Floriana

- Maltese Premier League: 2025–26
