= Gustavo Coutinho =

Brazilian footballer (born 1999)

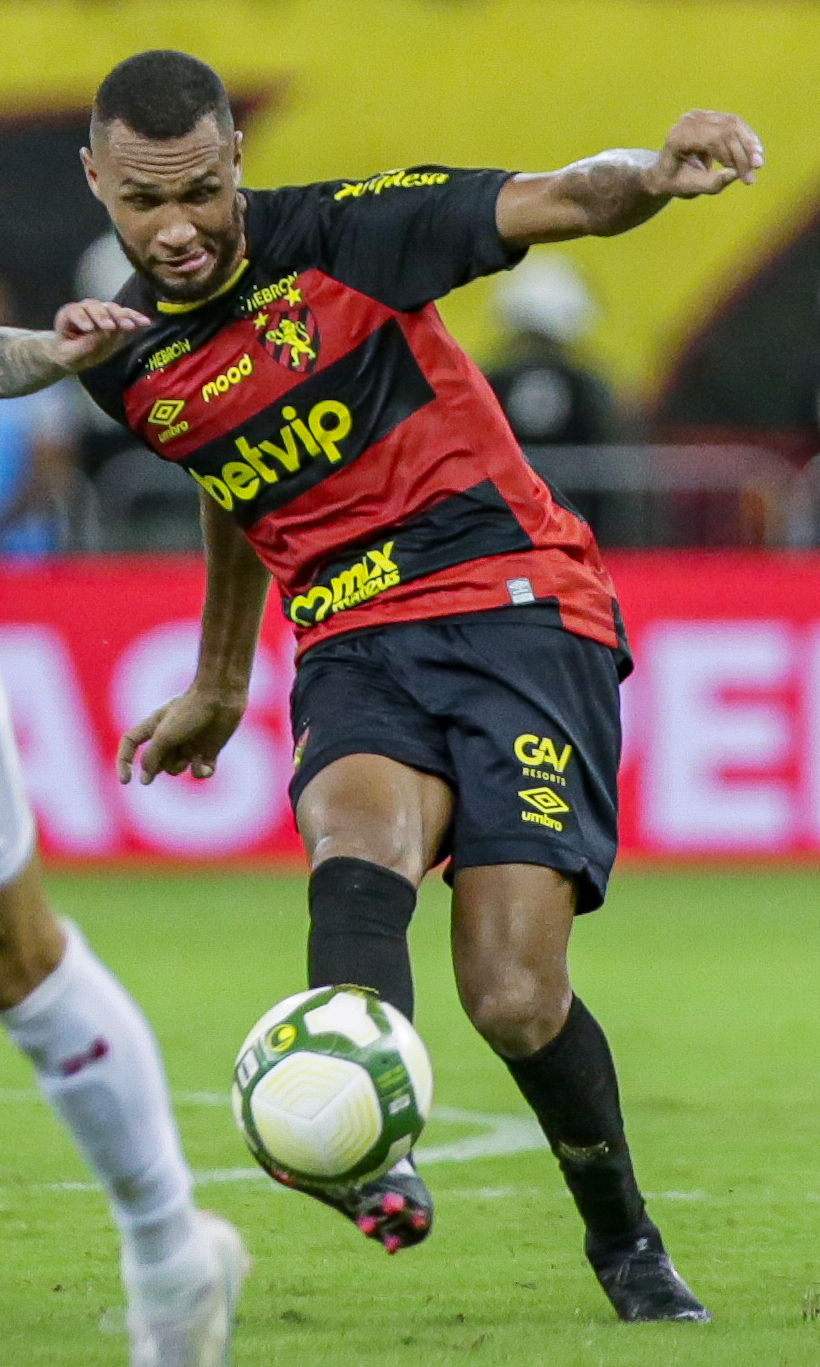
- Gustavo Coutinho playing for Sport Recife in 2024

Personal information
- Full name: Gustavo Coutinho Silva Lopes
- Date of birth: 19 January 1999 (age 27)
- Place of birth: Rio de Janeiro, Brazil
- Height: 1.82 m (6 ft 0 in)
- Position: Forward

Team information
- Current team: Atlético Goianiense
- Number: 9

Youth career
- Audax Rio
- 2014–2016: Botafogo
- 2016–2018: Alcanenense
- 2018–2019: Fortaleza

Senior career*
Years	Team	Apps	(Gls)
2017–2018	Alcanenense	15	(1)
2018–2024	Fortaleza	19	(6)
2020–2021	→ Cabofriense (loan)	22	(13)
2021	→ Operário Ferroviário (loan)	9	(0)
2022	→ Botafogo-PB (loan)	32	(9)
2022	→ Sport Recife (loan)	16	(2)
2023	→ Atlético Goianiense (loan)	27	(13)
2024–	Sport Recife	48	(12)
2025	→ Coritiba (loan)	39	(6)
2026–	→ Atlético Goianiense (loan)	35	(25)
- * Club domestic league appearances and goals as of 15 December 2025

Gustavo Coutinho Silva Lopes (born 19 January 1999) is a Brazilian footballer who plays as a forward for Atlético Goianiense, on loan from Sport Recife.

== Club career ==
Born in Rio de Janeiro, Gustavo Coutinho started his career at Audax Rio, and represented Botafogo before moving to Portugal at the age of 17, with Atlético Clube Alcanenense. He made his senior debut with the latter's first team on 26 March 2017, starting in a 0–1 Campeonato de Portugal away loss against Caldas SC.

In 2018, Coutinho returned to his home country after agreeing to a contract with Fortaleza. Initially assigned to the under-20s, he started to feature with the main squad in the following year, but failed to establish himself as a regular for the side.

In September 2020, Gustavo Coutinho was loaned to Série D side Cabofriense until the end of the year, and debuted at the club with a hat-trick in a 3–3 draw against FC Cascavel. On 10 December, he renewed his contract with Fortaleza until 2022, and extended his loan to Cabofriense the following 9 January.

On 23 February 2021, after four goals in nine matches in the 2021 Campeonato Carioca, Coutinho was recalled by his parent club.

== Career statistics ==
As of 28 May 2024

Club	Season	League			State League		Cup		Conmebol		Other		Total	
Club	Season	Division	Apps	Goals	Apps	Goals	Apps	Goals	Apps	Goals	Apps	Goals	Apps	Goals
Alcanenense	2016–17	Campeonato de Portugal	1	0	—		0	0	—		—		1	0
Alcanenense	2017–18	Campeonato de Portugal	14	1	—		0	0	—		—		14	1
Alcanenense	Subtotal		15	1	—		0	0	—		—		15	1
Fortaleza	2018	Série B	0	0	0	0	0	0	—		1 (Note: Appearance(s) in Copa Fares Lopes)	0	1	0
Fortaleza	2019	Série A	0	0	2	0	0	0	—		8 (Note: One appearance in Copa do Nordeste, seven appearances and five goals in Copa Fares Lopes)	5	10	5
Fortaleza	2020	Série A	0	0	0	0	0	0	0	0	0	0	0	0
Fortaleza	2021	Série A	0	0	3	0	1	0	—		4 (Note: Appearance(s) in Copa do Nordeste)	1	8	1
Fortaleza	Subtotal		0	0	5	0	1	0	0	0	13	6	19	6
Cabofriense (loan)	2020	Série D	13	9	—		—		—		—		13	9
Cabofriense (loan)	2021	Carioca	—		9	4	—		—		—		9	4
Cabofriense (loan)	Subtotal		13	9	9	4	—		—		—		22	13
Operário Ferroviário (loan)	2021	Série B	9	0	—		—		—		—		9	0
Botafogo (PB) (loan)	2022	Série C	13	7	12	7	—		—		7	4	32	18
Sport Recife (loan)	2022	Série B	16	2	—		—		—		—		16	2
Atlético Goianiense (loan)	2023	Série B	31	14	6	2	—		—		—		37	16
Sport Recife	2024	Série B	6	4	11	4	4	1	—		10	5	31	14
Career total			103	37	43	16	5	1	0	0	30	15	201	69

== Honours ==
Fortaleza

- Campeonato Cearense: 2019, 2021
- Copa do Nordeste: 2019

Atlético Goianiense

- Campeonato Goiano: 2023

Sport Recife

- Campeonato Pernambucano: 2024
