= Danilo Fidélis =

Brazilian footballer

Personal information
- Full name: Danilo Fidélis dos Santos
- Date of birth: 26 October 1988 (age 38)
- Place of birth: São José dos Campos, Brazil
- Height: 1.78 m (5 ft 10 in)
- Positions: Right-back; defensive midfielder

Team information
- Current team: Guarani-MG

Youth career
- 2006–2008: São José-SP

Senior career*
Years	Team	Apps	(Gls)
2008–2009	São José-SP	0	(0)
2008	→ Colatinense (loan)	5	(0)
2009	Primeira Camisa	13	(1)
2010	Joseense	3	(0)
2010	Sertãozinho	0	(0)
2011	Joseense	1	(0)
2011	Ypiranga-AP	9	(0)
2012	Independente-PA	12	(0)
2012	Ypiranga-AP	11	(0)
2012	Parauapebas	5	(2)
2013	Baraúnas	36	(4)
2013	Gavião Kyikatejê	5	(0)
2014	Potiguar Mossoró	6	(0)
2015	Rio Preto	18	(4)
2016	Caxias	24	(1)
2017	São Paulo-RS	10	(4)
2017	São José-RS	11	(1)
2018	Avenida	14	(0)
2018	Novo Hamburgo	8	(1)
2018–2021	Ypiranga-RS	68	(1)
2022–2023	ASA	29	(2)
2024	Luverdense	14	(0)
2024	Mixto	15	(1)
2025–2026	São José-SP	15	(0)
2026–	Guarani-MG	0	(0)
- * Club domestic league appearances and goals as of 19:33, 22 April 2026 (UTC)

Danilo Fidélis dos Santos (born 26 October 1988), known as Danilo Fidélis or just Fidélis, is a Brazilian footballer who plays as either a right-back or a defensive midfielder for Guarani-MG.

== Career ==
Born in São José dos Campos, São Paulo, Fidélis began his career with hometown side São José-SP, but made his senior debut while on loan at Colatinense in 2008. In 2009, he played in the Campeonato Paulista Segunda Divisão for Primeira Camisa, before returning to his hometown with Joseense in the following year.

In 2011, after short periods at Sertãozinho and back at Joseense, Fidélis joined Ypiranga-AP. He then played in the 2012 Campeonato Paraense for Independente-PA, before subsequently returning to Ypiranga.

In November 2012, Fidélis played in the first stage of the 2013 Campeonato Paraense with Parauapebas, before signing for Série C side Baraúnas on 19 December of that year. He later represented Gavião Kyikatejê before agreeing to a deal with Potiguar Mossoró for the 2014 season.

Fidélis returned to his home state for the 2015 campaign, being a regular starter for Rio Preto. On 19 November of that year, he signed a one-year contract with Caxias.

Fidélis started the 2017 season at São Paulo-RS, and later joined São José-RS. He remained in the state of Rio Grande do Sul in the following year, playing for Avenida and Novo Hamburgo before being announced at Ypiranga-RS on 15 June 2018.

Fidélis became a captain at Ypiranga, only leaving the club at the end of the 2021 season. On 8 December of that year, ASA announced his signing for the ensuing campaign.

On 20 October 2023, Fidélis signed for Luverdense, playing in the 2024 Campeonato Mato-Grossense for the side before joining Mixto on 10 April of that year. He was announced at River on 13 November 2024, but the deal later collapsed as he opted to return to his first club São José on 16 January 2025.

On 16 October 2025, 37-year-old Fidélis renewed his contract with the Águia do Vale for the following year's Campeonato Paulista Série A2.

== Personal life ==
Fídelis comes from a family of footballers: his cousin Heider Fidélis and his uncle, also known as Fidélis, were also footballers. Both played as a defender.

== Career statistics ==
As of 22 April 2026

Club	Season	League			State League		Cup		Continental		Other		Total	
Club	Season	Division	Apps	Goals	Apps	Goals	Apps	Goals	Apps	Goals	Apps	Goals	Apps	Goals
Colatinense	2008	Capixaba	—		5	0	—		—		3 (Note: Appearance(s) in Copa Espírito Santo)	0	8	0
Primeira Camisa	2009	Paulista 2ª Divisão	—		13	1	—		—		—		13	1
Joseense	2010	Paulista 2ª Divisão	—		3	0	—		—		—		3	0
Sertãozinho	2010	Paulista	—		—		—		—		5 (Note: Appearance(s) in Copa Paulista)	0	5	0
Joseense	2011	Paulista 2ª Divisão	—		1	0	—		—		—		1	0
Ypiranga-AP	2011	Amapaense	—		9	0	—		—		—		9	0
Independente-PA	2012	Paraense	—		10	0	2	0	—		—		12	0
Ypiranga-AP	2012	Amapaense	—		11	0	—		—		—		11	0
Parauapebas	2013	Paraense	—		5	2	—		—		—		5	2
Baraúnas	2013	Série C	16	0	20	4	—		—		—		36	4
Gavião Kyikatejê	2014	Paraense	—		5	0	—		—		—		5	0
Potiguar Mossoró	2014	Potiguar	—		6	0	1	0	—		5 (Note: Appearance(s) in Copa do Nordeste)	0	12	0
Rio Preto	2015	Paulista A3	—		18	4	—		—		8	1	26	5
Caxias	2016	Série D	5	0	19	1	—		—		—		24	1
São Paulo-RS	2017	Série D	—		10	4	—		—		—		10	4
São José-RS	2017	Série D	11	1	—		—		—		—		11	1
Avenida	2018	Gaúcho	—		14	0	—		—		—		14	0
Novo Hamburgo	2018	Série D	8	1	—		—		—		—		8	1
Ypiranga-RS	2018	Série C	6	0	—		—		—		18 (Note: Appearance(s) in Copa FGF)	4	24	4
Ypiranga-RS	2019	Série C	16	0	15	1	2	0	—		—		33	1
Ypiranga-RS	2020	Série C	10	0	3	0	—		—		—		13	0
Ypiranga-RS	2021	Série C	13	0	5	0	1	0	—		—		19	0
Ypiranga-RS	Total		45	0	23	1	3	0	—		18	4	89	5
ASA	2022	Série D	2	0	11	0	1	0	—		9 (Note: Appearance(s) in Copa Alagoas)	0	23	0
ASA	2023	Série D	5	0	11	2	1	0	—		6	0	23	2
ASA	Total		7	0	22	2	2	0	—		15	0	46	2
Luverdense	2024	Mato-Grossense	—		14	0	—		—		—		14	0
Mixto	2024	Série D	15	1	—		—		—		8 (Note: Appearance(s) in Copa FMF)	0	23	1
São José-SP	2025	Paulista A2	—		7	0	—		—		12	2	19	2
São José-SP	2026	Paulista A2	—		8	0	—		—		—		8	0
São José-SP	Total		—		15	0	—		—		12	2	27	2
Guarani-MG	2026	Mineiro Módulo II	—		0	0	—		—		—		0	0
Career total			107	3	223	19	8	0	0	0	74	7	412	29

== Honours ==
Ypiranga-RS

- Campeonato Gaúcho Série A2: 2019
