= João dos Santos (footballer) =

Brazilian footballer (born 1993)

Personal information
- Full name: João Victor Amaral dos Santos Silva
- Date of birth: 8 May 1993 (age 33)
- Place of birth: São Paulo, Brazil
- Height: 1.65 m (5 ft 5 in)
- Position: Midfielder

Senior career*
| Years | Team | Apps | (Gls) |
| 2011 | Paulínia FC | 7 | (1) |
| 2014 | Capivariano | 12 | (0) |
| 2014 | Guarani FC | 6 | (0) |
| 2015 | C.A. Votuporanguense | 21 | (1) |
| 2016 | C.A. Penapolense | 10 | (2) |
| 2017 | Capivariano | 9 | (0) |
| 2018–2020 | U. de G. | 59 | (16) |
| 2021 | Tlaxcala | 7 | (2) |
- * Club domestic league appearances and goals as of August 14, 2018

Joao Victor Amaral dos Santos Silva (born 8 May 1993) is a Brazilian footballer who plays as an attacking midfielder for U. de G.
