= Xande (footballer) =

Brazilian footballer

Personal information
- Full name: Alexandre Nascimento da Silva
- Date of birth: 24 April 2001 (age 25)
- Place of birth: São Miguel dos Campos, Brazil
- Height: 1.70 m (5 ft 7 in)
- Position: Winger

Team information
- Current team: Spartak Varna
- Number: 21

Youth career
- ASA

Senior career*
Years	Team	Apps	(Gls)
2020–2022	ASA	47	(5)
2022	→ Moto Club (loan)	0	(0)
2023	Treze	12	(0)
2023–2024	Portuguesa	0	(0)
2024	→ Treze (loan)	8	(1)
2024–2025	Itabuna	7	(0)
2025–	Spartak Varna	51	(7)
- * Club domestic league appearances and goals as of 12:47, 1 June 2026 (UTC)

Alexandre Nascimento da Silva (born 24 April 2001), commonly known as Xande, is a Brazilian professional footballer who plays as a winger for Bulgarian First League club Spartak Varna.

== Club career ==
Xande was born in São Miguel dos Campos, Alagoas, and finished his formation with local side ASA. After making his first team debut in the 2020 Campeonato Alagoano, he started to feature more regularly in the following years, and was chosen as the breakthrough player of the 2022 edition of the tournament.

On 16 September 2022, Xande was loaned to Moto Club for the year's Copa Federação Maranhense de Futebol. On 4 January 2023, he was announced at Treze.

On 3 May 2023, Xande signed a contract with Portuguesa until April 2025. After nine goalless matches, he returned to Treze on loan on 4 December.

== Career statistics ==
As of 25 April 2024

Club	Season	League			State League		Cup		Continental		Other		Total	
Club	Season	Division	Apps	Goals	Apps	Goals	Apps	Goals	Apps	Goals	Apps	Goals	Apps	Goals
ASA	2020	Alagoano	—		3	0	—		—		—		3	0
ASA	2021	Série D	9	0	4	0	—		—		5 (Note: Four appearances in Copa Alagoas, one appearance in Copa do Nordeste)	0	18	0
ASA	2022	Série D	20	2	11	3	1	0	—		9 (Note: Appearance(s) in Copa Alagoas)	1	41	6
ASA	Total		29	2	18	3	1	0	—		14	1	62	6
Moto Club (loan)	2022	Série D	0	0	—		—		—		4 (Note: Appearance(s) in Copa Federação Maranhense de Futebol)	0	4	0
Treze	2023	Paraibano	—		12	0	—		—		—		12	0
Portuguesa	2023	Paulista	—		0	0	—		—		9 (Note: Appearance(s) in Copa Paulista)	0	9	0
Treze (loan)	2024	Série D	0	0	8	1	1	0	—		7 (Note: Appearance(s) in Copa do Nordeste)	1	16	2
Itabuna	2024	Série D	0	0	—		—		—		—		0	0
Career total			29	2	38	4	2	0	0	0	34	2	103	8

== Honours ==
=== Individual ===
- Campeonato Alagoano Breakthrough player: 2022
