= Falcão (footballer, born 1998) =

Brazilian footballer (born 1998)

Personal information
- Full name: Lucas de Oliveira Teodoro Falcão
- Date of birth: 14 April 1998 (age 28)
- Place of birth: Feira de Santana, Brazil
- Height: 1.83 m (6 ft 0 in)
- Position: Midfielder

Team information
- Current team: Hapoel Tel Aviv
- Number: 98

Youth career
- 2015: Taboão da Serra
- 2018: Mauaense
- 2017–2018: Paulista
- 2018: Avaí

Senior career*
Years	Team	Apps	(Gls)
2019–2022	Avaí	3	(0)
2020–2021	→ Tombense (loan)	50	(0)
2022	→ Ypiranga-RS (loan)	15	(2)
2022	→ Bahia (loan)	7	(0)
2022	Bahia	0	(0)
2023–2025	CRB	85	(1)
2025	Athletico Paranaense	19	(0)
2025-	Hapoel Tel Aviv	34	(0)
- * Club domestic league appearances and goals as of 23 June 2026

Lucas de Oliveira Teodoro Falcão (born 14 April 1998), commonly known as Falcão, is a Brazilian professional footballer who plays as a midfielder for Hapoel Tel Aviv.

== Career ==
Falcão was born in Feira de Santana, Bahia, but played for clubs in the São Paulo state as a youth before joining the under-23 side of Avaí in 2018. Promoted to the first team for the 2019 season, he made his senior debut on 31 January of that year, starting in a 1–0 Campeonato Catarinense away loss to Marcílio Dias.

In January 2020, after being rarely used, Falcão moved to Tombense on loan. He helped the side in their promotion from the 2021 Série C, before joining Ypiranga-RS also in a temporary deal on 14 December 2021.

On 14 April 2022, Bahia announced the signing of Falcão on loan until the end of the year. Rarely used as the club achieved promotion to the Série A, he left the club on 4 January 2023.

Just hours after leaving Bahia, Falcão was announced at CRB on a permanent contract. On 8 December 2023, after being a regular starter during the year, he renewed his link until 2025.

== Career statistics ==
As of 6 February 2024

Club	Season	League			State League		Cup		Continental		Other		Total	
Club	Season	Division	Apps	Goals	Apps	Goals	Apps	Goals	Apps	Goals	Apps	Goals	Apps	Goals
Avaí	2019	Série A	0	0	3	0	1	0	—		—		4	0
Tombense (loan)	2020	Série C	15	0	9	0	—		—		—		24	0
Tombense (loan)	2021	Série C	20	0	6	0	1	0	—		—		27	0
Tombense (loan)	Subtotal		35	0	15	0	1	0	—		—		51	0
Ypiranga-RS (loan)	2022	Série C	1	0	14	2	—		—		—		15	2
Bahia	2022	Série B	7	0	—		3	0	—		—		10	0
CRB	2023	Série B	33	1	9	0	3	0	—		7 (Note: Appearance(s) in Copa do Nordeste)	0	52	1
CRB	2024	Série B	0	0	3	0	0	0	—		1	0	4	0
CRB	Subtotal		33	1	12	0	3	0	—		8	0	56	1
Career total			76	1	44	2	8	0	0	0	8	0	136	3

== Honours ==
CRB

- Campeonato Alagoano: 2023
