= Fabricio Domínguez =

Uruguayan footballer (born 1998)

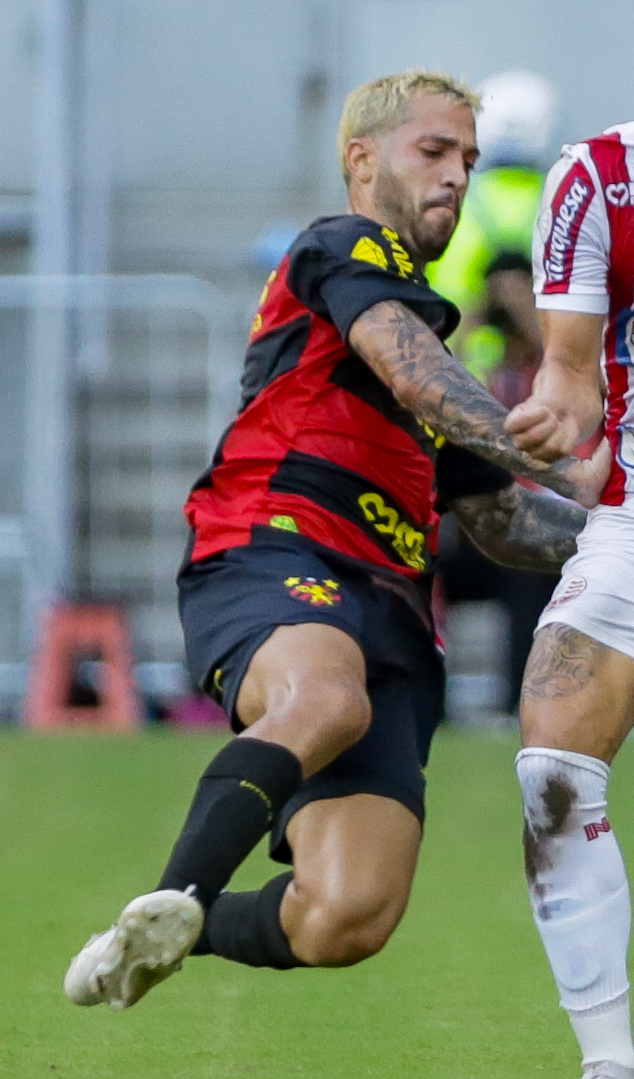
- Domínguez with Recife in 2024

Personal information
- Full name: Fabricio Domínguez Huertas
- Date of birth: 24 June 1998 (age 28)
- Place of birth: Montevideo, Uruguay
- Height: 1.77 m (5 ft 10 in)
- Position: Attacking midfielder

Team information
- Current team: Cerro Porteño
- Number: 2

Youth career
- 2017–2019: Racing Club

Senior career*
Years	Team	Apps	(Gls)
2019–2024	Racing Club	43	(2)
2019–2020	→ Tigre (loan)	10	(0)
2022	→ Defensa y Justicia (loan)	13	(1)
2023	→ Argentinos Juniors (loan)	21	(0)
2024	→ Sport Recife (loan)	42	(10)
2025	Sport Recife	13	(1)
2025–	Cerro Porteño	5	(0)
- * Club domestic league appearances and goals as of 12 August 2025

Fabricio Domínguez Huertas (born 24 June 1998) is a Uruguayan professional footballer who plays as an attacking midfielder for the Paraguayan club Cerro Porteño.

== Career ==
Born in Montevideo, Domínguez moved to Argentina with Racing Club in 2017; amid Independiente interest. He made the substitutes' bench in September 2018 for a Primera División win over Unión Santa Fe. In August 2019, Domínguez was loaned to Primera B Nacional with Tigre. His senior debut arrived on 18 August in a home defeat to Quilmes, which preceded eleven further appearances; including two in the Copa Libertadores against Palmeiras and Bolívar. His loan was cut short due to the COVID-19 pandemic. In the succeeding November, Domínguez made his competitive Racing debut versus Atlético Tucumán.

On 7 July 2022, Domínguez was loaned out from Racing Club, to fellow league club Defensa y Justicia until the end of 2023 with a purchase option.

== Career statistics ==
As of 20 November 2020.

Appearances and goals by club, season and competition
Club	Season	League			Cup		League Cup		Continental		Other		Total	
Club	Season	Division	Apps	Goals	Apps	Goals	Apps	Goals	Apps	Goals	Apps	Goals	Apps	Goals
Racing Club	2019–20	Primera División	0	0	0	0	0	0	0	0	0	0	0	0
Racing Club	2020–21 (Note: Soccerway counts Copa de la Liga Profesional appearances as league appearances.)	Primera División	1	0	0	0	0	0	0	0	0	0	1	0
Racing Club	Total		1	0	0	0	0	0	0	0	0	0	1	0
Tigre (loan)	2019–20	Primera B Nacional	10	0	0	0	—		2 (Note: Appearance(s) in the Copa Libertadores)	0	0	0	12	0
Career total			11	0	0	0	0	0	2	0	0	0	13	0
