= Douglas (footballer, born 1995) =

Brazilian footballer

Personal information
- Full name: Douglas Matheus do Nascimento
- Date of birth: 23 March 1995 (age 31)
- Place of birth: Santa Cruz do Sul, Brazil
- Height: 1.90 m (6 ft 3 in)
- Position: Centre-back

Team information
- Current team: Botafogo PB

Senior career*
Years	Team	Apps	(Gls)
2015	Juventude	16	(0)
2016	Veranópolis	8	(0)
2016	Pelotas	5	(1)
2016	Barra	1	(0)
2017	Veranópolis	11	(0)
2017–2019	São Bernardo	20	(0)
2018	→ Red Bull Brasil (loan)	13	(0)
2019	→ Atlético Goianiense (loan)	3	(0)
2019	→ Ypiranga RS (loan)	7	(0)
2020	Operário Ferroviário	8	(0)
2020–2021	Ypiranga RS	34	(3)
2021	→ Santo André (loan)	0	(0)
2022–2023	CSA	20	(2)
2023	Manaus	12	(3)
2024–	Botafogo PB	8	(0)
- * Club domestic league appearances and goals as of 17:46, 1 April 2024 (UTC)

Douglas Matheus do Nascimento, commonly known as Douglas is a Brazilian footballer who plays as a centre-back for Botafogo PB.

== Career ==
=== Juventude ===
Douglas made his league debut against Ypiranga RS on 1 February 2015.

=== First spell at Veranópolis ===
Douglas made his league debut against SC Internacional on 24 February 2016."Internacional vs Veranópolis - 24 February 2016". Soccerway.

=== Second spell at Veranópolis ===
Douglas made his league debut against EC São José on 5 February 2017.

=== São Bernardo ===
Douglas made his league debut against São Bernardo FC on 21 May 2017.

=== Red Bull Brasil ===
Douglas made his debut in the Copa Paulista against XV de Piracicaba on 4 August 2018.

=== Atlético Goianiense ===
Douglas joined Atlético Goianiense. He made his league debut against Anapolina on 30 January 2019.

=== First spell at Ypiranga RS ===
Douglas made his league debut against Tombense on 27 July 2019.

=== Operário Ferroviário ===
Douglas made his league debut against Cascavel CR on 19 January 2020.

=== Second spell at Ypiranga RS ===
During his second spell at the club, Douglas made his league debut against Londrina on 16 August 2020. He scored his first goal for the club against Tombense on 6 September 2020, scoring in the 76th minute.

=== CSA ===
Douglas made his league debut against Aliança AL on 20 January 2022. He scored his first goal for the club against Murici FC on 12 April 2022, scoring in the 22nd minute.

=== Manaus ===
Douglas scored on his league debut for Manaus, scoring in the 82nd minute against Náutico on 3 May 2023.

=== Botafogo PB ===
Douglas made his league debut against EC Jacuipense on 7 January 2024.
