= Clube Atlético Colatinense =

Colatinense
- Full name: Clube Atlético Colatinense
- Nickname(s): Alvinegro
- Founded: October 17, 2005
- Ground: Estádio Municipal Justiniano de Melo e Silva, Colatina, Espírito Santo state, Brazil
- Capacity: 12,000
| Home colours | Away colours |

Clube Atlético Colatinense, commonly known as Colatinense, is a Brazilian football club based in Colatina, Espírito Santo state.

== History ==
The club was founded on October 17, 2005. Colatinense won the Campeonato Capixaba Second Level in 2006.

== Achievements ==
- Campeonato Capixaba Second Level:
  - Winners (1): 2006

== Stadium ==
Clube Atlético Colatinense play their home games at Estádio Municipal Justiniano de Melo e Silva. The stadium has a maximum capacity of 12,000 people.
