= Gustavo Apis =

Brazilian footballer (born 1999)

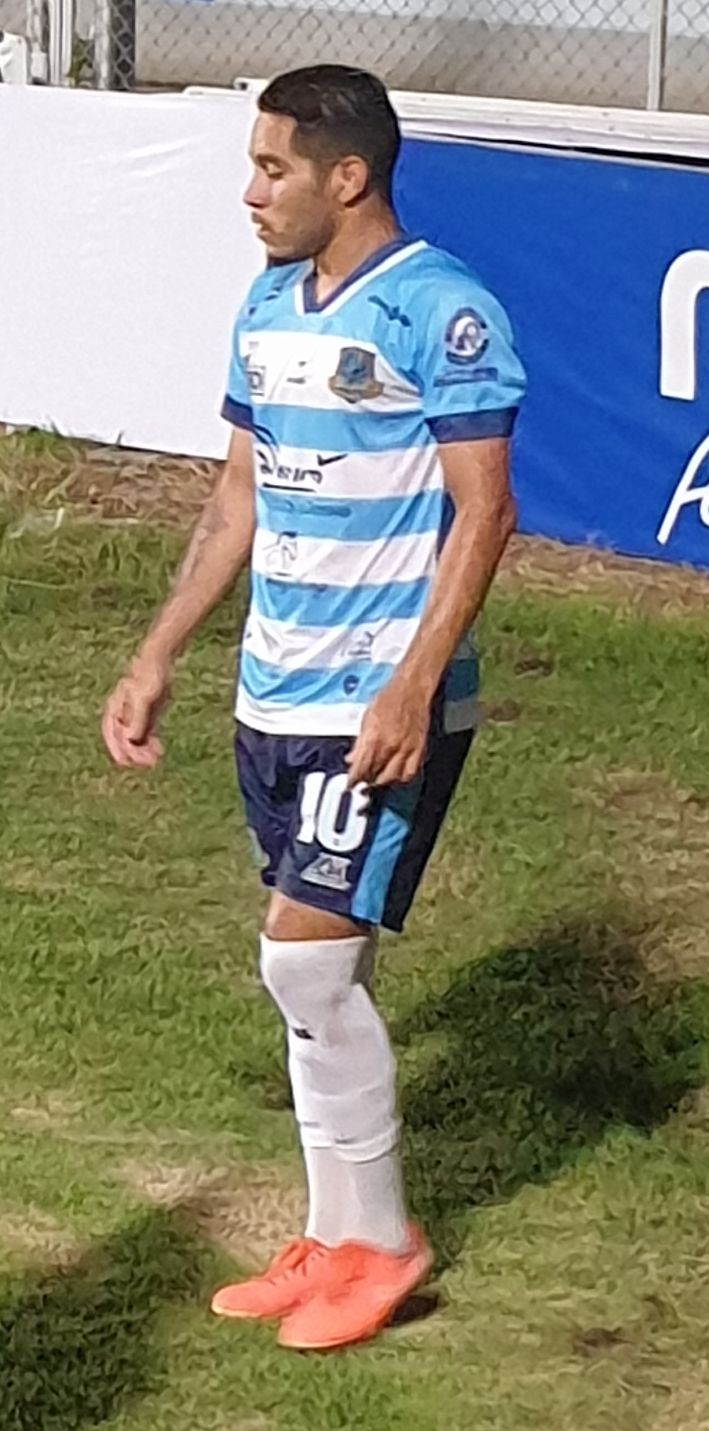

Personal information
- Full name: Gustavo Apis Pascoal de Farias
- Date of birth: 14 June 1999 (age 27)
- Place of birth: Nova Iguaçu, Brazil
- Height: 1.76 m (5 ft 9 in)
- Position: Midfielder

Team information
- Current team: Sukhothai

Youth career
- 2007–2019: Nova Iguaçu

Senior career*
Years	Team	Apps	(Gls)
2018–2021	Nova Iguaçu	37	(8)
2021	→ Fluminense (loan)	1	(0)
2021–2025	Fluminense	6	(0)
2022	→ CRB (loan)	17	(0)
2024	→ Nova Iguaçu (loan)	11	(1)
2025–2026	Pattaya United	29	(11)
2026–	Sukhothai	0	(0)
- * Club domestic league appearances and goals as of 05:45, 27 May 2026 (UTC)

Gustavo Apis Pascoal de Farias (born 14 June 1999), known as Gustavo Apis, is a Brazilian footballer who plays as a midfielder for Sukhothai.

== Club career ==
Born in Nova Iguaçu, Rio de Janeiro, Gustavo Apis joined hometown side Nova Iguaçu FC at the age of seven. He made his senior debut on 6 May 2018, coming on as a late substitute in a 1–4 Série D away loss against Caxias.

Gustavo Apis scored his first senior goal on 27 May 2018, netting the opener in a 2–0 home win over Mirassol. On 25 February 2021, he moved to Fluminense on loan, and was initially assigned to the under-23 squad.

Gustavo Apis made his Flu – and Série A – debut on 10 July 2021, replacing Paulo Henrique Ganso late into a 2–1 away success over Sport Recife. On 3 September, he signed a permanent deal with the club until 2025.

== Career statistics ==
As of 10 November 2021

Club	Season	League			State League		Cup		Continental		Other		Total	
Club	Season	Division	Apps	Goals	Apps	Goals	Apps	Goals	Apps	Goals	Apps	Goals	Apps	Goals
Nova Iguaçu	2018	Série D	3	1	—		—		—		1 (Note: Appearance(s) in Copa Rio)	1	4	2
Nova Iguaçu	2019	Carioca	—		2	0	—		—		—		2	0
Nova Iguaçu	2020	Carioca / Carioca B1	—		24	3	—		—		—		24	3
Nova Iguaçu	2021	Carioca	—		7	2	—		—		—		7	2
Nova Iguaçu	Total		3	1	33	5	—		—		1	1	37	7
Fluminense	2021	Série A	4	0	—		1	0	—		—		5	0
Career total			7	1	33	5	1	0	0	0	1	1	42	7
