= Fábio Alemão =

Brazilian footballer (born 1996)

Personal information
- Full name: Fábio Augusto Schirmann
- Date of birth: 8 October 1996 (age 30)
- Place of birth: Três Passos, Brazil
- Height: 1.84 m (6 ft 0 in)
- Position: Centre-back

Team information
- Current team: CRB
- Number: 27

Youth career
- Juventude
- 2016–2017: Internacional

Senior career*
Years	Team	Apps	(Gls)
2015	Juventude	0	(0)
2017	Internacional B	23	(1)
2017–2021	Internacional	0	(0)
2018–2019	→ Paysandu (loan)	6	(0)
2020	→ Bahia	2	(0)
2020	→ Pelotas	14	(1)
2020–2021	→ Operário Ferroviário	49	(3)
2022	Sport Recife	20	(0)
2023–	CRB	104	(4)
- * Club domestic league appearances and goals as of 16 November 2026

Fábio Augusto Schirmann (born 8 October 1996), known as Fábio Alemão, is a Brazilian professional footballer who plays as a centre-back for CRB.

== Career ==
Born in Três Passos, Rio Grande do Sul, Fábio Alemão played for the youth sides of Juventude and made his senior debut with the club in the 2015 Copa Metropolitana. Ahead of the 2016 season, he moved to Internacional and returned to the youth setup.

Fábio Alemão won the 2017 Campeonato Gaúcho Série B with the B-team before starting to feature in first team trainings in October of that year. On 5 September 2018, after failing to make a first team appearance, he was loaned to Série B side Paysandu for one year.

On 1 June 2019, after featuring rarely, Fábio Alemão returned to Inter after his loan ended. After featuring again with the B-side, he moved to Bahia on loan on 22 November of that year.

In July 2020, after again being rarely used, Fábio Alemão moved to Pelotas also in a temporary deal. A regular starter, he was announced at Operário Ferroviário on 2 December 2020.

On 11 January 2022, Fábio Alemão signed a permanent one-year contract with Sport Recife. Mainly a backup option, he moved to fellow second division team CRB on 8 December.

== Career statistics ==
As of 6 February 2024

Club	Season	League			State League		Cup		Continental		Other		Total	
Club	Season	Division	Apps	Goals	Apps	Goals	Apps	Goals	Apps	Goals	Apps	Goals	Apps	Goals
Juventude	2015	Série C	0	0	—		—		—		7 (Note: Five appearances in Copa Metropolitana, two appearances in Copa FGF)	0	7	0
Internacional B	2017	Gaúcho Série B	—		23	1	—		—		—		23	1
Internacional	2017	Série B	0	0	—		0	0	—		8 (Note: Appearance(s) in Copa FGF)	0	8	0
Internacional	2018	Série A	0	0	—		0	0	—		1	0	1	0
Internacional	2019	Série A	0	0	—		0	0	—		10	0	10	0
Internacional	Subtotal		0	0	—		0	0	—		19	0	19	0
Paysandu (loan)	2018	Série B	0	0	—		—		—		—		0	0
Paysandu (loan)	2019	Série C	1	0	5	0	0	0	—		—		6	0
Paysandu (loan)	Subtotal		1	0	5	0	0	0	—		—		6	0
Bahia (loan)	2020	Série A	0	0	2	0	0	0	—		0	0	2	0
Pelotas (loan)	2020	Série D	12	1	2	0	—		—		—		14	1
Operário Ferroviário (loan)	2020	Série B	6	1	—		—		—		—		6	1
Operário Ferroviário (loan)	2021	Série B	30	2	13	0	2	1	—		—		45	3
Operário Ferroviário (loan)	Subtotal		36	3	13	0	2	1	—		—		51	4
Sport Recife	2022	Série B	14	0	6	0	0	0	—		3 (Note: Appearance(s) in Copa do Nordeste)	0	23	0
CRB	2023	Série B	24	1	8	2	4	0	—		8	1	44	4
CRB	2024	Série B	0	0	3	0	0	0	—		1	1	4	1
CRB	Subtotal		24	1	11	2	4	0	—		9	2	48	5
Career total			87	5	62	3	6	1	0	0	35	2	190	11

== Honours ==
Internacional B

- Campeonato Gaúcho Série B: 2017

Bahia

- Campeonato Baiano: 2020

CRB

- Campeonato Alagoano: 2023
