= Carlos Alberto (footballer, born 1987) =

Brazilian footballer

Personal information
- Full name: Carlos Alberto Gomes de Lima
- Date of birth: 15 July 1987 (age 39)
- Place of birth: Belém, Brazil
- Height: 1.88 m (6 ft 2 in)
- Position: Striker

Youth career
- 2005–2006: Ceará
- 2007–2008: Grêmio

Senior career*
Years	Team	Apps	(Gls)
2009	Maranguape		
2010	Icasa		
2010	Guarany de Sobral		
2011	Crato		
2011	Guarani de Juazeiro		
2012	Torreense		
2012	Horizonte		
2013	Vitória da Conquista		
2013	São Bernardo		
2014	Tiradentes-CE		
2014	São Paulo-RS		
2015	Juazeirense		
2016	Potiguar		
2016	Sampaio Corrêa		
2017	XV de Piracicaba		
2018	Cabofriense		
2018	Caucaia		
2018–2020	Akhaa Ahli Aley	22	(7)
- * Club domestic league appearances and goals as of 6 October 2019

Carlos Alberto Gomes de Lima (born 15 July 1987), or simply Carlos Alberto, is a Brazilian professional footballer who plays as a striker.
