= Murici =

Municipality of Alagoas, Brazil

- Municipality
- Flag Coat of arms

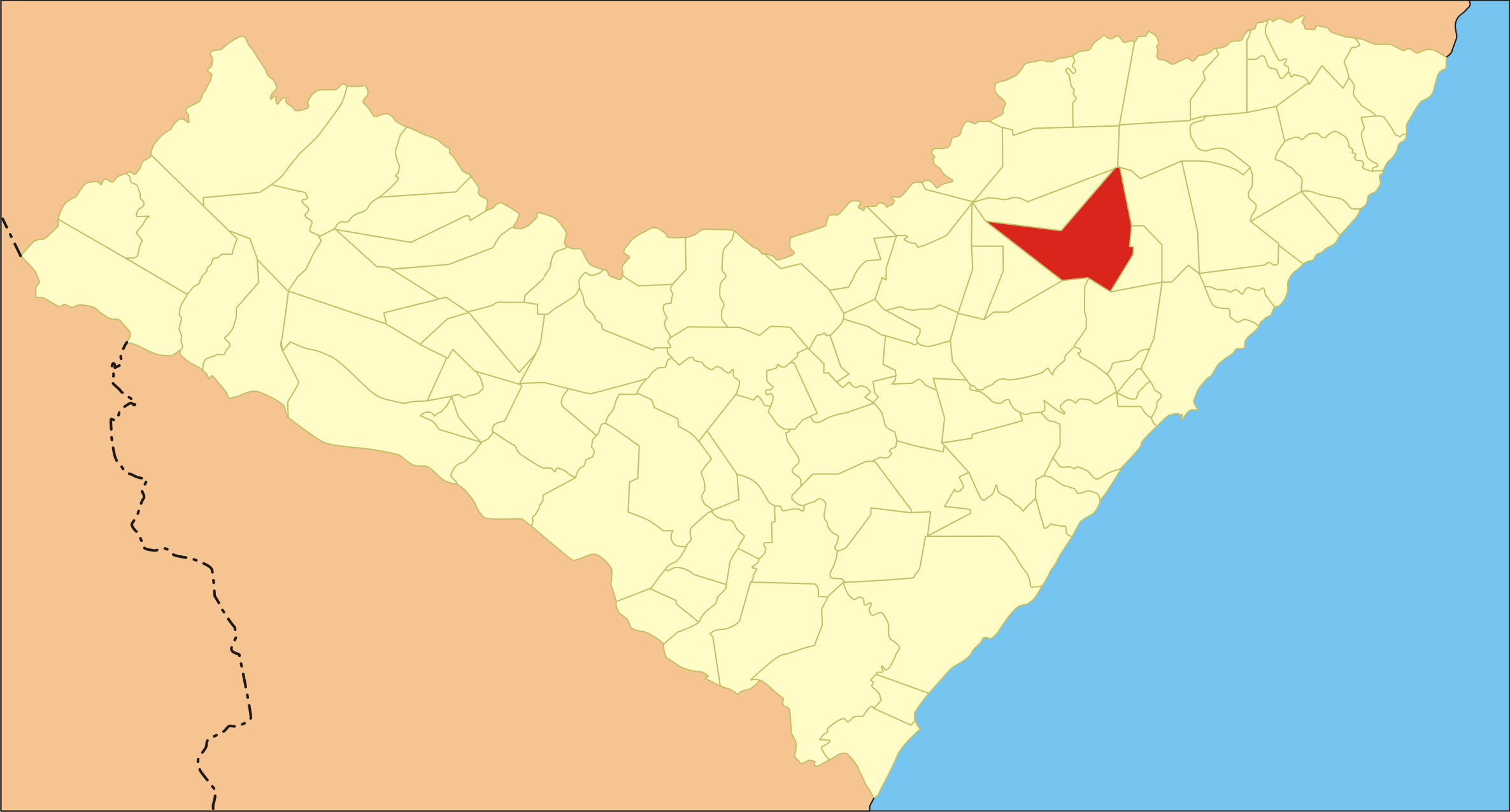

- Location in Brazil
- Coordinates: 9°18′25″S 35°56′34″W
- Country: Brazil
- State: Alagoas
- Established: 1892

Government
  - Prefect: Olavo Neto

Area
  - Total: 163.701 sq mi (423.983 km^{2})
- Elevation: 269 ft (82 m)

Population (2020)
  - Total: 28,333
- Time zone: UTC-3

Murici (Central northeastern portuguese pronunciation: [mʊɾiˈsiː]) is a municipality located in the east of the Brazilian state of Alagoas. Its population is 28,333 (2020) and its area is 424 km^{2} (164 sq mi). According to the Veja magazine, despite receiving generous public transfers, the city still lags behind most municipalities in Brazil in human development. 30.6% of its inhabitants are illiterate and 65% rely on Federal funds to survive, which contribute for an HDI of just 0.58, slightly below Iraq's HDI of 0.59.

The municipality contains 61% of the 6,116 hectares (15,110 acres) Murici Ecological Station, created in 2001.
