= Cristian Lucca =

Brazilian footballer (born 1990)

Personal information
- Date of birth: 17 December 1990 (age 35)
- Place of birth: Santo Ângelo, Brazil
- Height: 1.90 m (6 ft 3 in)
- Position: Defender

Team information
- Current team: ASA

Senior career*
Years	Team	Apps	(Gls)
2010	Santo Ângelo		
2011	Internacional B		
2011	Bassano	8	(0)
2012	São José-RS		
2013	Juventude		
2013	Santo Ângelo		
2013	Aimoré	0	(0)
2014–2015	Cascavel	0	(0)
2015–2017	Inter de Lages	16	(0)
2016	→ Marcílio Dias (loan)	1	(0)
2017	→ Al Tadhamon (loan)		
2018	Sinop	7	(0)
2018–2020	Akhaa Ahli	18	(2)
2020	Internacional de Lages	5	(0)
2021	Real Brasília	5	(0)
2021	América-RJ	15	(0)
2022	ASA	36	(0)
2022	Mamoré	2	(0)
2023—	ASA	33	(2)
- * Club domestic league appearances and goals as of 18:02, 21 April 2019 (UTC)

Cristian Lucca (born 17 December 1990) is a Brazilian footballer who currently plays as a defender for ASA.

== Career statistics ==
=== Club ===
As of 21 April 2019.

Club	Season	League			State League		Cup		Other		Total	
Club	Season	Division	Apps	Goals	Apps	Goals	Apps	Goals	Apps	Goals	Apps	Goals
Bassano	2011–12	Lega Pro Prima Divisione	8	0	–		0	0	0	0	8	0
Aimoré	2014	–			3 (Note: Appearances in the Campeonato Gaúcho)	0	0	0	0	0	3	0
Cascavel	2015	–			12 (Note: Appearances in the Campeonato Paraense)	0	0	0	0	0	12	0
Inter de Lages	2015	Série D	7	0	0	0	0	0	0	0	7	0
Inter de Lages	2016	Série D	9	0	16 (Note: Appearances in the Campeonato Catarinense)	0	1 (Note: Appearances in the Copa do Brasil)	0	0	0	26	0
Inter de Lages	Total		16	0	16	0	1	0	0	0	33	0
Marcílio Dias (loan)	2016	–			1 (Note: Appearances in the Campeonato Catarinense A2)	0	0	0	0	0	1	0
Sinop	2018	Série D	7	0	0	0	0	0	0	0	7	0
Akhaa Ahli	2018–19	Lebanese Premier League	18	2	–		0	0	0	0	18	2
Career total			49	2	32	0	1	0	0	0	82	2
