= Vitor Caetano =

Brazilian footballer

Personal information
- Full name: Vitor Caetano Ferreira
- Date of birth: 1 July 1999 (age 27)
- Place of birth: Apucarana, Brazil
- Height: 1.90 m (6 ft 3 in)
- Position: Goalkeeper

Team information
- Current team: CRB
- Number: 1

Youth career
- Figueirense

Senior career*
Years	Team	Apps	(Gls)
2018–2022	Figueirense	7	(0)
2019	→ Famalicão (loan)	0	(0)
2022–	CRB	46	(0)
- * Club domestic league appearances and goals as of 16 November 2026

Vitor Caetano Ferreira (born 1 July 1999) is a Brazilian professional footballer who plays as a goalkeeper for CRB.

== Career ==
Caetano made his professional debut with Figueirense in a 0–0 Campeonato Brasileiro Série B tie with Oeste on 3 November 2019. On 8 July 2019, he joined Famalicão on a year long loan.
