= List of villages in Alagoas =

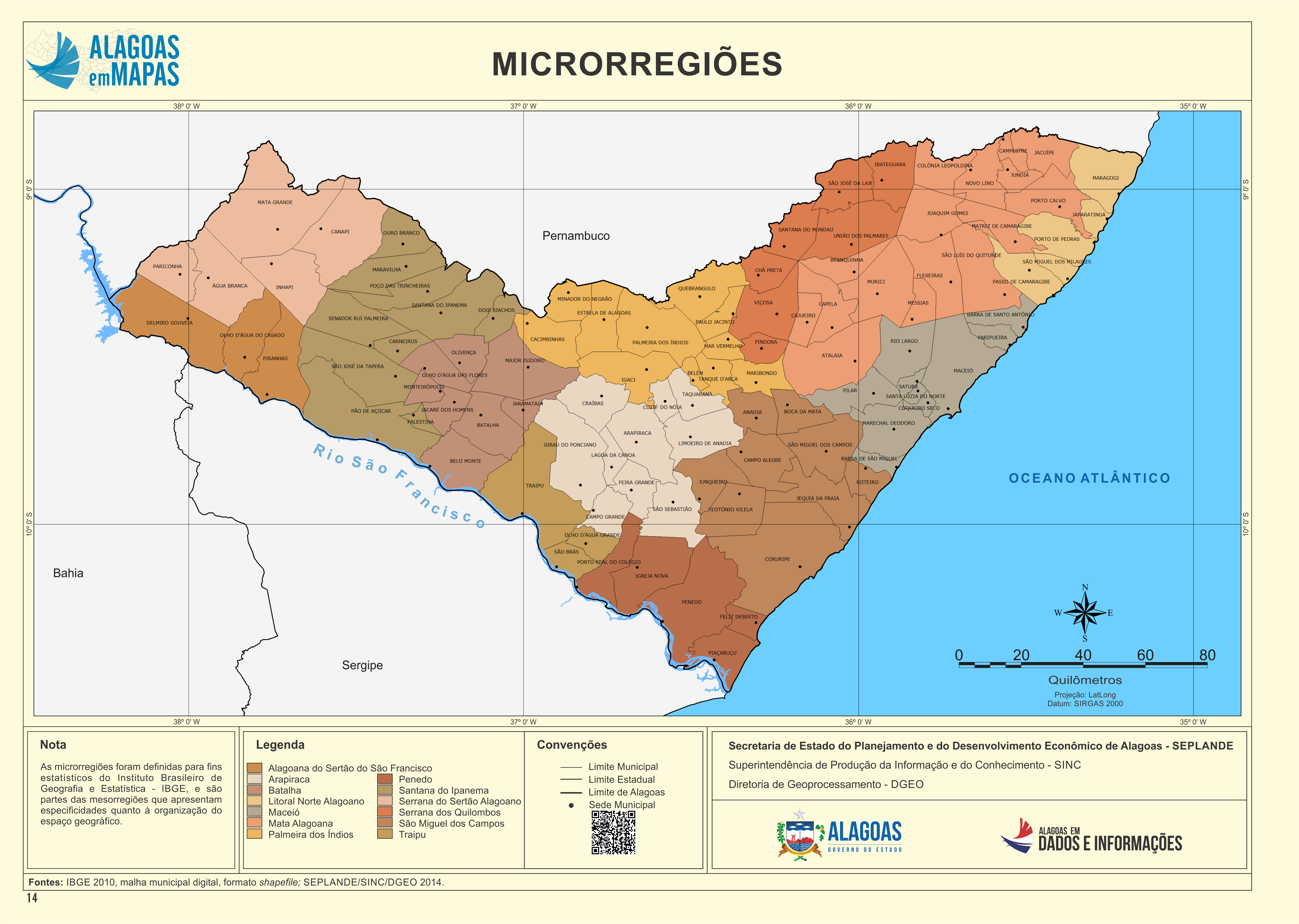
A map of the microregions of Alagoas

The Northeastern Brazilian state of Alagoas is composed of around 1400 villages spread across 102 municipalities, many of which originated as indigenous settlements or from the formation of quilombos. Villages are settlements located in the rural areas of municipalities, with populations varying from dozens to thousands.

== Zona da Mata Alagoana ==
=== Penedo Microregion ===
Municipality	Village	Population (2022)
Piaçabuçu	Pixaim	
Piaçabuçu	Pontal do Peba	
Piaçabuçu	Céu	
Piaçabuçu	Bonito	
Piaçabuçu	Barreiras	
Piaçabuçu	Paciência	
Piaçabuçu	Penedinho	
Piaçabuçu	Marituba	
Piaçabuçu	Retiro	
Feliz Deserto	Flexeiras	
Feliz Deserto	Pontes	
Penedo	Ponta Mofina	
Penedo	Ponta da Ilha	
Penedo	Capela	
Penedo	Riacho do Pedro	
Penedo	Riacho do Serrote	
Penedo	Marcação	
Penedo	Murici	
Penedo	Ponta da Várzea	
Penedo	Murituba do Peixe	
Penedo	Murituba de Baixo	
Penedo	Murituba de Cima	
Penedo	Santa Amélia	
Penedo	Peixoto	
Penedo	Manibu	
Penedo	Novo Horizonte	
Penedo	Campo Redondo	
Penedo	São José	
Penedo	Catrapó	
Penedo	Marizeiro	
Penedo	Tabuleiro dos Negros	
Penedo	Itaporanga	
Penedo	Campo Grande	
Penedo	Carapina	
Penedo	Pescoço	
Penedo	Santa Cândida	
Penedo	Palmeira Alta	
Penedo	Prosperidade	
Penedo	Conrado	
Penedo	Imbira	
Penedo	Santa Margarida	
Penedo	Castanho Grande	
Penedo	Espigão	
Igreja Nova	Chinaré	
Igreja Nova	Lagoa Grande	
Igreja Nova	Flexeiras	
Igreja Nova	Cruzes	
Igreja Nova	Palmeira dos Negros	
Igreja Nova	Vista Alegre	
Igreja Nova	Tapera	
Igreja Nova	Ipiranga	
Igreja Nova	Serraria	
Igreja Nova	Ilha das Antas	
Igreja Nova	Itapicuru	
Igreja Nova	Sapé	
Igreja Nova	São José	
Igreja Nova	Cedro	
Igreja Nova	Malamba	
Igreja Nova	Lagoa Comprida	
Igreja Nova	Curral do Meio	
Igreja Nova	Alagoinhas	
Igreja Nova	Perucaba	
Igreja Nova	Saco do Arroz	
Igreja Nova	Oiteiro	
Igreja Nova	Quaresma	
Igreja Nova	Alecrim	
Igreja Nova	Cabo do Pasto	
Igreja Nova	Capim Grosso	
Igreja Nova	Cotovelo	
Igreja Nova	Fazenda Nova	
Igreja Nova	Lagoa do Gado Bravo	
Igreja Nova	Jenipapo	
Igreja Nova	Santiago	
Porto Real do Colégio	Sobrado	
Porto Real do Colégio	Tapera de Itiúba	
Porto Real do Colégio	Barra do Itiúba	
Porto Real do Colégio	Carnaíbas	
Porto Real do Colégio	Castro	
Porto Real do Colégio	Itiúba	
Porto Real do Colégio	Kariri-Xocó	
Porto Real do Colégio	Tapera	
Porto Real do Colégio	Canoa de Baixo	
Porto Real do Colégio	Coqueiro da Maraba	
Porto Real do Colégio	Marabinha	
Porto Real do Colégio	Canoa de Cima	
Porto Real do Colégio	Retiro	
Porto Real do Colégio	Cajuero	
Porto Real do Colégio	Pau de Faceira	

=== São Miguel dos Campos Microregion ===
Municipality	Village	Population (2022)
Coruripe	Miaí de Cima	
Coruripe	Barreiras	
Coruripe	Lago do Pau	
Coruripe	Bonsucesso	
Coruripe	Botafogo	
Coruripe	Pindorama	
Coruripe	Lagoa Nova	
Coruripe	São Luís	
Coruripe	Tavares	
Coruripe	Alto Piauí	
Coruripe	Conceição	
Coruripe	Mangabeira	
Coruripe	Poxim	
Jequiá da Praia	Lagoa Azeda	
Jequiá da Praia	Marapé	
Jequiá da Praia	Ponta da Pedra	
Jequiá da Praia	Roçadinho	
Jequiá da Praia	França	
Jequiá da Praia	Cabeça	
Jequiá da Praia	Noite Grande	
Jequiá da Praia	Mutuca	
Jequiá da Praia	Sinimbu	
Jequiá da Praia	Jitirana	
Jequiá da Praia	Algodoeiro	
Jequiá da Praia	Paturais	
Jequiá da Praia	Alagoinhas	
Roteiro	Peru	
Teotônio Vilela	Gerais	
Teotônio Vilela	Birrus	
Teotônio Vilela	Abobreiras	
Teotônio Vilela	Imburi do Inácio	
Teotônio Vilela	Piauí	
Teotônio Vilela	Sucupira Torta	
Teotônio Vilela	Água de Meninos	
Teotônio Vilela	Guladim	
Teotônio Vilela	Camaçu	
Teotônio Vilela	Tapera	
Teotônio Vilela	Levanta do Pó	
Junqueiro	Ilha	
Junqueiro	Teixeira	
Junqueiro	Camboim	
Junqueiro	Barro Vermelho	
Junqueiro	Palmeirinha	
Junqueiro	Riachão	
Junqueiro	Coroa de Areia	
Junqueiro	Chapéu do Sul	
Junqueiro	Ladeira Grande	
Junqueiro	José da Rocha	
Junqueiro	Tamanduá	
Junqueiro	Brejo dos Bois	
Junqueiro	Olho d'água	
Junqueiro	Candurú	
Junqueiro	Mutuns	
Junqueiro	Cinzeiro	
Junqueiro	São Benedito	
Junqueiro	Grujaú	
Junqueiro	Dois Riachos	
Junqueiro	Sapucaia	
Junqueiro	Baixa Fria	
Campo Alegre	Luziapolis	
Campo Alegre	Belo Horizonte	
Campo Alegre	Vila Operária	
Campo Alegre	Mineiro	
São Miguel dos Campos	São Sebastião Ferreira	
São Miguel dos Campos	Roncador	
Boca da Mata	Periperi	
Boca da Mata	São Domingos	
Boca da Mata	São José	
Boca da Mata	Cajás	
Boca da Mata	Serra Boa Vista	
Boca da Mata	Pedra Limpa	
Anadia	Jaqueira	
Anadia	Serra das Morenas	
Anadia	Tabuleiro	
Anadia	Brejo Novo	
Anadia	Tapera	
Anadia	Limoeirinho	

=== Maceió Microregion ===
Municipality	Village	Population (2022)
Marechal Deodoro	Massagueira	
Marechal Deodoro	Barra Nova	
Marechal Deodoro	Santa Rita	
Marechal Deodoro	Francês	
Marechal Deodoro	Taperaguá	
Rio Largo	Munguba	
Rio Largo	Utinga	
Satuba	Primavera	
Satuba	Apolônia	
Satuba	Fuxico	
Santa Luzia do Norte	Mãos de Alagoas	
Coqueiro Seco	Cadoz	
Maceió	Rio Novo	
Maceió	Guaxuma	
Maceió	Garça Torta	
Maceió	Riacho Doce	
Maceió	Pescaria	
Maceió	Saúde	
Maceió	Ipioca	
Maceió	Terra	
Maceió	Meirim	
Barra de Santo Antônio	Santa Luzia	

=== Northern Coast Microregion ===
Municipality	Village	Population (2022)
Passo de Camaragibe	Barra de Camaragibe	
Passo de Camaragibe	Bom Despacho	
Passo de Camaragibe	Agrovila	
Passo de Camaragibe	Periperi	
São Miguel dos Milagres	Porto da Rua	
São Miguel dos Milagres	Riacho de Antônio Dias	
Porto de Pedras	Tatuamunha	
Porto de Pedras	Lajes	
Porto de Pedras	Pestana	
Porto de Pedras	Lucena	
Porto de Pedras	Curtume	
Japaratinga	Pontal do Boqueirão	
Japaratinga	Boqueirão	
Japaratinga	Barreira do Boqueirão	
Japaratinga	Barreiras	
Japaratinga	Santa Luzia	
Japaratinga	Pau Amarelo	
Japaratinga	São Gonçalo	
Maragogi	São Bento	
Maragogi	Aquidabã	
Maragogi	Fazenda	
Maragogi	Samba	
Maragogi	Caramuru	
Maragogi	Mangebura	
Maragogi	Costa Dourada	
Maragogi	Bom Jesus	
Maragogi	Barra Grande	
Maragogi	Antunes	
Maragogi	Ponta do Mangue	
Maragogi	Água Fria	
Maragogi	Junco	
Maragogi	Buenos Aires	
Maragogi	Santa Rita	
Maragogi	Massangana	

=== Mata Alagoana Microregion ===
Municipality	Village	Population (2022)
Atalaia	Santo Antônio	
Atalaia	Coité	
Atalaia	São Macário	
Atalaia	Sapucaia	
Atalaia	Branca de Atalaia	
Atalaia	Já de Jaqueira	
Atalaia	Porangaba	
Atalaia	Estiva	
Atalaia	Bom Jesus	
Atalaia	Ouricuri	
Atalaia	Lajes	
Atalaia	Boa Fé	
Atalaia	Milton Santos	
Atalaia	Margarida Alves	
Cajueiro	Triunfo	
Cajueiro	Pitimiju	
Cajueiro	Loango	
Capela	Boa Esperança	
Capela	Santa Efigênia	
Capela	Vieira	
Murici	Itamaracá	
Murici	Urucu	
Murici	Bananal	
Murici	Palha Branca	
Murici	São Pedro	
Murici	Sítio Velho	
Murici	Santo Antônio	
Murici	Dom Helder	
Murici	Pacas	
Branquinha	Nova Esperança	
Branquinha	Dois Branços	
Branquinha	Zumbi dos Palmares	
Branquinha	Flor do Mundaú	
Branquinha	Santo Antônio da Boa Vista	
Branquinha	Ramos	
Messias	Flor do Bosque	
Flexeiras	Mangueira	
Flexeiras	Uberaba	
Flexeiras	Peixe	
Flexeiras	Sebastião Gomes	
São Luís do Quitunde	Lagoa Vermelha	
São Luís do Quitunde	Peixe	
São Luís do Quitunde	Poço D'antas	
São Luís do Quitunde	Bananal	
São Luís do Quitunde	Periperi	
São Luís do Quitunde	Riachão	
São Luís do Quitunde	Amor	
São Luís do Quitunde	Papuã	
São Luís do Quitunde	Bom Conselho	
São Luís do Quitunde	Duas Barras	
Joaquim Gomes	Vila Guará	
Joaquim Gomes	Agrisa	
Joaquim Gomes	Wassu Urucu	
Joaquim Gomes	Fidel Castro	
Joaquim Gomes	Serrana	
Joaquim Gomes	Wassu Cocal	
Matriz de Camaragibe	Carrilho	
Colônia Leopoldina	Flor da Serra	
Colônia Leopoldina	Porto Alegre	
Colônia Leopoldina	Taquara	
Colônia Leopoldina	Monte Alegre	
Novo Lino	Viração	
Novo Lino	Vitória	
Novo Lino	Macapá	
Novo Lino	Porto Rico	
Porto Calvo	Caxangá	
Porto Calvo	Ilha	
Porto Calvo	Quitanda	
Porto Calvo	Maciape	
Porto Calvo	Santa Maria	
Porto Calvo	Conceição	
Porto Calvo	Boa União	
Porto Calvo	Boa União	
Jundiá	Campos de Jundiá	
Jacuípe	Espinho	
Jacuípe	Boa Vista	
Jacuípe	Canafístula	

=== Quilombo Hills Microregion ===
Municipality	Village	Population (2022)
Ibateguara	Canastra	
Ibateguara	Horizonte	
Ibateguara	Jussara	
Ibateguara	Laranjeiras	
Ibateguara	Roçadinho	
Ibateguara	Bananeira	
Ibateguara	Bastiões	
São José da Laje	Serra Grande	
São José da Laje	Goiabeira	
São José da Laje	Roncadeira	
São José da Laje	Caldeirões	
São José da Laje	Caruru	
São José da Laje	Gravatá	
São José da Laje	Pau D'arco	
União dos Palmares	Pindoba	
União dos Palmares	Rocha Cavalcante	
União dos Palmares	Santa Maria	
União dos Palmares	Serra da Imbira	
União dos Palmares	Muquém	
União dos Palmares	Laginha	
União dos Palmares	Serra da Barriga	
União dos Palmares	Timbó	
União dos Palmares	Dois Braços	
União dos Palmares	Canaã	
Santana do Mundaú	Água Fria	
Santana do Mundaú	Brejo Grande	
Santana do Mundaú	Chapéu de Pena	
Santana do Mundaú	chã de Areia	
Santana do Mundaú	Barro Branco	
Santana do Mundaú	Brenhas	
Santana do Mundaú	Xiringa	
Santana do Mundaú	Amoras	
Santana do Mundaú	Riacho do Brejo	
Santana do Mundaú	Munguba	
Santana do Mundaú	Morro dos Cachorros	
Santana do Mundaú	Filús	
Santana do Mundaú	Duas Barras	
Santana do Mundaú	Estivas	
Santana do Mundaú	Mirim	
Santana do Mundaú	Jussara	
Santana do Mundaú	Jussarinha	
Santana do Mundaú	Mariana	
Viçosa	Queimadinho	
Viçosa	Santa Luzia	
Viçosa	Dourada	
Viçosa	Serra dos Mamões	
Viçosa	Jussara	
Viçosa	Assembléia	
Viçosa	Caçamba	
Viçosa	São Luiz	
Viçosa	Anel	
Viçosa	Tangil	
Viçosa	Cascuda	
Viçosa	Bananal	
Viçosa	Sabalangá	
Pindoba	Pimentas	
Pindoba	Jereba	

== Agreste Alagoano ==
=== Traipu Microregion ===
Municipality	Village	Population (2022)
Traipu	Lagoinha	
Traipu	Boa Sorte	
Traipu	Mumbaça	
Traipu	Brejo Redondo	
Traipu	Uruçu	
Traipu	Santo Antônio	
Traipu	Saco dos Bois	
Traipu	Bom Jardim	
Traipu	Aconã	
Traipu	Traíras	
Traipu	Marcação	
Traipu	Olho d'Água do Campo	
Traipu	Olho d'Água da Cerca	
Traipu	Olho d'Água Preta	
Traipu	Patos	
Traipu	Cazuqui	
Traipu	Batalha	
Traipu	Jacobina	
Traipu	Fiação	
Traipu	Capim Grosso	
Traipu	Macacos	
Traipu	Lagoa Grande	
Traipu	Piranhas	
Traipu	Capivaras	
Traipu	Santa Cruz	
Traipu	Jacioba	
Traipu	Tabuleiro	
Traipu	Belo Horizonte	
Traipu	Pista	
Traipu	Girau do Ponciano	
Traipu	Areias de Santa Cruz	
Traipu	Bom Caradá	
São Brás	Girau do Itiúba	
São Brás	Sampaio	
São Brás	Tibiri	
São Brás	Massaranduba	
São Brás	Mão de Engenho	
São Brás	São Borges	
Olho d'Água Grande	Barra Dantas	
Olho d'Água Grande	Ponta da Serra	
Olho d'Água Grande	Sucupira	
Olho d'Água Grande	Olho d'Água Pequeno	
Olho d'Água Grande	Oiteiro Alto	

=== Arapiraca Microregion ===
Municipality	Village	Population (2022)
São Sebastião	Gado Bravo	
São Sebastião	Sapé	
São Sebastião	Capim Branco	
São Sebastião	Cana Brava	
São Sebastião	Pedra Preta	
São Sebastião	Cedro	
São Sebastião	Karapotó	
São Sebastião	Curralinho	
São Sebastião	Terra Nova	
São Sebastião	Salobro	
São Sebastião	Poço Verde	
São Sebastião	Brejinho	
São Sebastião	Lagoa Seca	
São Sebastião	Ponto Novo	
São Sebastião	Maracujá	
São Sebastião	Piauí	
São Sebastião	Prata	
São Sebastião	Perna Gorda	
São Sebastião	Mataquiri	
São Sebastião	Estrada Nova	
São Sebastião	Mata	
São Sebastião	Flexeiras	
São Sebastião	Malhada da Onça	
São Sebastião	Serra	
São Sebastião	Belisca Pau	
São Sebastião	Gongo	
São Sebastião	Limoeirinho	
Feira Grande	Poço Verde	
Feira Grande	Tabocal	
Feira Grande	Oiti	
Feira Grande	Mumbaça	
Feira Grande	Imbiriçu	
Feira Grande	Olho d'Água do Mandacaru	
Feira Grande	Cabaceiras	
Feira Grande	Taboquinha	
Feira Grande	Cajarana	
Feira Grande	Olho d'Água das Dandanhas	
Feira Grande	Mata	
Feira Grande	Pilões	
Feira Grande	Varzinha	
Feira Grande	Jabuticaba	
Feira Grande	Massapê	
Feira Grande	Mumbaçinha	
Feira Grande	Mocambinho	
Feira Grande	Tingui-Botó	
Feira Grande	olho d'Água do Meio	
Feira Grande	Mocambo	
Feira Grande	Taboca	
Feira Grande	Tanquinho	
Feira Grande	Candara	
Feira Grande	Massaranduba	
Feira Grande	Santana	
Feira Grande	Pocinho	
Feira Grande	Padre Cícero	
Feira Grande	Baixa da Onça	
Campo Grande	Alto das Pedras	
Campo Grande	Ipioca	
Campo Grande	Grota Funda	
Campo Grande	Poço do Boi	
Campo Grande	Curral Falso	
Girau do Ponciano	Cabaças	
Girau do Ponciano	Algodão	
Girau do Ponciano	Inhames	
Girau do Ponciano	Boa Vista	
Girau do Ponciano	Lagoinha	
Girau do Ponciano	Quebra Dente	
Girau do Ponciano	Carrasco	
Girau do Ponciano	Mateus	
Girau do Ponciano	Paraná	
Girau do Ponciano	Riacho do Sol	
Girau do Ponciano	Nicolau	
Girau do Ponciano	Poço	
Girau do Ponciano	Serrinha	
Girau do Ponciano	Caldeirões	
Girau do Ponciano	Rancho	
Girau do Ponciano	Canafístula	
Girau do Ponciano	Barbosa	
Girau do Ponciano	Lagoa Grande	
Girau do Ponciano	Desidério	
Girau do Ponciano	Boqueirão das Pastoras	
Girau do Ponciano	Baixio	
Girau do Ponciano	Maluda	
Girau do Ponciano	Boqueirão de Baixo	
Girau do Ponciano	Alecrim	
Girau do Ponciano	Primeiro de Maio	
Girau do Ponciano	Pitubas	
Girau do Ponciano	Deus é Fiel	
Girau do Ponciano	Carro Queimado	
Girau do Ponciano	Alto do Periquito	
Girau do Ponciano	Jaboticaba	
Girau do Ponciano	Salobro	
Girau do Ponciano	Craíbas dos Ferros	
Girau do Ponciano	Roseli Nunes	
Girau do Ponciano	Maravilha	
Lagoa da Canoa	Antonica	
Lagoa da Canoa	Jenipapo	
Lagoa da Canoa	Barro Preto	
Lagoa da Canoa	Lagoa da Pedra	
Lagoa da Canoa	Pau d'Arco	
Lagoa da Canoa	Mundo Novo	
Lagoa da Canoa	Lagoa Grande	
Lagoa da Canoa	Mata Limpa	
Lagoa da Canoa	Pintada	
Lagoa da Canoa	Alexandre	
Lagoa da Canoa	Santa Izabel	
Arapiraca	Baixa Grande	
Arapiraca	Farrinheira	
Arapiraca	Flexeiras	
Arapiraca	Mangabeiras	
Arapiraca	Pilões	
Arapiraca	Poço	
Arapiraca	Poço da Pedra de Cima	
Arapiraca	Poço de Baixo	
Arapiraca	Poço de Santana	
Arapiraca	Quati	
Arapiraca	Retiro	
Arapiraca	Rio dos Bichos	
Arapiraca	São Lourenço	
Arapiraca	Serra da Massa	
Arapiraca	Tabocas	
Arapiraca	Taquara	
Arapiraca	Varginha	
Arapiraca	Baixa da Onça	
Arapiraca	Baixa do Capim	
Arapiraca	Alazão	
Arapiraca	Batingas	
Arapiraca	Boa Vista	
Arapiraca	Bálsamo	
Arapiraca	Bananeiras	
Arapiraca	Camadanta	
Arapiraca	Canaã	
Arapiraca	Bom Jardim	
Arapiraca	Cajarana	
Arapiraca	Gaspar	
Arapiraca	Jenipapo	
Arapiraca	Cangandu	
Arapiraca	Carrasco	
Arapiraca	Laranjal	
Arapiraca	Massaranduba	
Arapiraca	Lagoa da Pedra	
Arapiraca	Lagoa do Rancho	
Arapiraca	Pau d'Arco	
Arapiraca	Olho d'Água de Cima	
Arapiraca	Poço da Pedra	
Arapiraca	Sapucaia	
Arapiraca	Poção	
Arapiraca	Taboquinha	
Arapiraca	São Francisco	
Arapiraca	Aparecida	
Arapiraca	Ceci Cunha	
Arapiraca	Serrote dos Dias	
Arapiraca	Sitio do Capim	
Arapiraca	Bom Nome	
Arapiraca	Pitombeira	
Craíbas	Folha-Miúda	
Craíbas	Lagoinha dos Honórios	
Craíbas	Lagoa da Angélica	
Craíbas	Cupira	
Craíbas	Lagoa Torta	
Craíbas	Esporão	
Craíbas	Salgado	
Craíbas	Serrote do Algodão	
Craíbas	Arizona	
Craíbas	Pintado	
Craíbas	Pau Ferro	
Craíbas	Torrões	
Craíbas	Lagoa do Mel	
Craíbas	Lagoa da Cruz	
Craíbas	Santa Rosa	
Craíbas	Pixilinga	
Craíbas	Cabaceiro	
Craíbas	Ipojuco	
Craíbas	Lagoa da Areia	
Craíbas	Riachão	
Craíbas	Riacho da Palha	
Craíbas	Lagoa do Algodão	
Craíbas	Areia Branca	
Craíbas	Água Salgada	
Craíbas	Lagoa Nova	
Craíbas	Marruas	
Craíbas	Lagoa da Malhada	
Craíbas	Serrote Grande	
Craíbas	Logrador	
Craíbas	Barro Preto	
Craíbas	Palanqueta	
Craíbas	Retiro	
Craíbas	Mãe Rainha	
Craíbas	Alto Grande	
Craíbas	Serrotinho	
Craíbas	Serrote dos Neres	
Craíbas	Santo Antônio	
Limoeiro de Anadia	São Bento	
Limoeiro de Anadia	Camadanta	
Limoeiro de Anadia	Areado	
Limoeiro de Anadia	Pé Leve Velho	
Limoeiro de Anadia	Jacaré	
Limoeiro de Anadia	Timbó de Cima	
Limoeiro de Anadia	Baixinha	
Limoeiro de Anadia	Olho d'Água	
Limoeiro de Anadia	Tamanduá	
Limoeiro de Anadia	Lagoa do Mato	
Limoeiro de Anadia	Pé Leve	
Limoeiro de Anadia	Chã do Jenipapo	
Limoeiro de Anadia	Jenipapo	
Limoeiro de Anadia	Timbó de Baixo	
Limoeiro de Anadia	Rio Comprido	
Limoeiro de Anadia	Poço Comprido	
Limoeiro de Anadia	Chã do Miranda	
Limoeiro de Anadia	Oiti	
Limoeiro de Anadia	Urtigas	
Limoeiro de Anadia	Mocambo	
Limoeiro de Anadia	Mamoeiro	
Limoeiro de Anadia	Areia Branca	
Limoeiro de Anadia	Cadoz	
Limoeiro de Anadia	Papa Farinha	
Limoeiro de Anadia	Bela Vista	
Limoeiro de Anadia	Bom Sucesso	
Limoeiro de Anadia	Tipi	
Limoeiro de Anadia	Terra Nova	
Limoeiro de Anadia	Juá	
Limoeiro de Anadia	Areia Vermelha	
Limoeiro de Anadia	Cajueiro	
Limoeiro de Anadia	Canto	
Limoeiro de Anadia	Chã do Arame	
Limoeiro de Anadia	Poção	
Limoeiro de Anadia	Nicácia	
Limoeiro de Anadia	Bocão	
Limoeiro de Anadia	Ingazeira	
Limoeiro de Anadia	Brejo	
Limoeiro de Anadia	Miracema	
Limoeiro de Anadia	Gulandim	
Limoeiro de Anadia	Alto da Pimenta	
Limoeiro de Anadia	Vilão	
Limoeiro de Anadia	Covos	
Limoeiro de Anadia	Cacimbas	
Limoeiro de Anadia	Enchudia	
Limoeiro de Anadia	Cacimbinhas	
Limoeiro de Anadia	Tanque Velho	
Limoeiro de Anadia	Craíbas	
Limoeiro de Anadia	Baixa da Areia	
Limoeiro de Anadia	Jequiá do Sá	
Limoeiro de Anadia	Olho d'Água do Luiz Carlos	
Coité do Nóia	Bocão	
Coité do Nóia	Vassouras	
Coité do Nóia	Manoel Gomes	
Coité do Nóia	Pereira	
Coité do Nóia	Baxio	
Coité do Nóia	Branquinha	
Coité do Nóia	Coringa	
Coité do Nóia	Mumbuça	
Coité do Nóia	Oitizeiro de Baixo	
Coité do Nóia	Lagoa da Pedra	
Coité do Nóia	Alagoinha	
Coité do Nóia	Boqueirão do Ivo	
Coité do Nóia	Boa Vista	
Coité do Nóia	Poço da Abelha	
Coité do Nóia	Craíbas de São José	
Coité do Nóia	Barro Vermelho	
Coité do Nóia	Tingui Lunga	
Coité do Nóia	Poços do Lunga	
Taquarana	Rio ds Cruzes	
Taquarana	Salgado	
Taquarana	Cacimbas de Cima	
Taquarana	Pau Amarelo	
Taquarana	Boca da Mata	
Taquarana	Gado Bravo	
Taquarana	Andrequice	
Taquarana	Pau do Descanso	
Taquarana	Chã do Fojo	
Taquarana	Cancelas	
Taquarana	Várzea do Arroz	
Taquarana	Cruzeiro Verde	
Taquarana	Canafístula	
Taquarana	Lagoa do Coxo	
Taquarana	Mutamba Torta	
Taquarana	Murici	
Taquarana	align="right"|	
Taquarana	Porteiras	
Taquarana	Barro Preto	
Taquarana	Juazeiro	
Taquarana	Cruzes	
Taquarana	Mameluco	
Taquarana	Pau Viola	
Taquarana	Mata do Gobeu	
Taquarana	Lagoa Grande	
Taquarana	Canudos Velhos	
Taquarana	Passagem do Vigário	

=== Palmeira dos índios Microregion ===
Municipality	Village	Population (2022)
Maribondo	Oiteiro	
Maribondo	Santa Rosa	
Maribondo	Lagedo	
Maribondo	Serra José Correia	
Maribondo	Tamanduá	
Maribondo	Urumbeba	
Maribondo	Mata Verde	
Maribondo	Baixa da Areia	
Tanque d'Arca	Bom Jardim	
Tanque d'Arca	Bonito	
Tanque d'Arca	Aparecida	
Tanque d'Arca	São Bonfim	
Tanque d'Arca	Chiqueiro	
Tanque d'Arca	Periperi de Cima	
Tanque d'Arca	Periperi	
Tanque d'Arca	Rancho do Ingá	
Tanque d'Arca	Bananeira	
Tanque d'Arca	Coelha	
Tanque d'Arca	Várzea Verde	
Tanque d'Arca	Boa Vista	
Tanque d'Arca	Serra da Fazenda	
Tanque d'Arca	Reino Encantado	
Tanque d'Arca	Carrapato	
Belém	Geraldo	
Belém	Monte Douro	
Belém	Varas	
Belém	Laranjeiras	
Belém	Cabeça Dantas	
Belém	Barro Vermelho	
Belém	Serra dos Bangas	
Mar Vermelho	Canadá	
Mar Vermelho	Ferreiro	
Mar Vermelho	Macaúba	
Mar Vermelho	Sitio do Meio	
Mar Vermelho	Ladeira Grande	
Paulo Jacinto	Chorador	
Paulo Jacinto	Fernandes	
Paulo Jacinto	Lagoa do ingá	
Paulo Jacinto	São Francisco	
Quebrangulo	Rua Nova	
Quebrangulo	Lajes	
Quebrangulo	Manivas Romualdo	
Quebrangulo	Água Branca	
Quebrangulo	Barra Nova	
Quebrangulo	Juliana	
Quebrangulo	Merência	
Quebrangulo	Cabeça de Pacavira	
Palmeira dos Índios	Mandacaru	
Palmeira dos Índios	Lagoa do Rancho	
Palmeira dos Índios	Sitio do Meio	
Palmeira dos Índios	Lagoa Funda	
Palmeira dos Índios	Caraíba Torta	
Palmeira dos Índios	Uruçu	
Palmeira dos Índios	Gavião do Cima	
Palmeira dos Índios	Gavião de Baixo	
Palmeira dos Índios	Caraibinhas	
Palmeira dos Índios	Boa Vista do Tomé	
Palmeira dos Índios	São José de Baixo	
Palmeira dos Índios	Santo Antônio	
Palmeira dos Índios	Moreira	
Palmeira dos Índios	Bem-Te-Vi	
Palmeira dos Índios	Funil	
Palmeira dos Índios	Boa Vista	
Palmeira dos Índios	Poço da Onça	
Palmeira dos Índios	Coruripe do Cal	
Palmeira dos Índios	Lajes Caldeirão	
Palmeira dos Índios	Lagoa do Caldeirão	
Palmeira dos Índios	Canto Rico	
Palmeira dos Índios	Cabaceiro	
Palmeira dos Índios	Criminoso	
Palmeira dos Índios	Barra do Bonifácio	
Palmeira dos Índios	Tabacaria	
Palmeira dos Índios	Craíbas Dantas	
Palmeira dos Índios	Algodãozinho	
Palmeira dos Índios	Lagoa do Veados	
Palmeira dos Índios	Lagoa do Algodão	
Palmeira dos Índios	Baixio	
Palmeira dos Índios	Canafístula	
Palmeira dos Índios	Sementeira	
Palmeira dos Índios	Lagoa do Canto	
Palmeira dos Índios	Cafurna de Baixo	
Palmeira dos Índios	Batingas	
Palmeira dos Índios	Macaco	
Palmeira dos Índios	Serra do Muro	
Palmeira dos Índios	Vila Maria	
Palmeira dos Índios	Buenos Aires	
Palmeira dos Índios	Fazenda Canto	
Palmeira dos Índios	Bonifácio	
Palmeira dos Índios	Cafundó de Dentro	
Palmeira dos Índios	Serra de São José	
Palmeira dos Índios	Barro Vermelho	
Palmeira dos Índios	Serra da Mandioca	
Palmeira dos Índios	Luciana	
Palmeira dos Índios	Alto Vermelho	
Palmeira dos Índios	Riacho Santo	
Palmeira dos Índios	Serra das Pias	
Palmeira dos Índios	Riacho Fundo do Meio	
Palmeira dos Índios	Boqueirão	
Palmeira dos Índios	Amaro	
Palmeira dos Índios	Buzu	
Palmeira dos Índios	Coité	
Palmeira dos Índios	Mata da Cafurna	
Palmeira dos Índios	Cafurna de Baixo	
Palmeira dos Índios	Serra da Boa Vista	
Palmeira dos Índios	Monte Alegre	
Palmeira dos Índios	Gravataçu	
Palmeira dos Índios	Velha Ana	
Palmeira dos Índios	Anum Velho	
Palmeira dos Índios	Anum Novo	
Palmeira dos Índios	Pau-Sangue	
Palmeira dos Índios	Caldeirões de Cima	
Palmeira dos Índios	Boa Sorte	
Palmeira dos Índios	Alto do Frutuoso	
Igaci	Novo Rio	
Igaci	Medroso	
Igaci	Lagoa Redonda	
Igaci	Caraibinha dos Guilherminos	
Igaci	Lagoa Grande dos Basílios	
Igaci	Xéu	
Igaci	Travessão	
Igaci	Riachão	
Igaci	Guaribas	
Igaci	Dionísio	
Igaci	Lagoa de Cima	
Igaci	Palanqueta	
Igaci	São Tiago	
Igaci	Colônia	
Igaci	Lagoa do Félix	
Igaci	Jacaré	
Igaci	Jacarezinho	
Igaci	Lontra	
Igaci	Serra Verde	
Igaci	Marias Pretas	
Igaci	Lagoa Grande do Sertão	
Igaci	Lagoa das Craíbas	
Igaci	Jurema	
Igaci	Sariema	
Igaci	Lagoa Funda	
Igaci	Santo Antônio	
Igaci	Boa Vista	
Igaci	Lagoa Seca	
Igaci	Lagoa d'Água	
Igaci	Tatu	
Igaci	Mata Amarela	
Igaci	Lagoa da Pedra	
Igaci	Coité das Pinhas	
Igaci	Logradouro	
Igaci	Pé de Serra	
Igaci	Lagoa Comrpida	
Igaci	São José de Baixo	
Igaci	Serrote	
Igaci	Barro Vermelho	
Igaci	Lagoa do Capim	
Igaci	Ferros	
Igaci	Canafístula do Moreira	
Igaci	Caraibinha	
Estrela de Alagoas	Marcação	
Estrela de Alagoas	Ipueiras	
Estrela de Alagoas	Pé da Serra	
Estrela de Alagoas	Jiquiri	
Estrela de Alagoas	Rompe Gibão	
Estrela de Alagoas	Lagoa da Serra	
Estrela de Alagoas	Lagoa da Areia	
Estrela de Alagoas	Lagoa da Coroa	
Estrela de Alagoas	Itapecuru	
Estrela de Alagoas	Renascença	
Estrela de Alagoas	Serra do Bernardino	
Estrela de Alagoas	Barriguda	
Estrela de Alagoas	Lagoa do Mato	
Estrela de Alagoas	Gameleira	
Estrela de Alagoas	Lagoa Dantas	
Estrela de Alagoas	Lagoa Seca	
Estrela de Alagoas	Lagoa do Exú	
Estrela de Alagoas	Mata Burro	
Estrela de Alagoas	Santa Cruz	
Estrela de Alagoas	Torrões	
Estrela de Alagoas	Xexéu de Baixo	
Estrela de Alagoas	Xexéu de Cima	
Estrela de Alagoas	Lagoa dos Porcos	
Estrela de Alagoas	Lagoa da Areia dos Marianos	
Estrela de Alagoas	Lageiro do Nicácio	
Estrela de Alagoas	Serrote do Vento	
Estrela de Alagoas	Pilões	
Estrela de Alagoas	Lagoa do Mourão	
Estrela de Alagoas	Jurema	
Estrela de Alagoas	Salobrinho	
Estrela de Alagoas	Salgadinho	
Estrela de Alagoas	Mocó	
Minador do Negrão	Torta	
Minador do Negrão	Serrote	
Minador do Negrão	Jiquiri	
Minador do Negrão	Serra do Raimundo	
Minador do Negrão	Travessão	
Minador do Negrão	Mulungu	
Cacimbinhas	Pontas Brancas	
Cacimbinhas	Galinhas	
Cacimbinhas	Teixeira	
Cacimbinhas	Cruz do Meio	
Cacimbinhas	Timbaúba	
Cacimbinhas	Lagoa do Boi	
Cacimbinhas	Cachoeira	
Cacimbinhas	Lagoa da Pedra	
Cacimbinhas	Sitio Novo	
Cacimbinhas	Minador do Lúcio	
Cacimbinhas	Galinhas do Meio	
Cacimbinhas	Guaxinim	
Cacimbinhas	Santa Maria	
Cacimbinhas	Arueira	

=== Batalha Microregion ===
Municipality	Village	Population (2022)
Major Isidoro	Cachoeira do Zé Elias	
Major Isidoro	Capelinha	
Major Isidoro	Paraíso	
Major Isidoro	Nova Aparecida	
Major Isidoro	Travessia	
Major Isidoro	Riacho do Sertão	
Major Isidoro	Barra Nova	
Major Isidoro	Pilões	
Major Isidoro	Riacho dos Alexandres	
Major Isidoro	Curral Novo	
Major Isidoro	Lagoa Queimada	
Major Isidoro	Múquem	
Major Isidoro	Umbuzeiro	
Major Isidoro	Cupira	
Major Isidoro	Bezerra	
Major Isidoro	Puxinana	
Major Isidoro	Lagoa dos Cágados	
Major Isidoro	Pé de Serra	
Jaramataia	Altão	
Jaramataia	Igrejinha	
Jaramataia	Fazenda Nova	
Jaramataia	Jangada	
Jaramataia	São Pedro	
Jaramataia	Campo Alegre	
Jaramataia	Cágados	
Batalha	Dionel	
Batalha	Cajá dos Negros	
Batalha	Mamoeiro	
Batalha	Saúde de Cima	
Batalha	Saúde de Baixo	
Batalha	Manteiga	
Batalha	Timbaúba	
Batalha	Pau Ferro	
Batalha	Serra da Mão	
Batalha	Fornos	
Batalha	Bebedouro	
Batalha	Juazeiro	
Belo Monte	Barra do Ipanema	
Belo Monte	Prazeres	
Belo Monte	Jiboia	
Belo Monte	Monte Santo	
Belo Monte	Boqueiro	
Belo Monte	Aimoré	
Belo Monte	Jacobina	
Belo Monte	Maranhão	
Belo Monte	Restinga	
Belo Monte	Poço do Marco	
Belo Monte	Olho D'água Novo	
Belo Monte	Riacho da Jacobina	
Belo Monte	Poço de Pedras	
Belo Monte	Serrote das Aroeiras	
Jacaré dos Homens	Pau Ferro	
Jacaré dos Homens	Garrote	
Jacaré dos Homens	Caititu	
Jacaré dos Homens	Alto da Madeira	
Jacaré dos Homens	Ribeiras	
Jacaré dos Homens	Baixas	
Monteirópolis	Fazenda Velha	
Monteirópolis	Farias do Meio	
Monteirópolis	Paus Pretos	
Monteirópolis	Lagoa do Rancho	
Monteirópolis	São José	
Monteirópolis	Sobradinho	
Monteirópolis	Agreste	
Monteirópolis	Agreste Velho	
Monteirópolis	Lagoa das Ovelhas	
Olho d'Água das Flores	Luz do Dia	
Olho d'Água das Flores	Alto da Boa Vista	
Olho d'Água das Flores	Logrador	
Olho d'Água das Flores	Travessão	
Olho d'Água das Flores	Lagedo	
Olho d'Água das Flores	Amargosa	
Olho d'Água das Flores	Cacimba do Gato	
Olho d'Água das Flores	Garapa	
Olho d'Água das Flores	Areia Branca	
Olho d'Água das Flores	Guarani	
Olho d'Água das Flores	Andresa	
Olho d'Água das Flores	Gameleiro	
Olho d'Água das Flores	Pedrão	
Olho d'Água das Flores	Piau	
Olho d'Água das Flores	Malatinha	
Olho d'Água das Flores	Aguazinha	
Olho d'Água das Flores	Camaratuba	
Olho d'Água das Flores	Poços	
Olho d'Água das Flores	Sucupira	
Olivença	Lagoa dos Bois	
Olivença	Várzea Fria	
Olivença	São José	
Olivença	Poço do Touro	
Olivença	Baixa da Lama	
Olivença	Pé do Morro	
Olivença	Poço da Cacimba	
Olivença	Lagoa do Velho	
Olivença	Lagoa de Dentro	
Olivença	Alto Vermelho	
Olivença	Agrestino	
Olivença	Pau Preto	
Olivença	Lagoa da Onça	
Olivença	Riacho do Mel	
Olivença	Laje dos Canjos	
Olivença	Timbaúba	
Olivença	Fazenda Nova	
Olivença	Cachoeira Grande	
Olivença	Vilinha	

=== Santana do Ipanema Microregion ===
Municipality	Village	Population (2022)
Palestina	Santa Filomena	
Palestina	Santo Antônio	
Pão de Açúcar	Limoeiro	
Pão de Açúcar	Jacarezinho	
Pão de Açúcar	Santiago	
Pão de Açúcar	Espinhos	
Pão de Açúcar	Conceição	
Pão de Açúcar	Mata da Onça	
Pão de Açúcar	Ilha do Ferro	
Pão de Açúcar	Alemar	
Pão de Açúcar	Buqueirão	
Pão de Açúcar	Riacho Grande	
Pão de Açúcar	Lagoa da Areia	
Pão de Açúcar	Machado	
Pão de Açúcar	Poço De Sal	
Pão de Açúcar	Chifre de Bode	
Pão de Açúcar	Poço Grande	
Pão de Açúcar	Poça da Volta	
Pão de Açúcar	Poções	
Pão de Açúcar	Novo Gosto	
Pão de Açúcar	São José	
Pão de Açúcar	Boa Sorte	
Pão de Açúcar	Campo Novo	
Pão de Açúcar	Japão	
Pão de Açúcar	Pacu	
Pão de Açúcar	Xexéu	
Pão de Açúcar	Rua Nova	
Pão de Açúcar	Lagoa da Pedra	
Pão de Açúcar	Impueira	
Pão de Açúcar	Pontal	
Pão de Açúcar	Impueiras de Baixo	
Pão de Açúcar	Impueiras de Cima	
Pão de Açúcar	Umburana d'Água	
Pão de Açúcar	Lagoa da Sela	
Pão de Açúcar	Piedade	
São José da Tapera	Capim Grosso	
São José da Tapera	Baixa	
São José da Tapera	Torrões	
São José da Tapera	Baixa Grande	
São José da Tapera	Salgadinho	
São José da Tapera	Lagoa da Cobra	
São José da Tapera	Farias	
São José da Tapera	Cacimba de Barro	
São José da Tapera	Antas	
São José da Tapera	Pilões	
São José da Tapera	Pilão de Cima	
São José da Tapera	Caboclo	
São José da Tapera	Cacimba Cercada	
São José da Tapera	Olho d'Água do Padre	
São José da Tapera	Alto da Laranjeira	
São José da Tapera	Serrinha	
São José da Tapera	Verde	
São José da Tapera	Bananeira	
São José da Tapera	Marruá	
São José da Tapera	Mucambo	
São José da Tapera	Umburana	
São José da Tapera	Alexandrina	
São José da Tapera	Água Salgada	
São José da Tapera	Quixabeira	
São José da Tapera	Laginha	
São José da Tapera	Macena	
São José da Tapera	Riacho Grande	
São José da Tapera	Rua Nova	
São José da Tapera	Brejinho	
Carneiros	Altos dos Paulos	
Carneiros	Olho d'Água da Cruz	
Carneiros	Lagoa do Algodão	
Carneiros	Furnas	
Carneiros	Alto da Ema	
Senador Rui Palmeira	Umbuzeiro Doce	
Senador Rui Palmeira	Serrotinho	
Senador Rui Palmeira	Calango Verde	
Senador Rui Palmeira	Serrinha	
Senador Rui Palmeira	Barriguda	
Senador Rui Palmeira	Candunda	
Senador Rui Palmeira	Barra da Talhada	
Senador Rui Palmeira	Barro Branco	
Dois Riachos	Cajueiro	
Dois Riachos	Araçá	
Dois Riachos	Jacaré	
Dois Riachos	Serra da Mandioca	
Dois Riachos	Pai Mané	
Dois Riachos	Fazenda de Baixo	
Santana do Ipanema	Olho d'Água do Amaro	
Santana do Ipanema	Serrote dos Bois	
Santana do Ipanema	São Bartolomeu	
Santana do Ipanema	Barra do João Gomes	
Santana do Ipanema	Barriguda	
Santana do Ipanema	Queimada do Rio	
Santana do Ipanema	Poço da Pedra	
Santana do Ipanema	Serra da Lagoa	
Santana do Ipanema	Samambaia	
Santana do Ipanema	Baixo do Tamanduá	
Santana do Ipanema	Remetedeira	
Santana do Ipanema	Serra Aguda	
Santana do Ipanema	Curral do Meio	
Santana do Ipanema	Baixio	
Santana do Ipanema	Timbaúba	
Santana do Ipanema	Serra do Macaco	
Santana do Ipanema	Areia Branca	
Santana do Ipanema	Água Fria	
Santana do Ipanema	Barroso	
Santana do Ipanema	Barra do Tigre	
Santana do Ipanema	Grota	
Santana do Ipanema	Camoxinga dos Teodosios	
Santana do Ipanema	São Félix	
Santana do Ipanema	Óleo	
Santana do Ipanema	Olho d'Água Grande	
Santana do Ipanema	Caracol	
Santana do Ipanema	Serra do Jardim	
Santana do Ipanema	São Raimundo	
Santana do Ipanema	Serra dos Meninos	
Poço das Trincheiras	Jacu	
Poço das Trincheiras	Mocó	
Poço das Trincheiras	Lagoa Bonita	
Poço das Trincheiras	Pedra d'Água dos Alexandres	
Poço das Trincheiras	Tapuiu	
Poço das Trincheiras	Alto do Tamanduá	
Poço das Trincheiras	Jorge	
Poço das Trincheiras	Santa Vitória	
Poço das Trincheiras	Moita dos Pulcas	
Poço das Trincheiras	Saco do Ramalho	
Poço das Trincheiras	Caiçara	
Poço das Trincheiras	Barro Vermelho	
Poço das Trincheiras	Camoxinga	
Poço das Trincheiras	Pilãozeiro	
Poço das Trincheiras	Patos	
Poço das Trincheiras	Pedra da Bola	
Poço das Trincheiras	Quandú	
Poço das Trincheiras	Manuê	
Poço das Trincheiras	Gravatazinho	
Poço das Trincheiras	Pastor Poço	
Poço das Trincheiras	Barra da Tapera	
Maravilha	São Cristóvão	
Maravilha	Riacho dos Porcos	
Maravilha	Cedro	
Maravilha	Olho d'Água do Negro	
Maravilha	São Luiz	
Maravilha	Capiá	
Maravilha	Tigre	
Maravilha	Lagoa do Touro	
Maravilha	Lagoa do Tenente	
Ouro Branco	Várzea do Marinho	
Ouro Branco	Serrotinho	

== Sertão Alagoano ==
=== Sertão do São Francisco Microregion ===
Municipality	Village	Population (2022)
Piranhas	Entremontes	
Piranhas	Olho d'Água do Meio	
Piranhas	Boa Vista	
Piranhas	Baixa da Légua	
Piranhas	Lagoa da Cachoeira	
Piranhas	Dois Irmãos	
Piranhas	Piau	
Piranhas	Lages	
Piranhas	Lagoa Comprida	
Piranhas	Antônio Conselheiro	
Piranhas	Margarida Alves	
Piranhas	Lagoa Nova	
Olho d'Água do Casado	Chico Mendes	
Olho d'Água do Casado	Patativa do Assaré	
Olho d'Água do Casado	Riacho Salgado	
Olho d'Água do Casado	Banco da Terra	
Olho d'Água do Casado	Tourinhos	
Olho d'Água do Casado	Nova Esperança	
Olho d'Água do Casado	São Francisco	
Olho d'Água do Casado	Mundo Novo	
Olho d'Água do Casado	Itatiaia	
Olho d'Água do Casado	Morro Vermelho	
Olho d'Água do Casado	Poço Salgado	
Delmiro Gouveia	Jurema	
Delmiro Gouveia	Lameirão	
Delmiro Gouveia	Malhada	
Delmiro Gouveia	Xingózinho	
Delmiro Gouveia	Volta	
Delmiro Gouveia	Jardim Cordeiro	
Delmiro Gouveia	Cruz	
Delmiro Gouveia	Rebeca	
Delmiro Gouveia	Salgado	
Delmiro Gouveia	Lagoinha	
Delmiro Gouveia	Peba	
Delmiro Gouveia	Pedrão	
Delmiro Gouveia	Quarenta e Quatro	
Delmiro Gouveia	Maria Bonita	
Delmiro Gouveia	Barragem Leste	
Delmiro Gouveia	Moxotó	
Delmiro Gouveia	Valha-me Deus	
Delmiro Gouveia	Maria Cristina	
Delmiro Gouveia	Caraíbas do Lino	
Delmiro Gouveia	Boa Vista	
Delmiro Gouveia	Alto Bonito	
Delmiro Gouveia	Morros	
Delmiro Gouveia	Serra Negra	
Delmiro Gouveia	Porto da Barra	
Delmiro Gouveia	São Sebastião	
Delmiro Gouveia	Juá	
Delmiro Gouveia	Sinimbú	
Delmiro Gouveia	Canafístula	
Delmiro Gouveia	Gangorra	

=== Serrana do Sertão Microregion ===
Municipality	Village	Population (2022)
Pariconha	Rolas	
Pariconha	Mosquita	
Pariconha	Corredores	
Pariconha	Maria Bode	
Pariconha	Tanque	
Pariconha	Campinhos	
Pariconha	Karuazu	
Pariconha	Verdão	
Pariconha	Lagoa Preta	
Pariconha	Burnil	
Pariconha	Corredores de Baixo	
Pariconha	Caraibeiras dos Teodósios	
Pariconha	Figueiredo	
Pariconha	Araticum	
Pariconha	Capim	
Pariconha	Serra do Engenho	
Pariconha	Serra dos Vitórios	
Pariconha	Jurema	
Pariconha	Serra Baixa Verde	
Pariconha	Altos das Mangueiras	
Pariconha	Poço da Areia	
Pariconha	Geripancó	
Pariconha	Tabuleiro	
Pariconha	Malhada Vermelha	
Pariconha	Vieira	
Água Branca	Turcos	
Água Branca	Lagoa do Caminho	
Água Branca	Tinguí	
Água Branca	Alto dos Coelhos	
Água Branca	Tabuleiro	
Água Branca	Lagoa das Pedras	
Água Branca	Cal	
Água Branca	Urubu	
Água Branca	Tabela	
Água Branca	Papa Terra	
Água Branca	Várzea do Pico	
Água Branca	Cobra	
Água Branca	Boqueirão	
Água Branca	Barro Preto	
Água Branca	Malhada das Pedras	
Água Branca	Navio	
Água Branca	Moreira de Baixo	
Água Branca	Saco dos Pambus	
Água Branca	Chupete	
Água Branca	Serra do Estreito	
Água Branca	Queimadas	
Água Branca	Croatá	
Água Branca	Campo Verde	
Água Branca	Serra do Sítio	
Água Branca	Onça	
Água Branca	Três Pedras	
Água Branca	Olaria	
Água Branca	Serra das Viúvas	
Água Branca	Ouricuri	
Água Branca	Baixa do Pico	
Água Branca	Alto da Boa Vista	
Água Branca	Preguiçoso	
Água Branca	Serra do Luca	
Água Branca	Casa Nova	
Água Branca	Serra do Cavalo	
Água Branca	Serra do Meio	
Água Branca	Umbuzeiro	
Água Branca	Santa Teresinha	
Água Branca	Pipoca	
Água Branca	Maxi	
Água Branca	Logrador	
Água Branca	Quixabeira	
Água Branca	Januária Kalankó	
Água Branca	Gregório	
Água Branca	Salgadinho	
Inhapi	Riacho do Serrote	
Inhapi	Delmiro Gouveia	
Inhapi	Cansanção	
Inhapi	Gravatá	
Inhapi	Baixa do Mel	
Inhapi	Balde	
Inhapi	Serrote dos Flores	
Inhapi	Baixa Fresca	
Inhapi	Serrotinho	
Inhapi	Leobino	
Inhapi	Roçado	
Inhapi	Aguada	
Inhapi	Chã	
Inhapi	Serra do Grude	
Inhapi	Promissão	
Canapi	Capiá dos Dores	
Canapi	Carié	
Canapi	Tupete	
Canapi	Mudubim	
Canapi	Queimada dos Birotas	
Canapi	Lagoa da Samambaia	
Canapi	Capiá da Igrejinha	
Canapi	Serrote Velho	
Canapi	Riacho do Olho d'Água	
Canapi	Santa Cruz do Barro Branco	
Canapi	Fumaça	
Canapi	Cachoeira Grande	
Canapi	Iraque	
Canapi	Várzea da Palha	
Canapi	Alto das Negras	
Canapi	Forquilha	
Canapi	Albino	
Canapi	Riacho do Mauricio	
Mata Grande	Caraíbas	
Mata Grande	Barriguda	
Mata Grande	Santa Cruz do Deserto	
Mata Grande	Terra Nova	
Mata Grande	Lama	
Mata Grande	Baixa do Galo	
Mata Grande	Barreiras	
Mata Grande	Lamarão	
Mata Grande	Buenos Aires	
Mata Grande	Urubu	
Mata Grande	Olho d'Água do Seco	
Mata Grande	Benta	
Mata Grande	Saco dos Mirandas	
Mata Grande	Arapuã	
Mata Grande	Surubim	
Mata Grande	Caldeirão	
Mata Grande	Bravo	
Mata Grande	Engenho	
Mata Grande	Serra da Onça	
Mata Grande	Angico	
Mata Grande	Lagoa de Santa Cruz	
Mata Grande	Boa Sombra	
Mata Grande	Santa Luzia	
Mata Grande	Sabonete	
Mata Grande	Pedra Miúda	
Mata Grande	Santa Rosa	
Mata Grande	União	
Mata Grande	Salgado do Lino	
Mata Grande	Morro Vermelho	
Mata Grande	Xexéu	
Mata Grande	Ouricuri	
Mata Grande	Pau-Ferro Velho	
Mata Grande	Serrinha	
Mata Grande	Lagoinha	
Mata Grande	Poço Branco	
Mata Grande	Faveiras	
Mata Grande	Poço Dantas	

== See also ==
- Alagoas
- List of municipalities in Alagoas
- Quilombos
