= Penedo =

Penedo may refer to:

- Penedo, Alagoas, a municipality in the state of Alagoas, Brazil
- Penedo, Itatiaia, a district in the Itatiaia municipality, Rio de Janeiro state, Brazil
