= Anadia, Alagoas =

Municipality of Alagoas, Brazil

Anadia
- Municipality
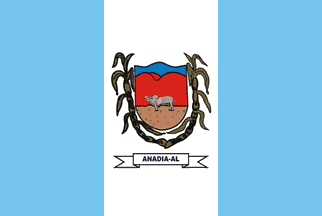
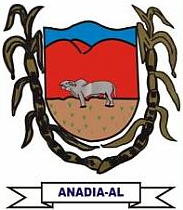
- Flag Coat of arms

- Location in Brazil
- Coordinates: 9°41′4″S 36°18′15″W
- Country: Brazil
- State: Alagoas
- Established: 18 July 1895

Government
  - Mayor: José Augusto Rocha Souza (Progressistas)

Area
  - Total: 73.155 sq mi (189.471 km^{2})
- Elevation: 502 ft (153 m)

Population (2020)
  - Total: 17,526
- Time zone: UTC−3 (BRT)

Anadia (Central northeastern portuguese pronunciation: [ɐnɐˈdjɐ]) is a municipality located in the state of Alagoas. Its population is 17,526 (2020) and its area is 189 km^{2} (73 sq mi).
