= Minador do Negrão =

Municipality of Alagoas, Brazil

Coordinates: 09°18′18″S 36°51′54″W

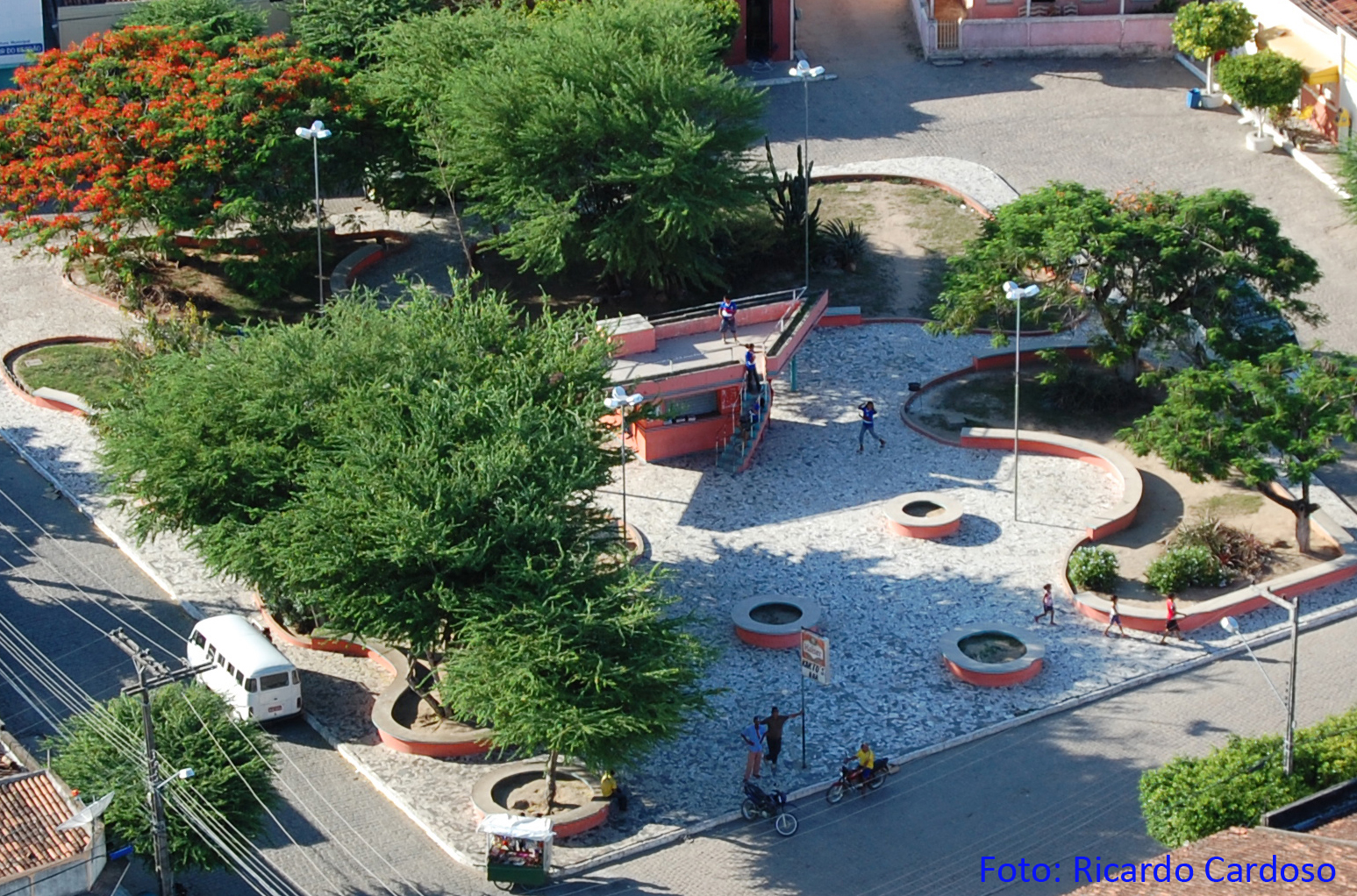

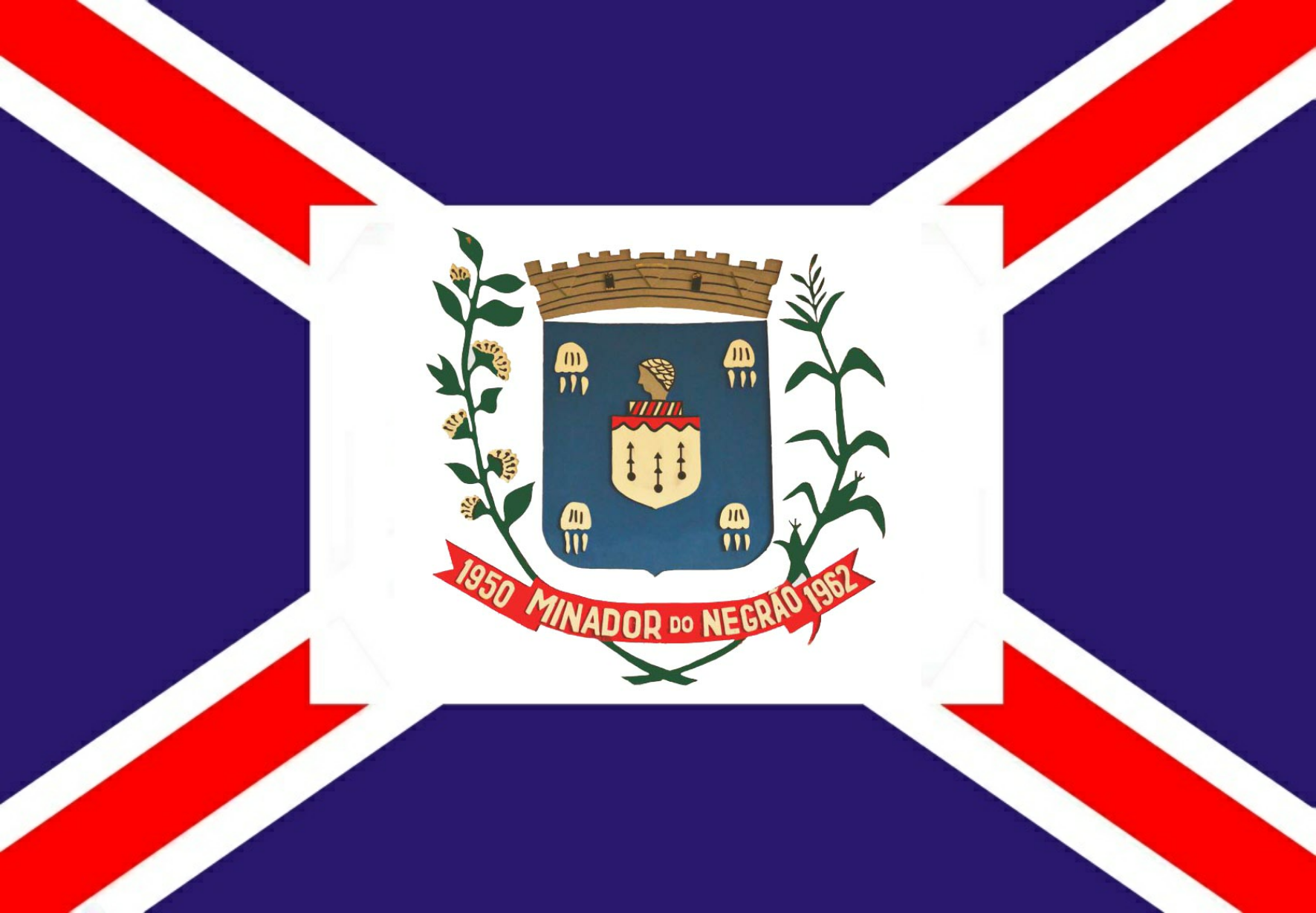
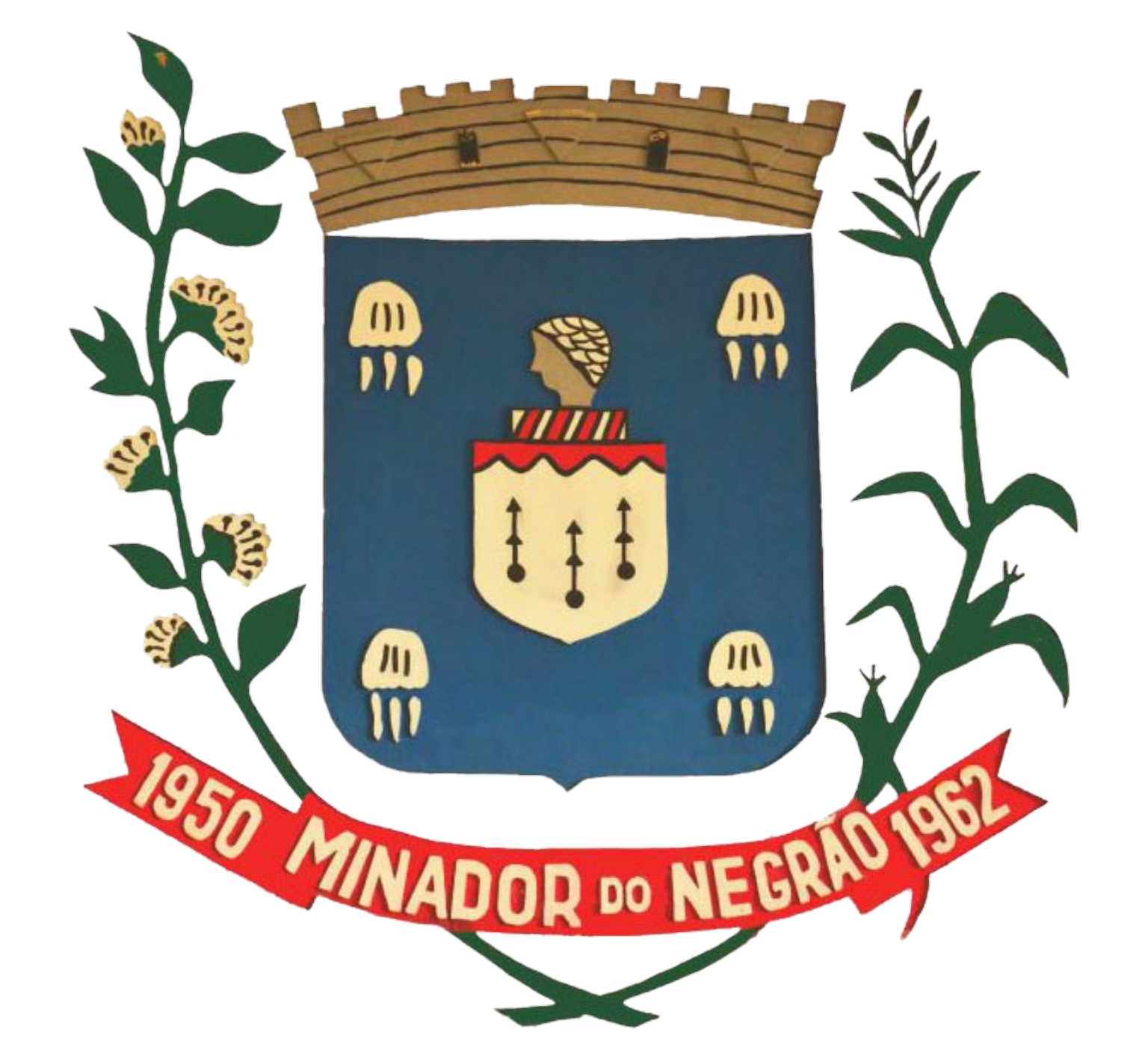
- Flag Coat of arms

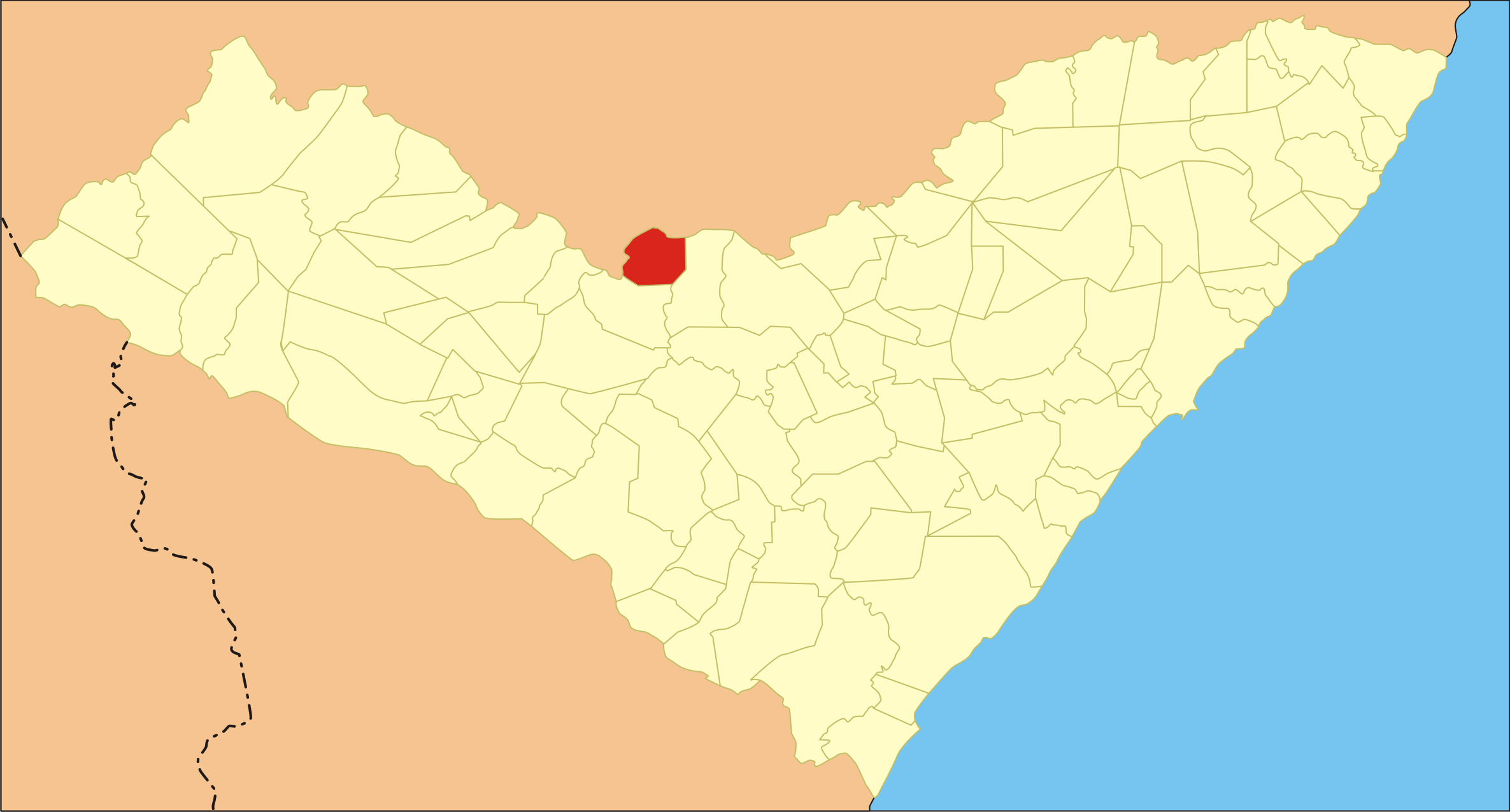
- Established: 27 August 1962

Area
  - Total: 164.476 km^{2} (63.505 sq mi)

Population
  - Total: 5,322
  - Density: 32.36/km^{2} (83.81/sq mi)

Minador do Negrão (Central northeastern portuguese pronunciation: [minɐˈdo ˈdʊ neˈɡɐ̃w]) is a municipality located in the Brazilian state of Alagoas. Its population is 5,322 (2020) and its area is 167 km^{2} (64 sq mi).

== See also ==
- List of municipalities in Alagoas
