= Mata Grande =

Municipality in Alagoas, Brazil

- Municipality
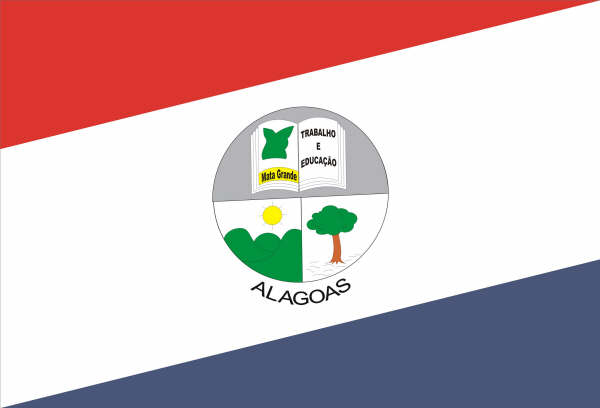
- Flag

- Location of Mata Grande in the State of Alagoas

- Location in Brazil
- Coordinates: 09°07′04″S 37°44′02″W
- Country: Brazil

Population (2020)
  - Total: 25,207
- Time zone: UTC−3 (BRT)
- Website: Official website (on 2012-11-26 the official website address above is not a functioning website address) www.matagrande.al.cnm.org.br (on 2012-11-26 the unofficial website address above appears to be functioning as a website for the municipality)

Mata Grande (Central northeastern portuguese pronunciation: [ˈmata ˈɡɾɐ̃di]) is a municipality located at the north-western corner of the Brazilian state of Alagoas.

Its population is 25,207 (2020) and its area is 908 km².

== See also ==
- List of municipalities in Alagoas
