= Jaramataia =

Municipality in Alagoas, Brazil

- Municipality of Alagoas, Brazil
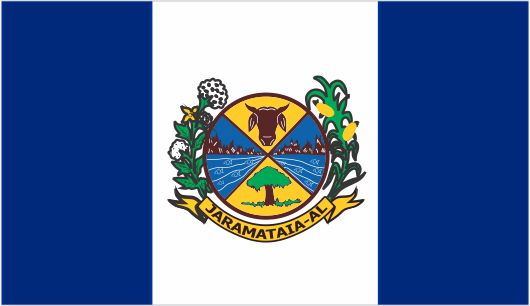
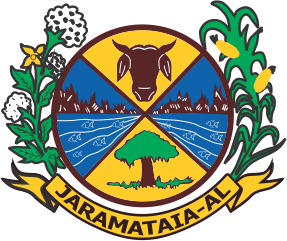
- Flag Coat of arms
- Etymology: Named after the jaramataia tree, which was abundant in the area
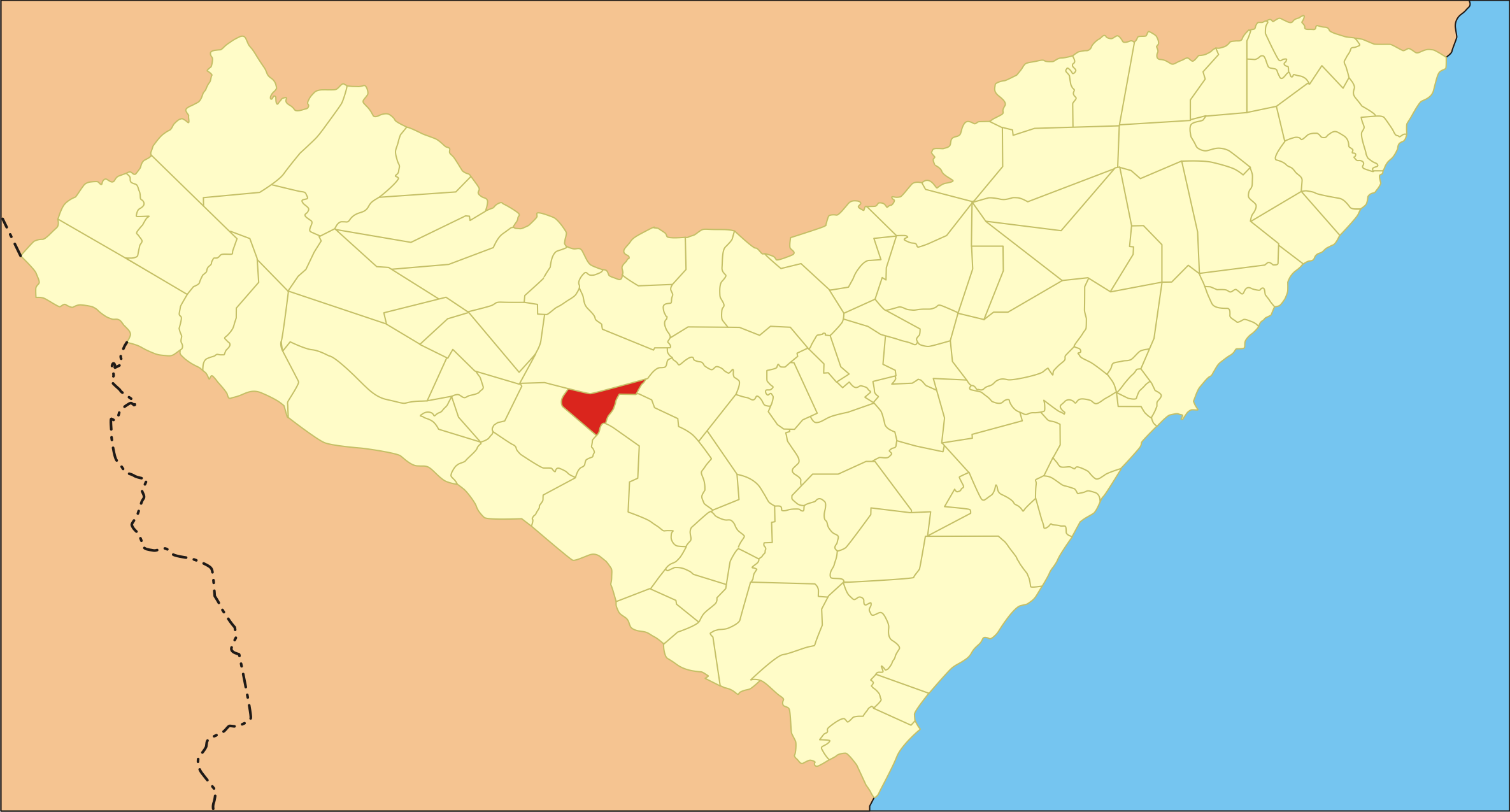
- Location of Jaramataia in Alagoas

- Location within Brazil Location within South America
- Coordinates: 9°39′32″S 37°0′7″W
- Country: Brazil
- Region: Northeast
- State: Alagoas
- Founded: 17 May 1962

Government
  - Mayor: Ricardo Martins Barbosa (MDB) (2025-2028)
  - Vice Mayor: José Eliomar Barbosa (PSD) (2025-2028)

Area
  - Total: 105.416 km^{2} (40.701 sq mi)
- Elevation: 164 m (538 ft)

Population (2022)
  - Total: 4,985
  - Density: 47.29/km^{2} (122.5/sq mi)
- Demonym: Jaramataiense (Brazilian Portuguese)
- Time zone: UTC-03:00 (Brasília Time)
- Postal code: 57425-000
- HDI (2010): 0.552 – medium
- Website: jaramataia.al.gov.br

Jaramataia (Central northeastern portuguese pronunciation: [ʒarɐmɐˈtɐjɐ]) is a municipality located in the Brazilian state of Alagoas. Its population is 5,761 (2020) and its area is 104 km^{2} (40 sq mi).

== See also ==
- List of municipalities in Alagoas
