= Olivença, Alagoas =

Municipality in Alagoas, Brazil

Coordinates: 09°31′07″S 37°11′26″W

Olivença
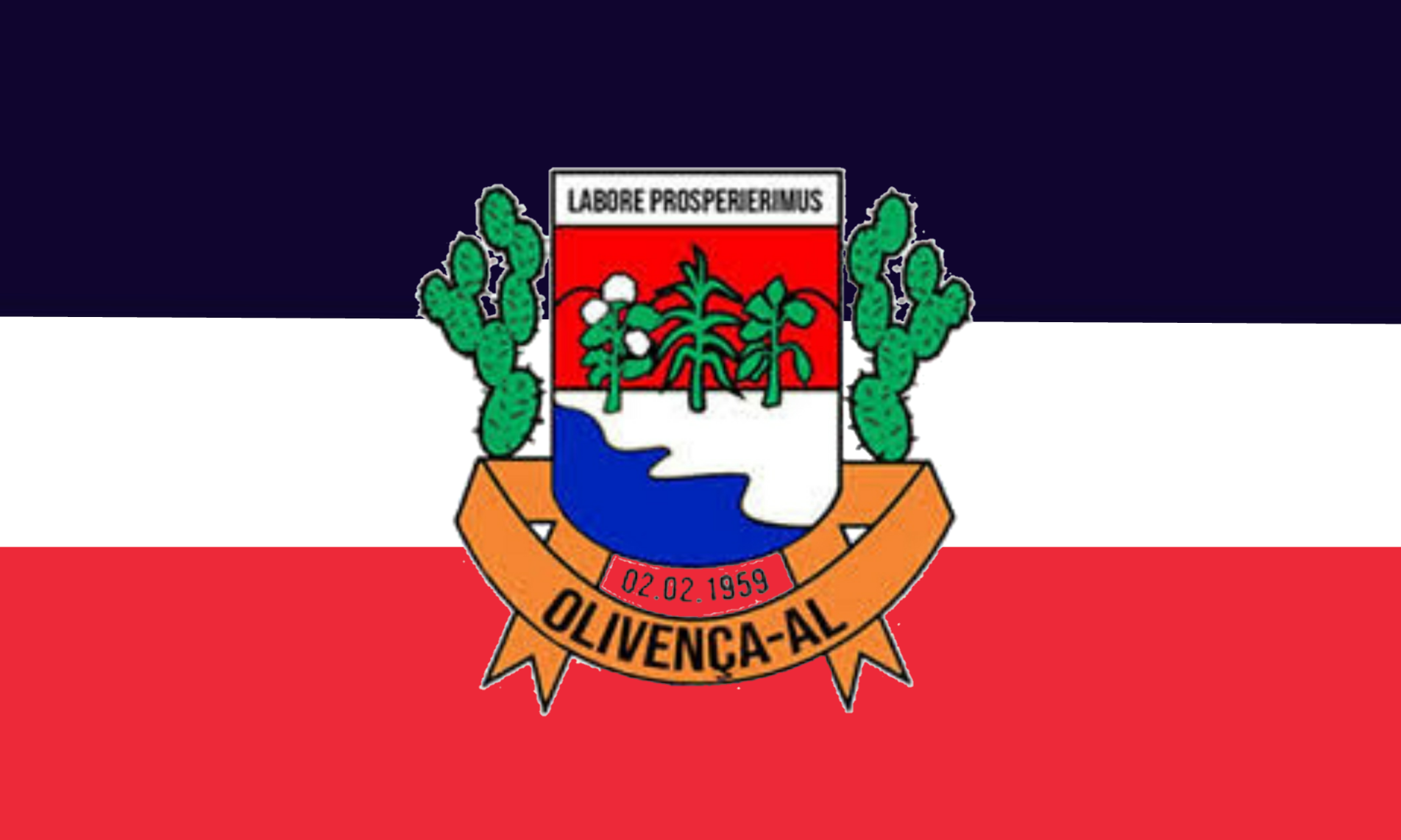
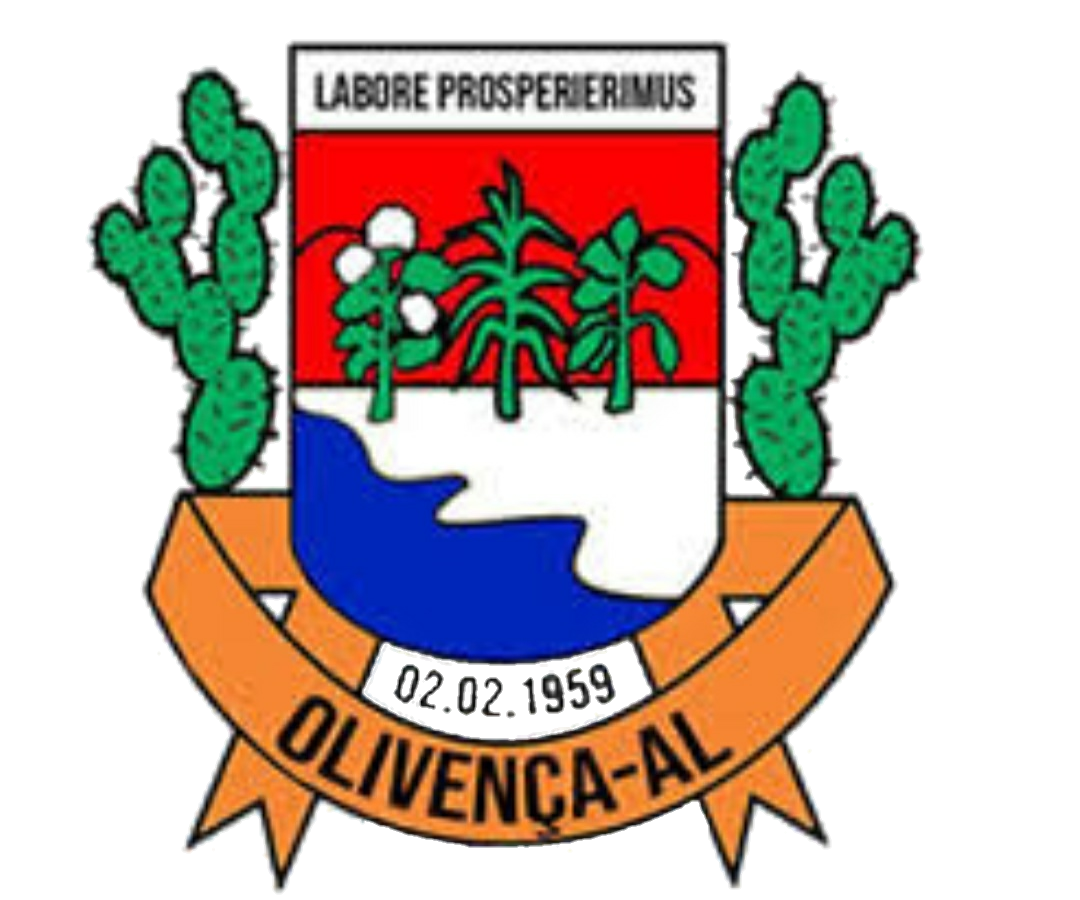
- Flag Coat of arms

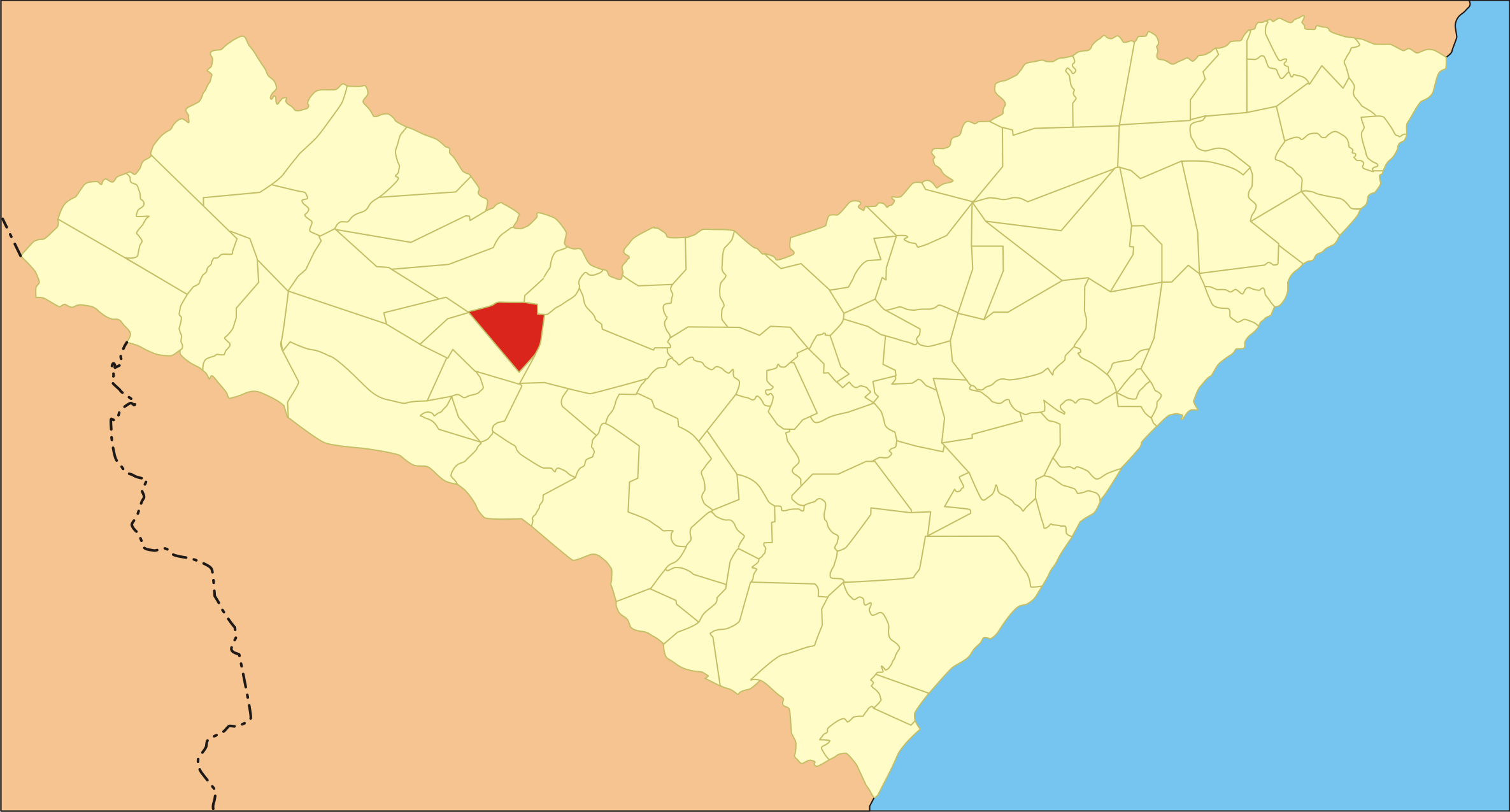
- Established: 2 February 1959

Area
  - Total: 172.957 km^{2} (66.779 sq mi)

Population
  - Total: 11,657
  - Density: 67.398/km^{2} (174.56/sq mi)

Olivença (Central northeastern portuguese pronunciation: [oliˈvẽsɐ]) is a municipality located in the western of the Brazilian state of Alagoas. Its population is 11,657 (2020) and its area is 173 km^{2} (67 sq mi).

== See also ==
- List of municipalities in Alagoas
