= Senador Rui Palmeira =

Municipality in Alagoas, Brazil

- Municipality of Alagoas, Brazil
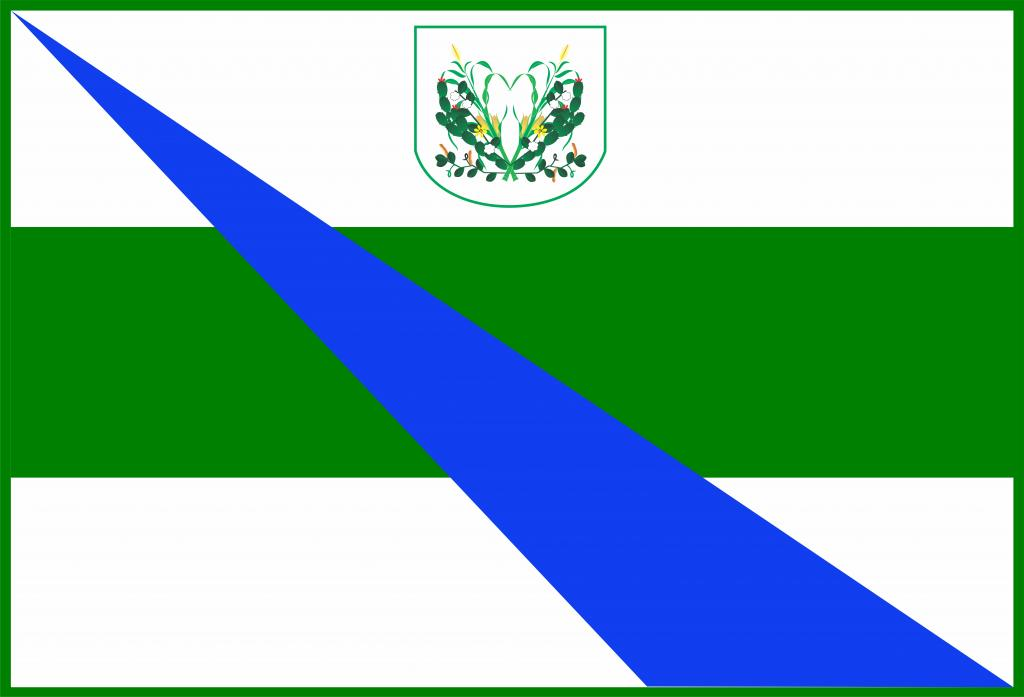
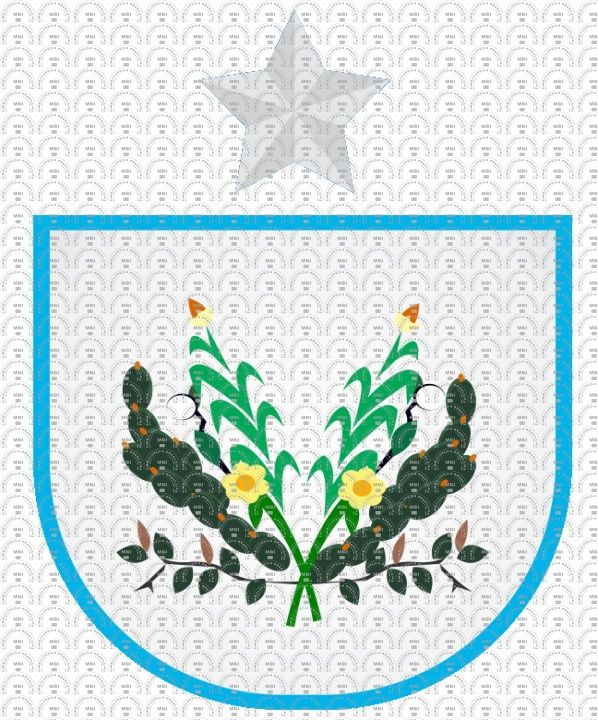
- Flag Coat of arms
- Etymology: Named after Rui Soares Palmeira, federal senator representing Alagoas from 1955 to 1968
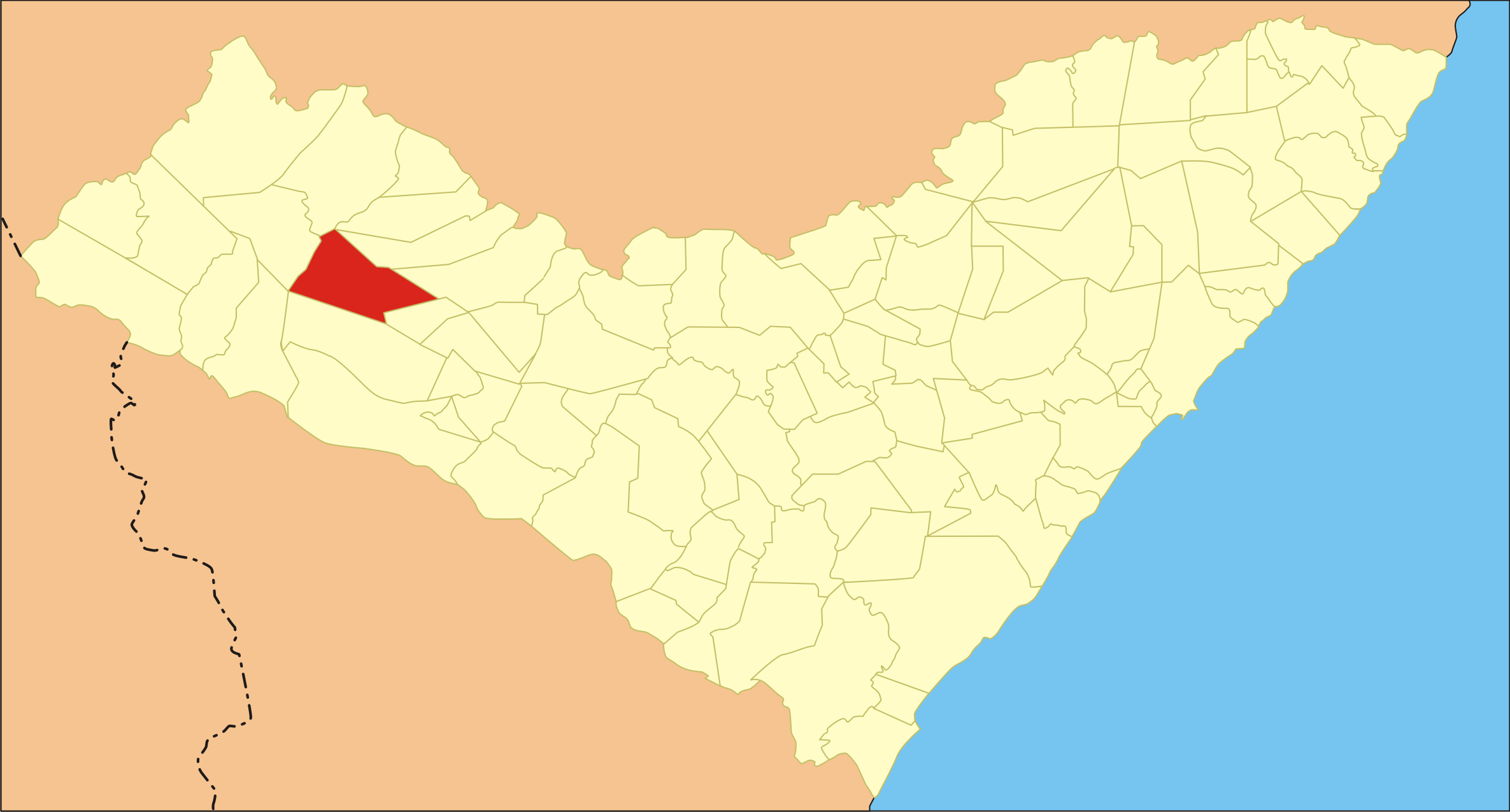
- Location of Senador Rui Palmeira in Alagoas

- Location within Brazil Location within South America
- Coordinates: 09°28′0″S 37°27′20″W
- Country: Brazil
- Region: Northeast
- State: Alagoas
- Founded: 13 May 1982

Government
  - Mayor: João Carlos Rodrigues (MDB) (2025-2028)
  - Vice Mayor: Allysson Feitosa da Silva (MDB) (2025-2028)

Area
  - Total: 338.569 km^{2} (130.722 sq mi)
- Elevation: 360 m (1,180 ft)

Population (2022)
  - Total: 12,303
  - Density: 36.34/km^{2} (94.1/sq mi)
- Demonym: Rui-palmeirense (Brazilian Portuguese)
- Time zone: UTC-03:00 (Brasília Time)
- Postal code: 57515-000
- HDI (2010): 0.518 – low
- Website: senadorruipalmeira.al.gov.br

Senador Rui Palmeira (Central northeastern portuguese pronunciation: [sẽnaˈdo ˈhuj pawˈmeɾɐ]) is a municipality located in the western of the Brazilian state of Alagoas. Its population was 13,921 (2020) and its area is 360 km^{2} (140 sq mi).

== See also ==
- List of municipalities in Alagoas
