= Inhapi =

Municipality in Alagoas, Brazil

- Municipality
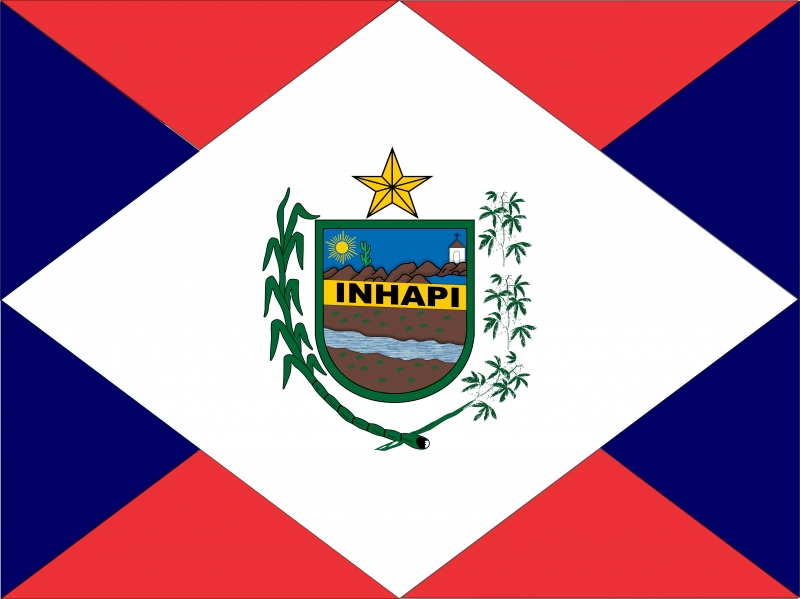
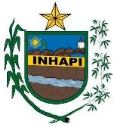
- Flag Coat of arms

- Location within Brazil
- Coordinates: 9°13′22″S 37°44′53″W
- Country: Brazil
- State: Alagoas

Area
  - Total: 374 km^{2} (144 sq mi)

Population (2020)
  - Total: 18,392
  - Density: 49.2/km^{2} (127/sq mi)

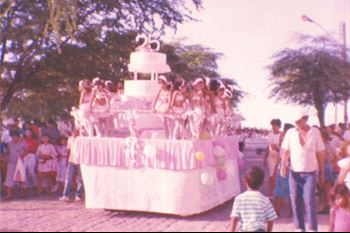
A photo of a Traditional Civic Desfile in Inhapi

Inhapi (Central northeastern portuguese pronunciation: [ĩj̃ɐˈpi]) is a municipality located in the western of the Brazilian state of Alagoas. Its population is 18,392 as of 2020 and its area is 374 km^{2} (144 sq mi).
