= Monteirópolis =

Municipality of Alagoas, Brazil

- Municipality of Alagoas, Brazil
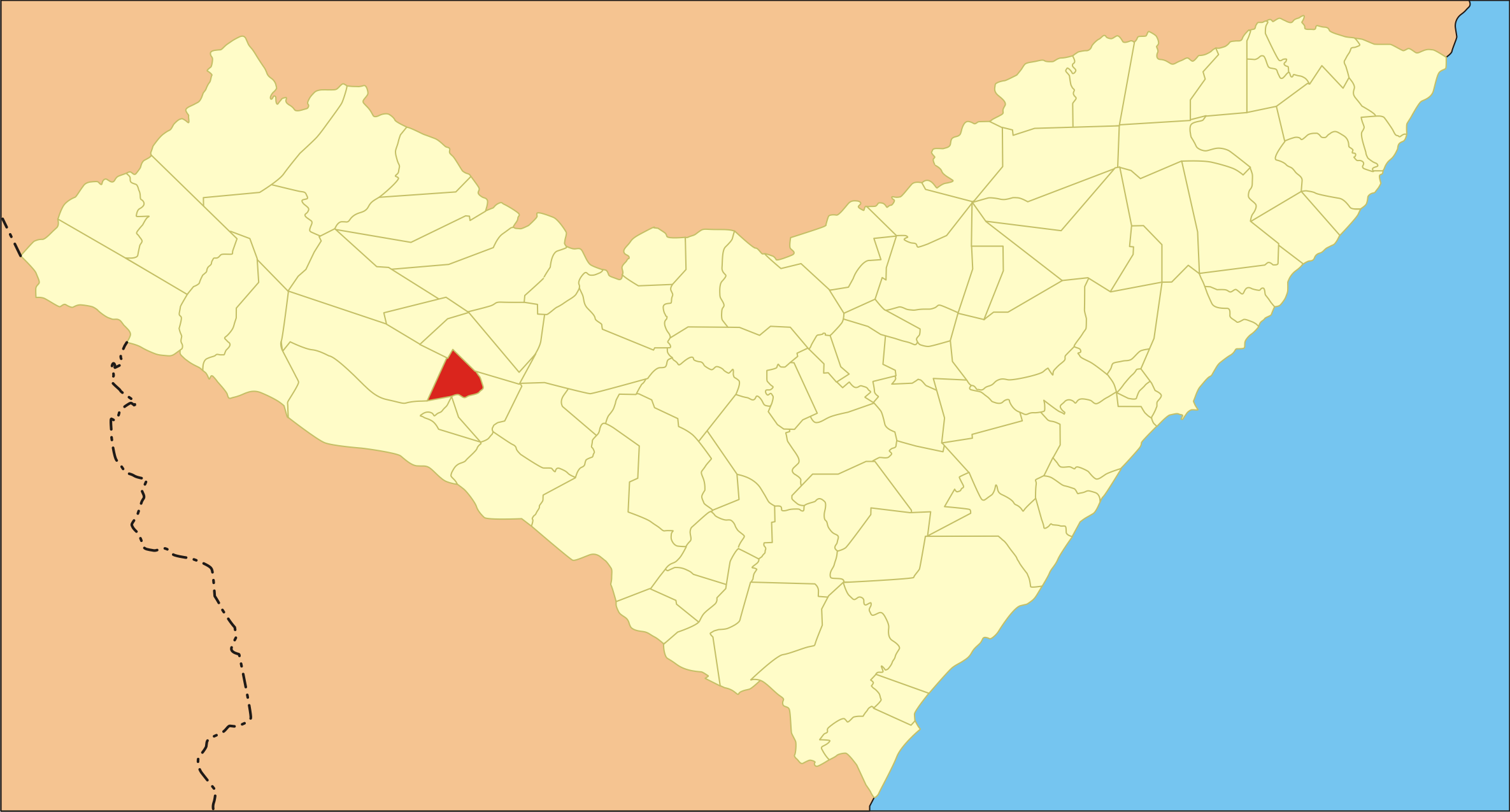
- Location of Monteirópolis in Alagoas

- Location within Brazil Location within South America
- Coordinates: 9°36′10″S 37°14′52″W
- Country: Brazil
- Region: Northeast
- State: Alagoas
- Founded: 15 June 1960

Government
  - Mayor: Leonor Melo Monteiro (MDB) (2025-2028)
  - Vice Mayor: Fabio Marcelo Monteiro Júnior (PDT) (2025-2028)

Area
  - Total: 86.605 km^{2} (33.438 sq mi)
- Elevation: 226 m (741 ft)

Population (2022)
  - Total: 7,184
  - Density: 82.95/km^{2} (214.8/sq mi)
- Demonym: Guaribense (Brazilian Portuguese)
- Time zone: UTC-03:00 (Brasília Time)
- Postal code: 57440-000
- HDI (2010): 0.539 – low
- Website: monteiropolis.al.gov.br

Monteirópolis (Central northeastern portuguese pronunciation: [mõte(j)ˈɾɔpɔlis]) is a municipality located in the Brazilian state of Alagoas. Its population is 7,165 (2020) and its area is 86 km^{2}.

== See also ==
- List of municipalities in Alagoas
