= Cacimbinhas =

Municipality in Alagoas, Brazil

- Municipality of Alagoas, Brazil
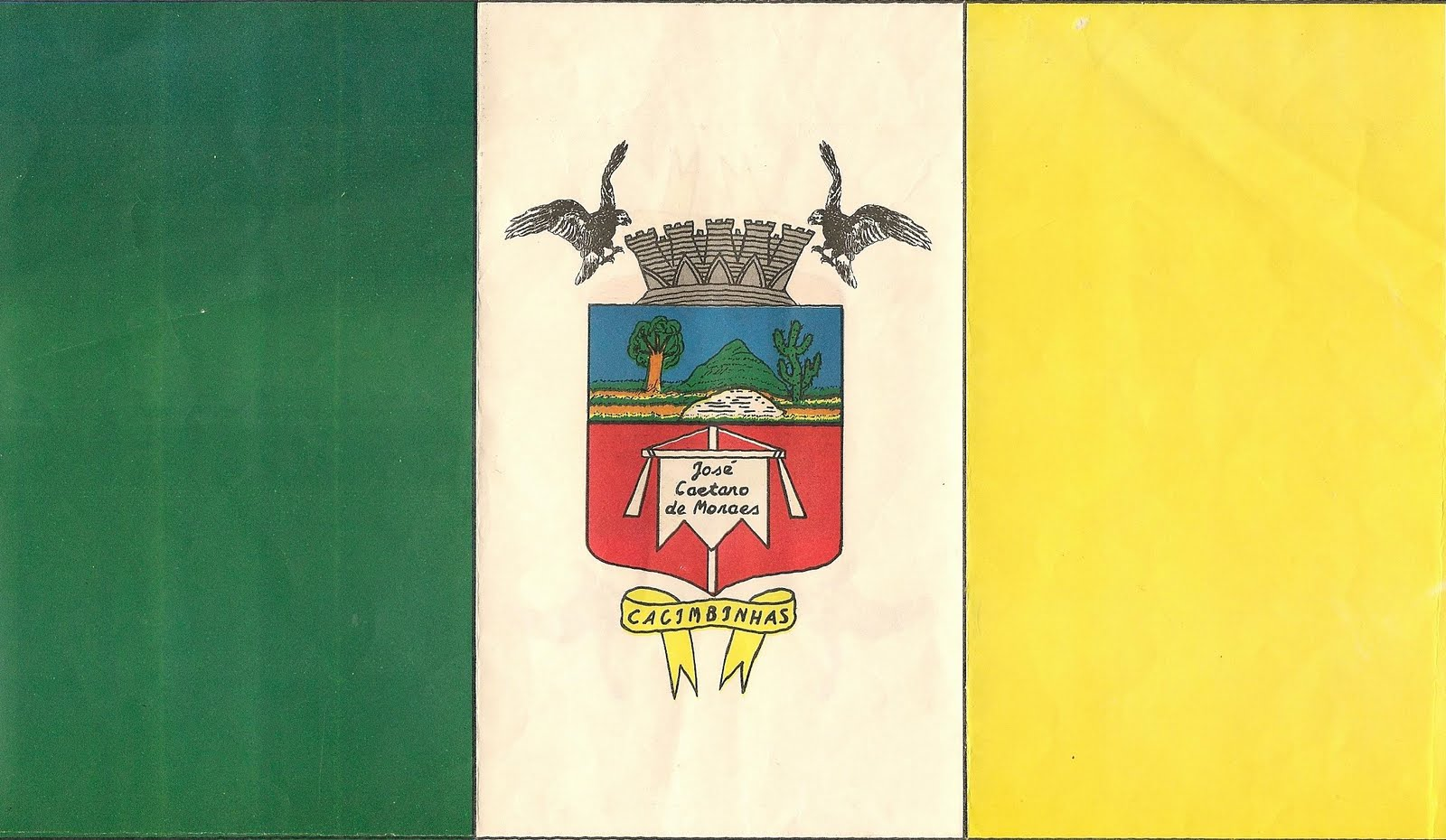
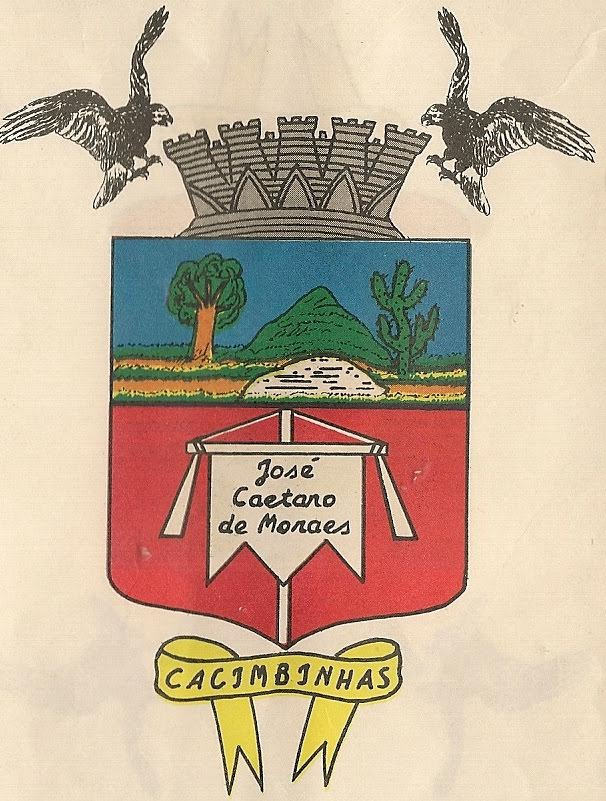
- Flag Coat of arms
- Etymology: Derived from the word cacimba, meaning "well", referring to the numerous wells dug by its settlers
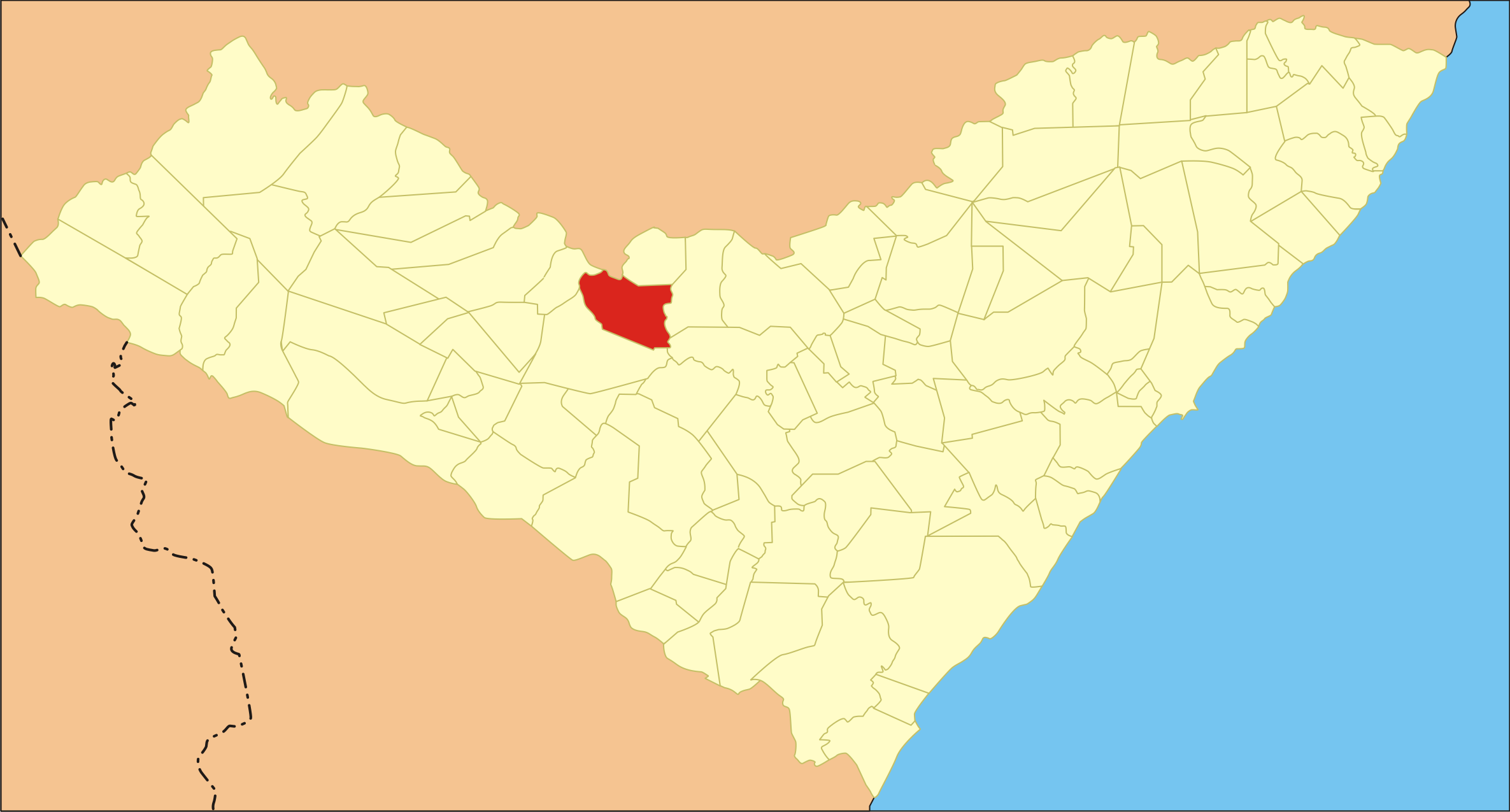
- Location of Cacimbinhas in Alagoas

- Location within Brazil Location within South America
- Coordinates: 9°24′0″S 36°59′24″W
- Country: Brazil
- Region: Northeast
- State: Alagoas
- Founded: 19 September 1958

Government
  - Mayor: Wladimir Araújo Wanderley (MDB) (2025-2028)
  - Vice Mayor: Mirabeau Amorim Madeiros (MDB) (2025-2028)

Area
  - Total: 281.692 km^{2} (108.762 sq mi)
- Elevation: 270 m (890 ft)

Population (2022)
  - Total: 10,482
  - Density: 37.21/km^{2} (96.4/sq mi)
- Demonym: Cacimbinhense (Brazilian Portuguese)
- Time zone: UTC-03:00 (Brasília Time)
- Postal code: 57570-000
- HDI (2010): 0.531 – low
- Website: cacimbinhas.al.gov.br

Cacimbinhas (Central northeastern portuguese pronunciation: [kasĩˈbĩj̃ɐ]) is a municipality in the western of the Brazilian state of Alagoas. Its population is 10,889 (2020) and its area is 273 km^{2}.

== See also ==
- List of municipalities in Alagoas
