= Campo Grande, Alagoas =

Municipality of Alagoas, Brazil

Campo Grande
- Municipality
- Campo Grande
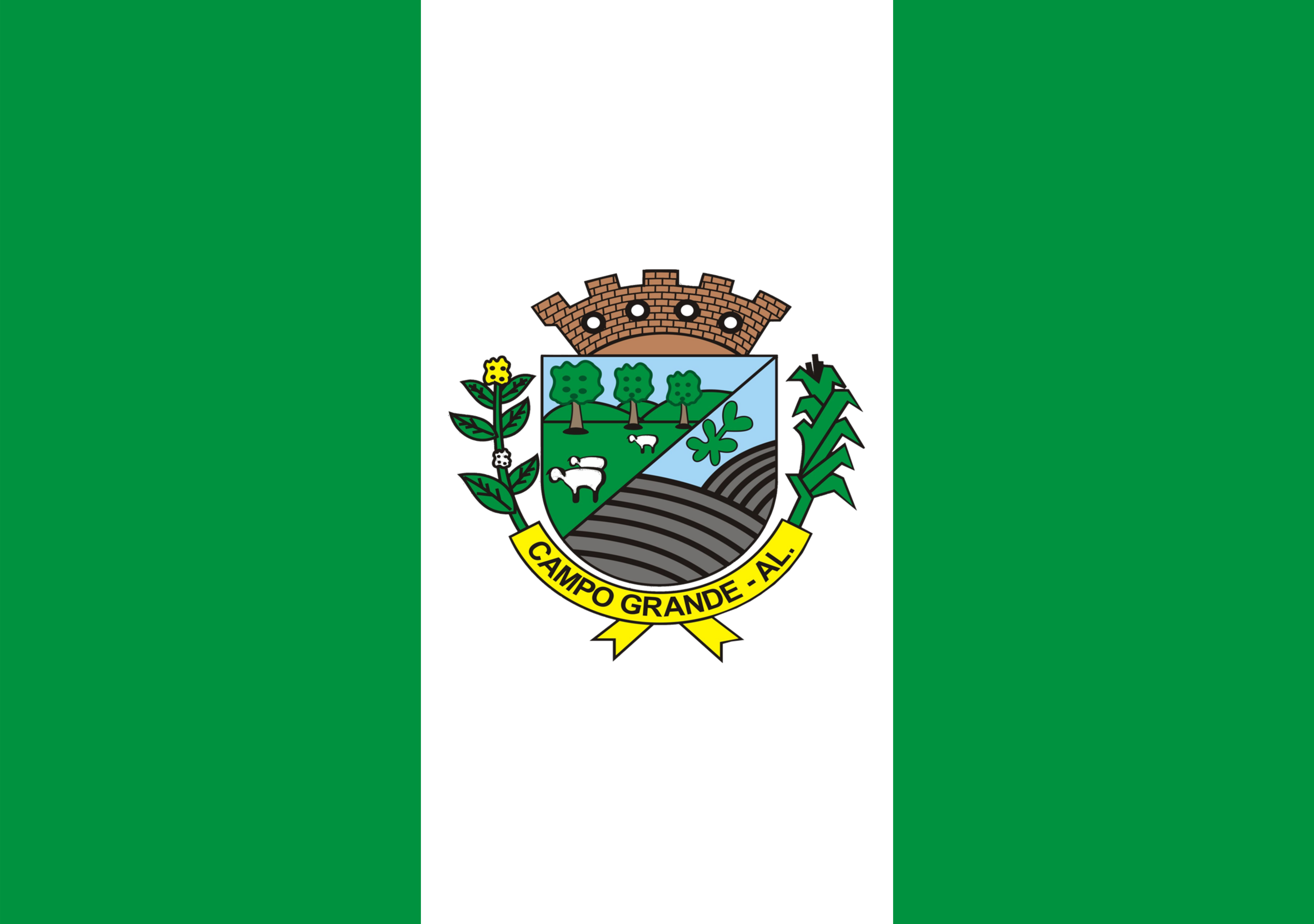
- Flag

- Location within Brazil
- Coordinates: 9°57′28″S 36°47′31″W
- Country: Brazil
- State: Alagoas
- Mesoregion: Agreste Alagoano
- Microregion: Arapiraca
- Founded: November 30, 1961

Government
  - Mayor: Téo Higino

Area
  - Total: 170.144 km^{2} (65.693 sq mi)

Population (2020 est)
  - Total: 9,567
  - Density: 53.98/km^{2} (139.8/sq mi)
- Demonym: Campo-grandense
- Time zone: UTC−3 (BRT)

Campo Grande (Central northeastern portuguese pronunciation: [ˈkɐ̃pu ˈɡɾɐ̃di]) is a municipality located in the Brazilian state of Alagoas. It is situated in the Agreste Alagoano mesoregion and belongs to the Arapiraca microregion.

== History ==
Settlers first arrived in Campo Grande during the 18th century attracted by the farmland of the region. Settlers continued to make communities there, but the town was not officially incorporated until June 27, 1957, when the district was founded. However, it remained a part of the municipality of São Brás until the municipality of Campo Grande was founded on May 31, 1960.

== Geography ==
Campo Grande is located in the state of Alagoas, in the northeastern region of Brazil. It is situated in the Agreste Alagoano, which is known for its diverse flora and fauna. The municipality covers a total area of 170.144 square kilometers.

== Demographics ==
According to the 2021 estimate by the Brazilian Institute of Geography and Statistics (IBGE), Campo Grande has a population of 9,567 residents. The municipality has a population density of 53.98 inhabitants per square kilometer.

== Governance ==
The current mayor of Campo Grande is Téo Higino. He won the election by a margin of 9 votes. The previous Mayor, Arnaldo Higino, received 51.4% of the votes, but was convicted of misconduct and thus Téo Higino was elected mayor.
