= Pindoba =

Municipality in Alagoas, Brazil

- Municipality of Alagoas, Brazil
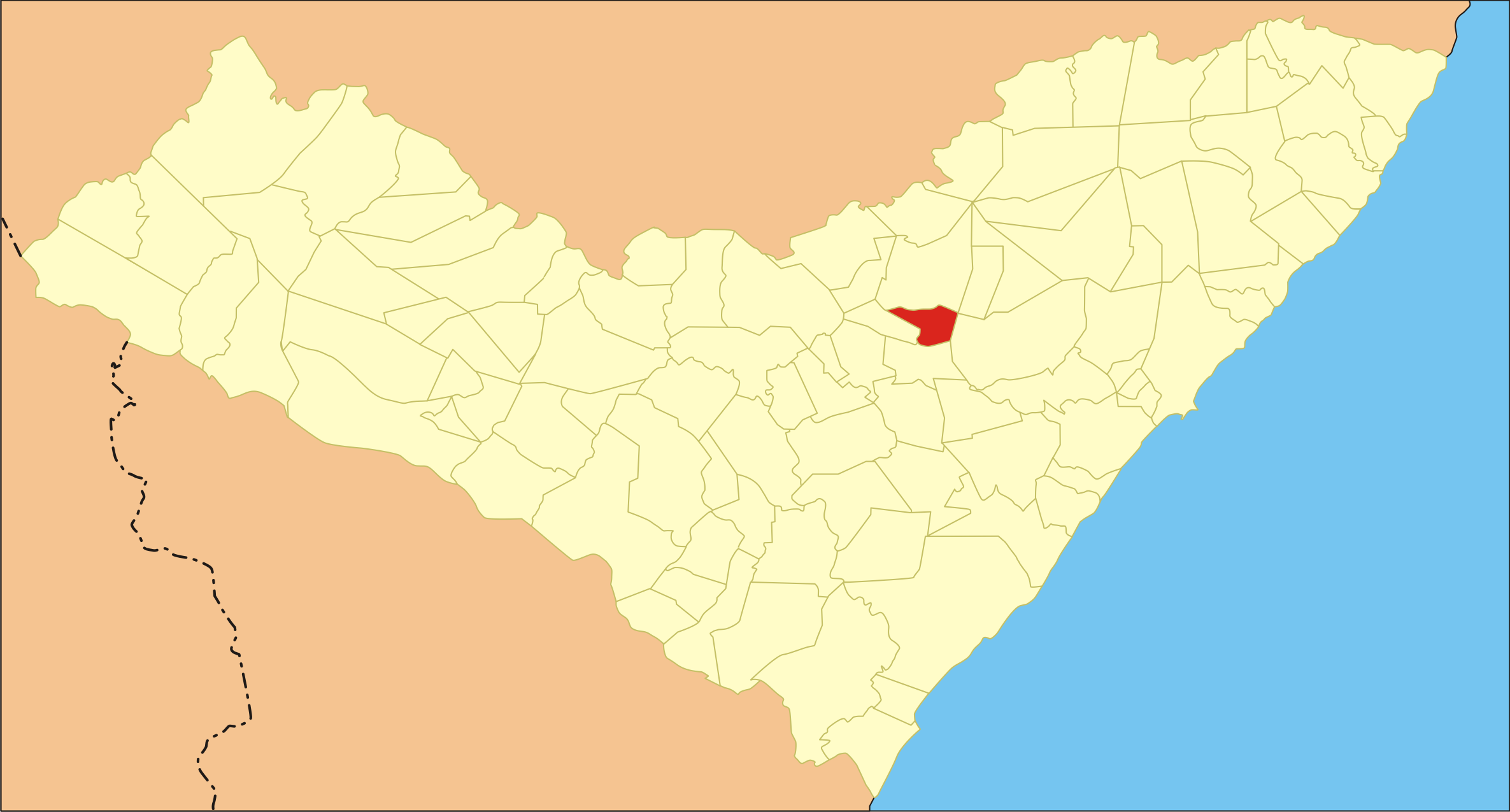
- Location of Pindoba in Alagoas

- Location within Brazil Location within South America
- Coordinates: 9°28′31″S 36°17′17″W
- Country: Brazil
- Region: Northeast
- State: Alagoas
- Founded: 10 October 1957

Government
  - Mayor: José Cicero Cardoso Costa (Republicanos) (2025-2028)
  - Vice Mayor: João Marçal Lopes Beltrão (Republicanos) (2025-2028)

Area
  - Total: 117.085 km^{2} (45.207 sq mi)
- Elevation: 420 m (1,380 ft)

Population (2022)
  - Total: 2,731
  - Density: 23.32/km^{2} (60.4/sq mi)
- Demonym: Pindobense (Brazilian Portuguese)
- Time zone: UTC-03:00 (Brasília Time)
- Postal code: 57720-000
- HDI (2010): 0.574 – medium
- Website: pindoba.al.gov.br

Pindoba (Central northeastern portuguese pronunciation: [pĩˈdɔbɐ]) is a municipality located in the center of the Brazilian state of Alagoas. Its population was 2,905 (2020) and its area is 83 km^{2} (32 sq mi).

== See also ==
- List of municipalities in Alagoas
