= Pariconha =

Municipality in Alagoas, Brazil

- Municipality
- Location of Pariconha in Alagoas, Brazil

- Location in Brazil
- Coordinates: 9.253889°S 38.005833°W
- Founded: 1992

Government
  - Mayor (Prefeito): Antônio Telmo Noia (PP)

Area
  - Total: 260.858 km^{2} (100.718 sq mi)
- Elevation: 350 m (1,150 ft)

Population (2020)
  - Total: 10,539
  - Density: 39.28/km^{2} (101.7/sq mi)
- Demonym: pariconhense
- Time zone: UTC-03:00 (Brasília Time)

Pariconha (Central northeastern portuguese pronunciation: [pɐɾiˈkõɲɐ]) is a municipality located in the western of the Brazilian state of Alagoas. Its population is 10,539 (2020) and its area is 261 km^{2} (101 sq mi).
