= Carneiros =

Municipality in Alagoas, Brazil

- Municipality of Alagoas, Brazil
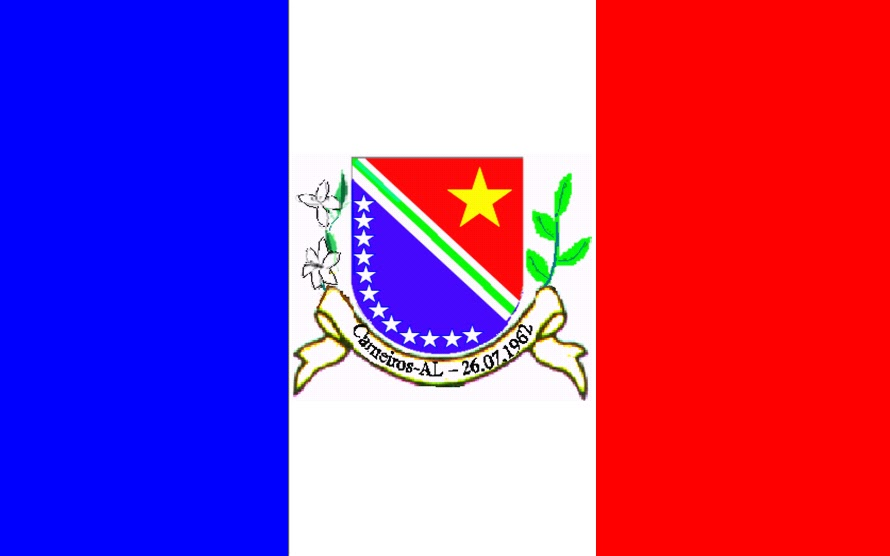
- Flag
- Etymology: In English "Sheep", referring to the story of a well in the area dug by a sheep
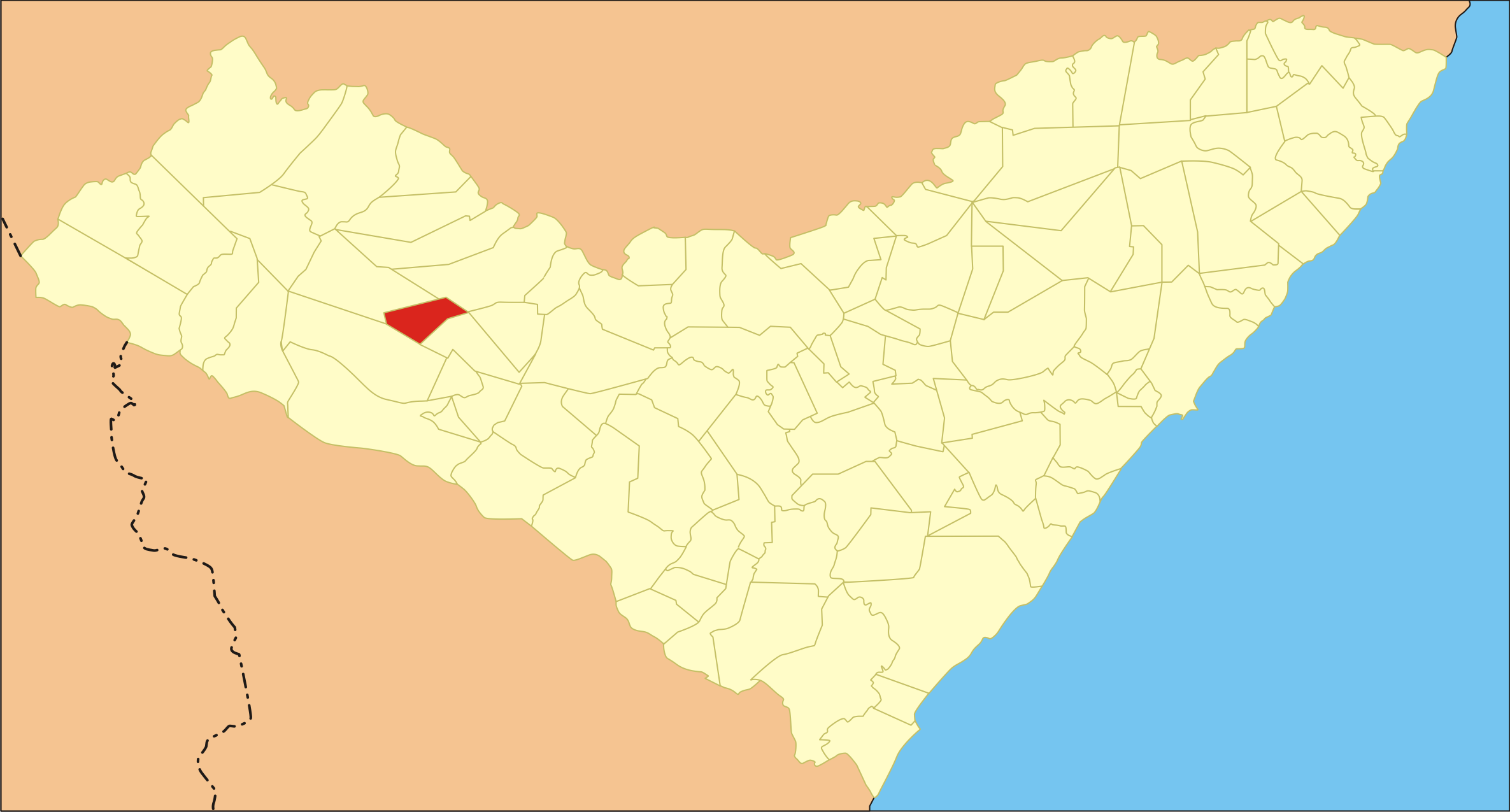
- Location of Carneiros in Alagoas

- Location within Brazil Location within South America
- Coordinates: 9°28′58″S 37°22′37″W
- Country: Brazil
- Region: Northeast
- State: Alagoas
- Founded: 26 July 1962

Government
  - Mayor: Ubiratania Maria Santana (MDB) (2025-2028)
  - Vice Mayor: Janaína Machado (PSB) (2025-2028)

Area
  - Total: 111.695 km^{2} (43.126 sq mi)
- Elevation: 345 m (1,132 ft)

Population (2022)
  - Total: 8,999
  - Density: 80.57/km^{2} (208.7/sq mi)
- Demonym: Carneirense (Brazilian Portuguese)
- Time zone: UTC-03:00 (Brasília Time)
- Postal code: 57535-000
- HDI (2010): 0.526 – low
- Website: carneiros.al.gov.br

Carneiros (Central northeastern portuguese pronunciation: [kɐhˈneɾu]) is a municipality located in the western of the Brazilian state of Alagoas. Its population is 9,159 (2020) and its area is 113 km^{2} (44 sq mi).

== See also ==
- List of municipalities in Alagoas
