= Limoeiro de Anadia =

Municipality in Alagoas, Brazil

- Municipality of Alagoas, Brazil
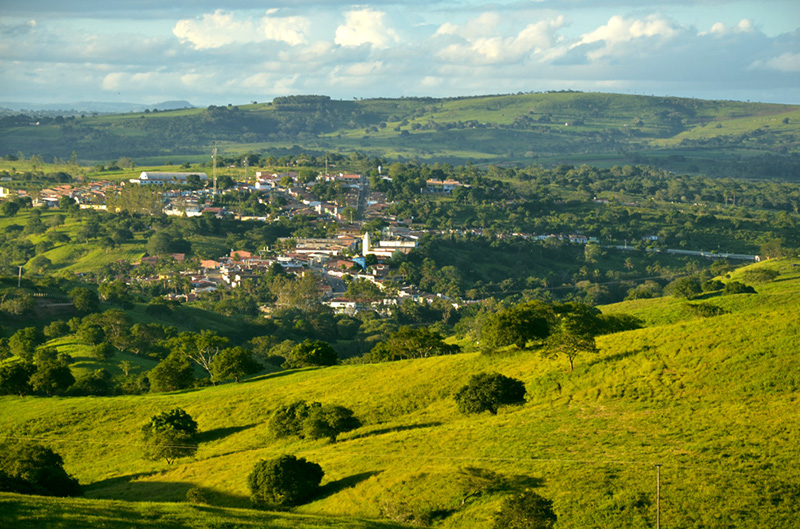
- View of Limoeiro de Anadia

- Coat of arms

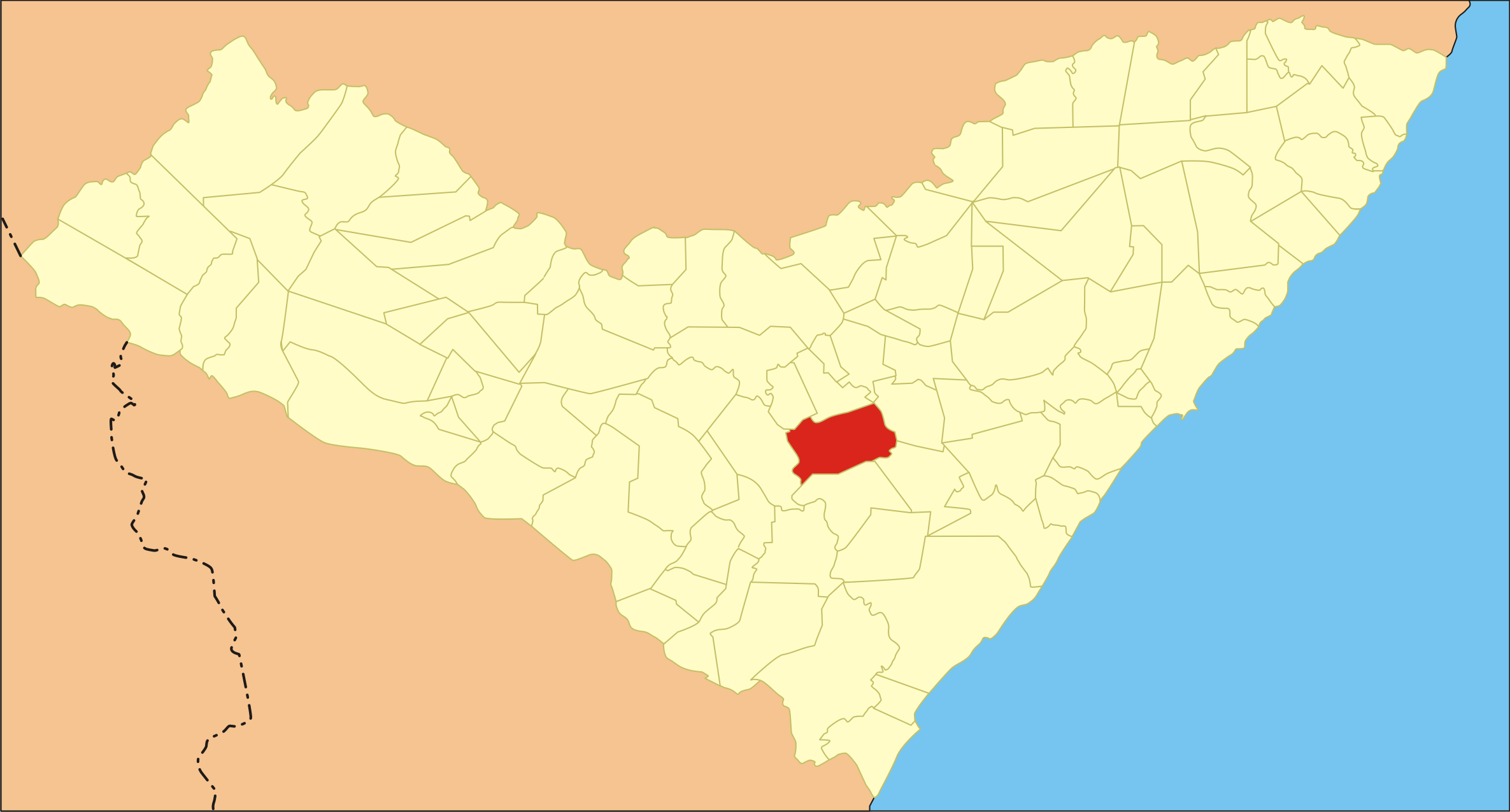
- Location of Limoeiro de Anadia in Alagoas

- Location within Brazil Location within South America
- Coordinates: 9°44′29″S 36°30′12″W
- Country: Brazil
- Region: Northeast
- State: Alagoas
- Founded: 31 May 1882

Government
  - Mayor: James Marlan Ferreira Barbosa (PP) (2025-2028)
  - Vice Mayor: Felipe Soares de Oliveira (PP) (2025-2028)

Area
  - Total: 309.205 km^{2} (119.385 sq mi)
- Elevation: 140 m (460 ft)

Population (2022)
  - Total: 24,740
  - Density: 80.01/km^{2} (207.2/sq mi)
- Demonym: Limoeirense (Brazilian Portuguese)
- Time zone: UTC-03:00 (Brasília Time)
- Postal code: 57260-000
- HDI (2010): 0.580 – medium
- Website: limoeirodeanadia.al.gov.br

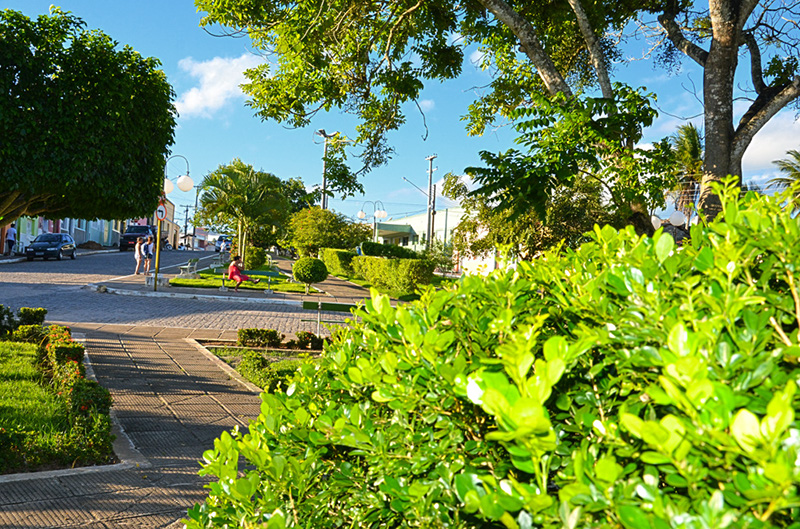

Limoeiro de Anadia (Central northeastern portuguese pronunciation: [limoˈeɾu ˈdi ɐ̃nɐˈdiɐ]) is a municipality located in the Brazilian state of Alagoas. Its population is 28,771 (2020) and its area is 316 km^{2} (122 sq mi).

== See also ==
- List of municipalities in Alagoas
