= Palestina, Alagoas =

Municipality in Alagoas, Brazil

Palestina
- Municipality
- Flag Coat of arms
- Nickname: "Sertão's Star"
- Location within Brazil
- Country: Brazil
- Region: Northeast
- State: Alagoas
- Founded: August 29, 1962

Government
  - Mayor: Jaime do Mercado (Republicanos)

Area
  - Total: 38.21 km^{2} (14.75 sq mi)

Population (2020)
  - Total: 5,037
  - Density: 131.8/km^{2} (341.4/sq mi)
- Demonym: Palestinense
- Time zone: UTC−3 (BRT)
- Postal code: 57410-xxx
- Area code: +55-82
- Website: www.palestina.al.gov.br

Palestina (Central northeastern portuguese pronunciation: [paliʃˈtinɐ]) is a municipality in the state of Alagoas in Brazil. The population is 5,037 (2020 est.) in an area of 38.21 km^{2}. The elevation is 160 m.
