= Olho d'Água Grande =

Municipality of Alagoas, Brazil

- Municipality of Alagoas, Brazil
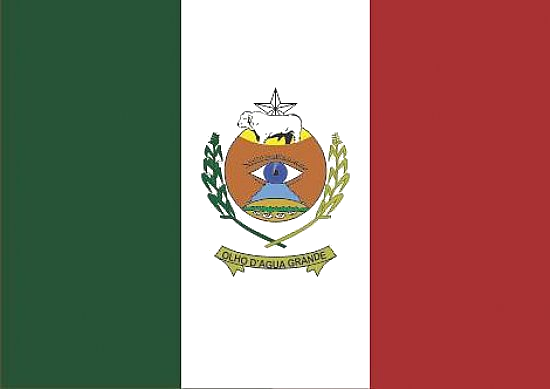
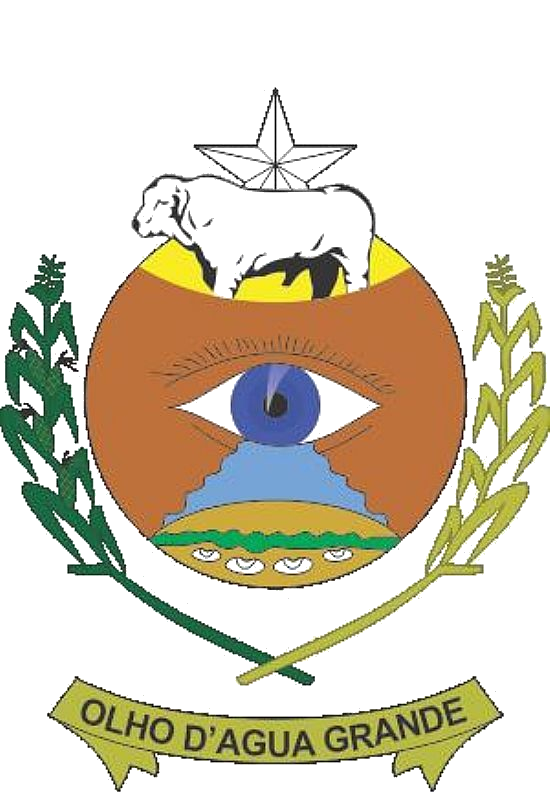
- Flag Coat of arms
- Etymology: Means in Brazilian Portuguese "Big water hole", due to the existence of a water spring in the area
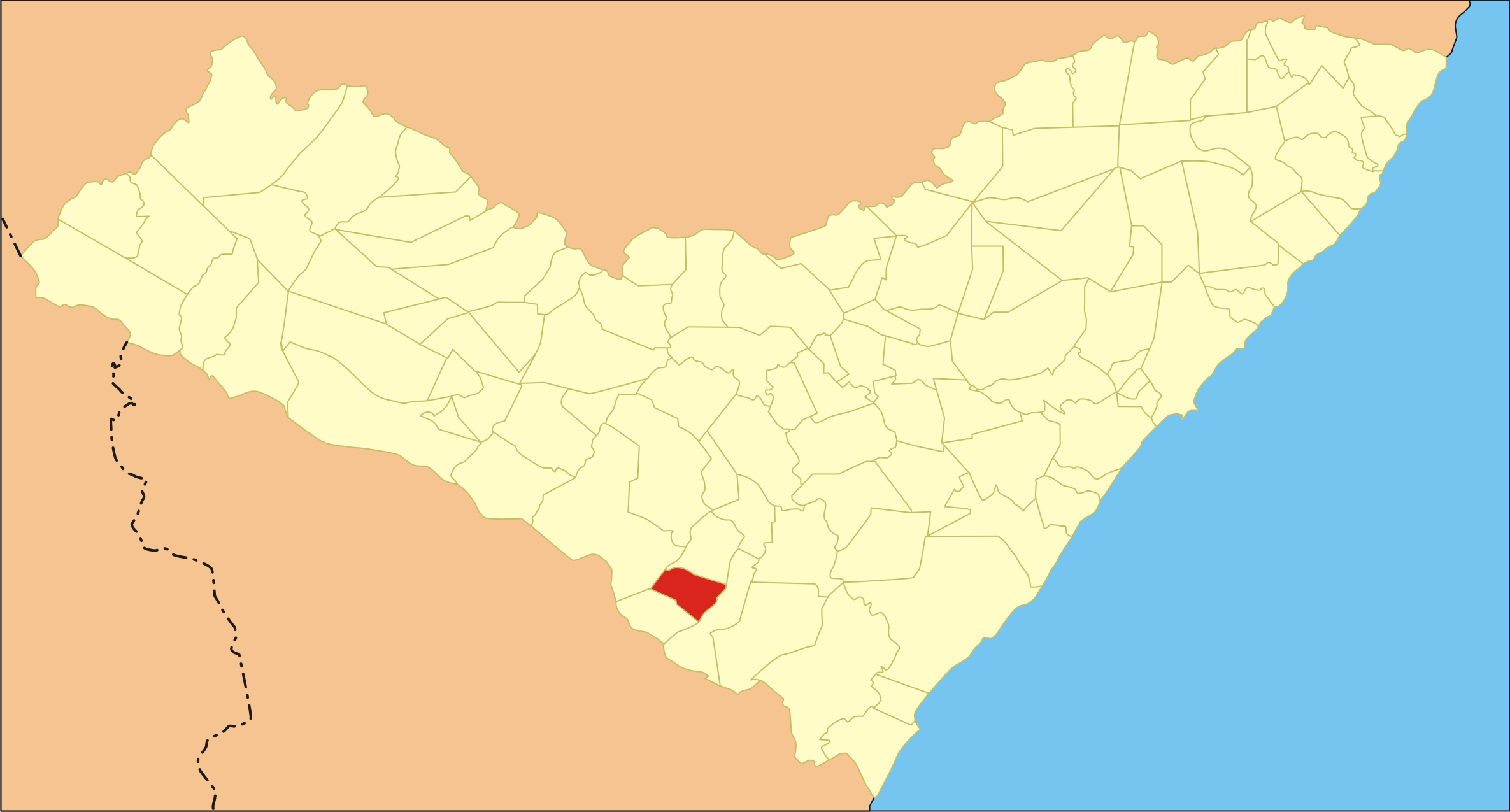
- Location of Olho d'Água Grande in Alagoas

- Location within Brazil Location within South America
- Coordinates: 10°3′28″S 36°49′1″W
- Country: Brazil
- Region: Northeast
- State: Alagoas
- Founded: 21 September 1962

Government
  - Mayor: Maria Suzanice Higino Bahé (PP) (2025-2028)
  - Vice Mayor: Willamara Sousa da Silva (PSB) (2025-2028)

Area
  - Total: 115.509 km^{2} (44.598 sq mi)
- Elevation: 113 m (371 ft)

Population (2022)
  - Total: 4,330
  - Density: 37.01/km^{2} (95.9/sq mi)
- Demonym: Olho-grandense (Brazilian Portuguese)
- Time zone: UTC-03:00 (Brasília Time)
- Postal code: 57390-000
- HDI (2010): 0.503 – low
- Website: olhodaguagrande.al.gov.br

Olho d'Água Grande (Central northeastern portuguese pronunciation: [ˈojʊ ˈdaɡwɐ ˈɡɾɐ̃di]) is a municipality located in the Brazilian state of Alagoas. Its population is 5,128 (2020) and its area is 119 km^{2} (46 sq mi).

== See also ==
- List of municipalities in Alagoas
