= Arthur Lira =

Brazilian politician (born 1969)

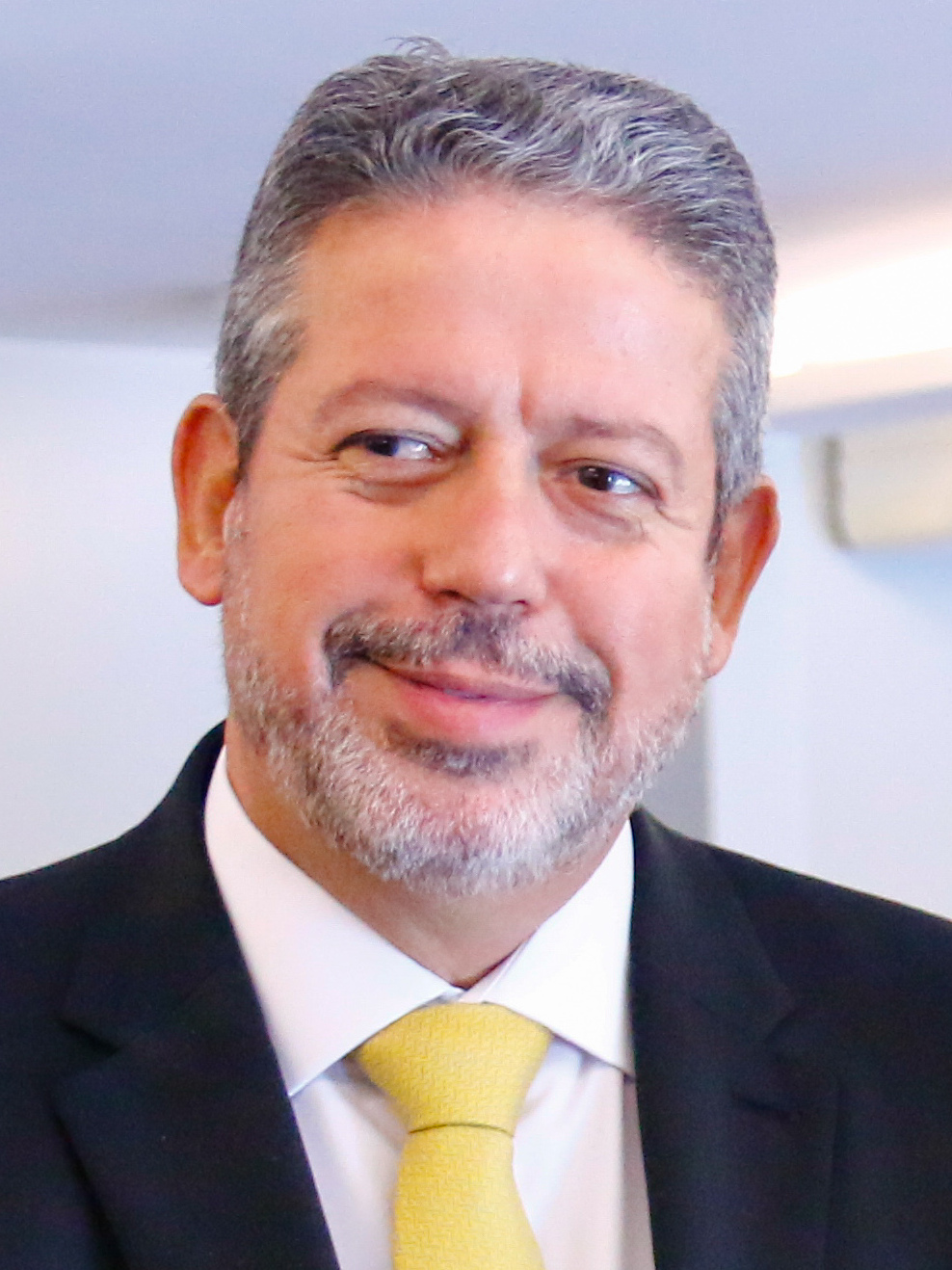
- Lira in 2022

Senator-elect for Alagoas
- Assuming office 1 February 2027

President of the Chamber of Deputies
- In office 1 February 2021 – 1 February 2025
- Preceded by: Rodrigo Maia
- Succeeded by: Hugo Motta

Member of the Chamber of Deputies
- Incumbent
- Assumed office 1 February 2011
- Constituency: Alagoas

State Deputy of Alagoas
- In office 1 February 1999 – 1 February 2011
- Constituency: At-large

Councillor of Maceió
- In office 1 January 1993 – 1 February 1999
- Constituency: At-large

Personal details
- Born: Arthur César Pereira de Lira; 25 June 1969 (age 57) Maceió, Alagoas, Brazil
- Party: PP (since 2009)
- Other political affiliations: PFL (1991–1995); PSDB (1995–2001); PTB (2001–2005); PMN (2005–2009)
- Spouse: Jullyene Lins (m. 1997; div. 2007)
- Children: 3, including Alvinho
- Parents: Benedito de Lira (father); Ivanete Pereira (mother)
- Education: Federal University of Alagoas (LL.B.)
- Profession: Entrepreneur, farmer, lawyer
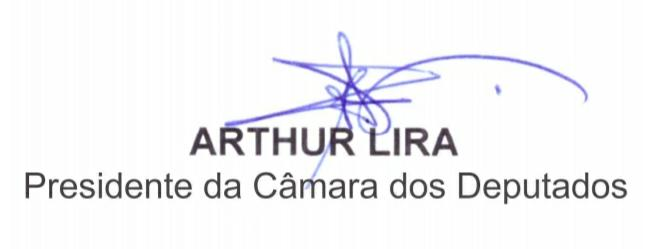
- Signature

Arthur César Pereira de Lira (born 25 June 1969) is a Brazilian lawyer, farmer, entrepreneur and politician. A member of Progressistas (PP), he is a federal deputy for Alagoas, and was President of the Chamber of Deputies from February 2021 to February 2025.

== Career ==
He was elected City Councillor of Maceió in 1992, re-elected in 1996. In 1998, Lira was elected State Deputy, re-elected in 2002 and 2006.

Lira was previously member of the Liberal Front Party (PFL), Brazilian Social Democracy Party (PSDB), Brazilian Labour Party (PTB) and the Party of National Mobilization (PMN).

Filiated to Progressive Party (PP) in 2009, and was elected Federal Deputy in 2010, re-elected in 2014 and 2018.

During his term, he voted to impeach President Dilma Rousseff and in favor of the Constitutional Amendment to limit public expenses (PEC 241) in 2016. In 2017, he was favorable to the Labour Reform (PL 6787/2016) and voted against the two complaints of the Federal Public Prosecutor's Office (MPF) against President Michel Temer in August and in October.

=== Candidate for President of the Chamber of Deputies ===
In January 2021, members of supporting parties of the government of Jair Bolsonaro announced the candidacy of Lira for the command of the Chamber. At first, Lira had the support for 11 parties for the 1 February voting: PSL, PP, PL, PSD, PODE, AVANTE, PTB, PSC, PATRI, PROS and REP. The objective of the group was to defeat the candidate supported by incumbent president Rodrigo Maia, Deputy Baleia Rossi.

== Controversies ==
=== Operation Taturana ===
On 16 December 2011, judge Helestron Costa, of the 17th Court of Public Finances of Maceió, determined the suspension of Arthur Lira from public offices, and also the suspension of State Deputies João Beltrão and Cícero Ferro, of the mayor of Roteiro Fábio Jatobá, of the former state deputy Celso Luiz Brandão, former mayor of Canapi, and of João Beltrão's daughter Jully Beltrão, as a development of Operation Taturana, initiated in 2007. Besides that, the judge ruled to block the assets of all of them. However, later the Justice Court of Alagoas ruled to suspend the effects of the decision after analysing the appeals made by the defense of the parliamentary. The president of the Court, desembargador Sebastião Costa Filho, understood that Lira could not disturb the investigations.

In 2012, Arthur Lira was found guilty by the 17th Civil Court of Maceió in a civil law suit of administrative dishonesty by the same case. Arthur was 1st Secretary of the Director's Board of the Legislative Assembly of Alagoas and had manipulated the payroll, making undue discounts of checks of the Assembly. However, he appealed the conviction.

Before this, in 2008, Lira had been arrested for obstruction of justice. He had been suspended from his functions in the Legislative Assembly since 17 March for his involvement in the Case of Taturanas, accused of participating in a fraud scheme that emblezzed R$280 million (US$165.7 million) of the legislative branch, besides having his goods blocked.

=== Illicit enrichment ===
In 2016, journalist Chico de Gois, from O Globo, released a book called "Os Ben$ que os Políticos Fazem" (The well-doing$ of Politicians), which hit directly Arthur Lira and his father, Benedito de Lira. The book brings 10 cases of Brazilian politicians who got rich during their time in office. Among them, it brings the enrichment of three sons of politicians whom, despite young, had a fortune greater than their parents', who are in the politics for years. Besides Lira, other cited politicians were João Henrique Caldas and Wilson Filho.

According to the publishing, Arthur had a net worth of R$79,000 (US$76,000) in 1996. In 2006, after ten years, this value rose to more than R$695,000 (US$325,527). In 2010, after 14 years and three terms (two as State Deputy and one as Federal Deputy), his patrimony grew to more than R$2 million (US$1.2 million). Besides this growth, he didn't declare goods, such as, an apartment of the neighbourhood of Jatiúca, in Maceió. Along with his father, he also didn't declare they were partners in the company D'Lira Agropecuária e Eventos, founded in 2007. The book also describes the accusation that the parliamentarian was member of a scheme of resources embezzlement from the Legislative Assembly of Alagoas, in the Operation Taturana, where he is described by the Federal Police as a politician "with no limits to usurp public money".

=== Accusation of domestic violence ===
In December 2013, the Supreme Federal Court opened an inquiry for alleged bodily injury against his ex-wife, which supposedly happened in 2006, seven months after their divorce. In September 2015, the Second Group of the Supreme Court, unanimously acquitted the federal deputy from the crimes of threat and bodily injury. The report of the Prosecutor General of the Republic recommended the acquitting of the parliamentarian for two reasons: first, the evidence set was not enough to prove that there was domestic violence; second, Lira's ex-wife acknowledged that "[she] had done it as vengeance".

The complaint was received by the floor of the Supreme Court on 5 December 2013, being opened in a voting of 6-3, with the majority understanding that there was "minimal support as to the existence of evidence of authorship and materiality of the offense". Justices Celso de Mello, Gilmar Mendes and Cármen Lúcia joined the vote of the rapporteur, Justice Teori Zavascki. The parliamentarian, in the inquiry, had been accused with base in Paragraph 9th of Article 129 of the Penal Code, introduced by Maria da Penha Law (Law 11,340/2006).

Lira's defence accused his ex-wife of lying in her testimony to jeopardize the parliamentary. According to lawyer Fernanda Tortima, "she made the corpus delicti exam, and the expert didn't see any cut in her lips. She said she was beaten for 40 minutes, and the result are four bruises in her arms and legs. [They] Lied. The witness posteriorly signed a statement taking back what they said, and says clearly they never witnessed any aggression and that they signed the statement in the Women's Police Station without even reading it".

On 1 April 2008, Lira was taken by teams of the Civil Police, with the support of the National Security Forces, and was arrested in the Fire Department Command. A bailiff should deliver an intimation to testify in an accusation of aggression against his ex-wife. In the occasion the bailiff informed desembargador Orlando Manso that the parliamentarian refused to receive the document. In a testimony, Lira affirmed he didn't refuse, only asked to wait until the end of the session in the Legislative Assembly. The Deputy was not handcuffed and arrived in the headquarters of the Civil Police driving his own car, along with two civil police officers and escorted by a team of the National Force. After the testimony and corpus delicti exam, Lira was kept in the Fire Department Command.

In February 2015, Jullyene Cristine Santos Lins changed her testimony in an instruction audice in the Supreme Court, denying she was beaten by Lira, as she informed previously.

=== Operation Car Wash ===
On 4 September 2015, Prosecutor General Rodrigo Janot presented complaints to the Supreme Federal Court against Lira and his father, Senator Benedito de Lira, for involvement in a corruption scheme in Petrobras investigated in Operation Car Wash. In the complaint, Janot asks for the conviction of both for the crimes of corruption and money laundering.

During the investigations, the former Petrobras director Paulo Roberto Costa affirmed, in a plea, that he sent R$1 million (US$568,000), through Alberto Youssef, for his father's campaign to the Senate in 2010. The value, according to Costa, comes from a "quota" for the Progressive Party in a corruption scheme due to overpricing in contracts of Petrobras. In the case of Deputy Lira, Youssef affirmed, also in a plea, that he paid for expenses in the parliamentary campaign in 2010. The banker also said that he knew from the Deputy's advisor that Lira received R$100,000 (US$56,818) in cash, but he was detained with the money in Congonhas Airport in São Paulo. Also, according to the banker, the lawmaker received monthly transfers between R$30,000 and R$150,000 from the party's "quota". In a report sent to the Supreme Court, the Federal Police appointed also that businessman Ricardo Pessoa, from UTC Engenharia, also affirmed in plea testimonies that both of them were benefited with money embezzled from Petrobras. On 1 September, the police has sent the report to the Supreme Court, in which they point to evidence of passive corruption of two lawmakers and requested, as a precautionary measure in a separate procedure, the suspensions of both from public offices.

Arthur Lira had been photographed in the entrance of Youssef's building, in São Paulo. According to the lawmaker, he was there to talk about donation for his father's campaign to the Senate in 2010. That year, while he was raising money for Benedito, Arthur said he received a call from Deputy José Janene, then treasurer of the Progressive Party. Janene scheduled a meeting with Lira in Youssef's office, identifying the banker only as "cousin". Lira said he went there without knowing he was a banker. Arriving at the office, Youssef was alone, without Janene, and had said it would be hard to get donations to Benedito. In his point of view, he couldn't defeat Renan Calheiros and Heloísa Helena in the race for two seats in the Senate for Alagoas that year. The lawmaker thanked for his time and left. Weeks later, however, Lira said he received another call, in which Janene said that Construtora Constan would donate R$400,000 for the campaign. He returned to Youssef's office one more time but, according to him, he would learn who the banker was only years later.

Besides him, other lawmakers where recorded in front of the same building. Four from the same party as Lira, Mário Negromonte, Aline Corrêa, Nelson Meurer and João Pizzolatti, besides Luiz Argôlo (SD) and the impeached Deputy André Vargas (PT).

In February 2016, the Supreme Court ruled for the block of the goods of Arthur and Benedito de Lira. The request came from the Federal Police and was endorsed by the Federal Public Prosecutor's Office. The blocking reached R$4.2 million (US$1.489 million).

=== Eduardo Cunha ===
Arthur Lira is considered one of the main allies of the then President of the Chamber of Deputies Eduardo Cunha, appointed by him, in February 2015, as Chair of the Constitution and Justice Committee, one of the most important of the Brazilian Congress. All of the projects of the House need to be approved by this committee.

Cunha also appointed Lira to be Chair of the Budget Committee in May 2016, when he was suspended from office by the Supreme Court.

Lira was also designated as rapporteur of an inquiry opened by acting president Waldir Maranhão about the impeachment of parliamentarians, in a trial to save Cunha's term. Maranhão is also member of the Progressive Party and Cunha's ally. Lira presented a report in which he defends the presentation to the floor of a Resolution Project, not the report made by the Ethics Council with the voting authorizing the impeachment of Eduardo Cunha.

=== Expired driver's licence ===
In 2009, Lira had his National Qualification Card apprehended during a police inspection in the center of Maceió, due to the Easter holiday, receiving a fine of R$540 (US$244). The lawmaker's driver's licence had been expired since October 2008. The document was forwarded to the State Department of Transit (Detran) and his vehicle was only released after Lira entered in contact with a person with a valid licence to drive it.

Political offices
Preceded by Rodrigo Maia	President of the Chamber of Deputies; 2021–2025	Succeeded by Hugo Motta
