= Benedito de Lira =

Brazilian politician (1942–2025)

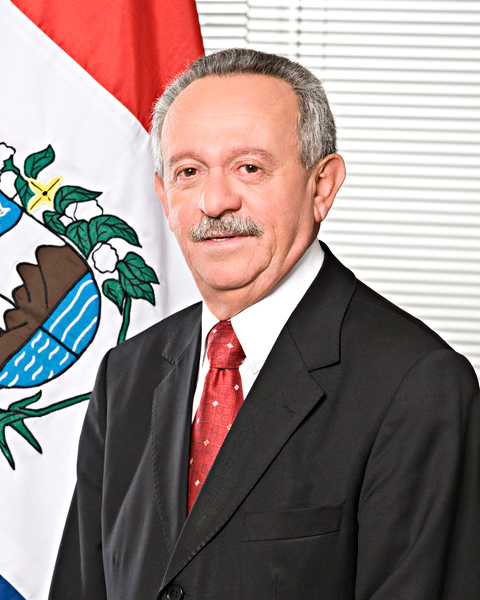

Mayor of Barra de São Miguel
- In office 1 January 2021 – 14 January 2025
- Vice Mayor: Floriano Melo (2021–2024); Henrique Alves Pinto (2025)
- Preceded by: José Medeiros Nicolau
- Succeeded by: Henrique Alves Pinto

Senator for Alagoas
- In office 1 February 2011 – 1 February 2019
- Preceded by: João Tenório
- Succeeded by: Rodrigo Cunha

Member of the Chamber of Deputies
- In office 1 February 2003 – 1 February 2011
- Constituency: Alagoas
- In office 1 February 1995 – 1 February 1999
- Constituency: Alagoas

Member of the Legislative Assembly of Alagoas
- In office 1 January 1983 – 1 January 1995
- Constituency: At-large

Member of the Municipal Chamber of Maceió
- In office 1 January 1967 – 1 January 1983
- Constituency: At-large

Personal details
- Born: 1 May 1941} Junqueiro, Alagoas, Brazil
- Died: 14 January 2025 (aged 83) Maceió, Alagoas, Brazil
- Party: ARENA (1965–1979); PDS (1980–1985); PFL (1985–2002); PTB (2002–2003); PP (2003–2025)
- Relatives: Arthur Lira (son); Alvinho Lira (grandson)
- Education: Federal University of Alagoas (LL.B.)
- Profession: Lawyer

Benedito de Lira (1 May 1942 – 14 January 2025) was a Brazilian politician from Alagoas, member of Progressistas (PP), Senator for his state and Mayor of Barra de São Miguel.

== Life and career ==
Lira was born on 1 May 1942. He earned a Bachelor of Laws from the Federal University of Alagoas (UFAL). Lira began his political career as City Councillor in his hometown between 1966 and 1970, and later as City Councillor of Maceió for two consecutive terms, between 1973 and 1982. He was State Deputy from 1983 to 1994.

In 2002, Lira was elected Federal Deputy for the Brazilian Labour Party (PTB), and re-elected in 2006 for the Progressive Party (PP).

In 2010, he was elected Senator with 904,345 votes, representing 35.94% of the valid votes.

In December 2016, he voted in favor of the Constitutional Amendment to limit public expenses (PEC 241). In July 2017, voted to approve the new Labour Reform.

In October 2017, voted to maintain Senator Aécio Neves (PSDB-MG) in office, suspending the effects of the decision of the First Group of the Supreme Federal Court, in an investigation which he is accused of corruption and obstruction of justice after asking for R$ 2 million (US$ 600,000 in 2017) to businessman Joesley Batista.

Lira died from cancer on 14 January 2025, at the age of 83.

== Controversies ==
=== Ambulances mafia ===
Benedito de Lira was one of the involved in the scandal of overpriced ambulances, also known as "leeches".

=== Corruption in Petrobras ===
Benedito de Lira, along with his son Arthur Lira, was investigated by the Federal Police in the scheme of corruption in the state oil company Petrobras. The Police found evidences of passive corruption after the conclusion of open inquiries to investigate the participation of Benedito and Arthur Lira. According to the report, Arthur and Benedito "benefited with the receiving of undue periodic amounts, from the payment of bribes by companies which had contracts with Petrobras, due to the control of the Progressive Party of the Directory of Supplies, office held by Paulo Roberto Costa, in exchange for votes in projects of interest of the federal government".

In February 2016, Lira had his goods blocked by the Supreme Federal Court, in a decision ruled by Justice Teori Zavascki, in a total of R$1.6 million (US$ 460,000) The request for the blocking was made by the Prosecutor General Rodrigo Janot, who was responsible for the investigation against federal parliamentarians in the operation.
