= Alvinho Lira =

Brazilian politician (born 2006)

Member-elect of the Chamber of Deputies
- Assuming office 1 February 2027
- Constituency: Alagoas

Personal details
- Born: Álvaro Lins Pereira de Lira; 17 March 2006 (age 20) Maceió, Alagoas, Brazil
- Party: PP
- Parents: Arthur Lira (father); Jullyene Lins (mother)
- Relatives: Benedito de Lira (grandfather)

Álvaro Lins Pereira de Lira (born 17 March 2006), better known as Alvinho Lira, is a Brazilian politician who was elected member of the Chamber of Deputies in 2026. He is the youngest-ever member of the Chamber. He is son to former President of the Chamber and senator-elect Arthur Lira and the grandson to late former senator Benedito de Lira.
