= Bom Retiro, Santa Catarina =

Coordinates: 27°47′50″S 49°29′21″W

- Municipality
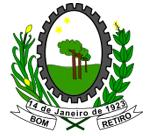
- Flag Coat of arms
- Interactive map of Bom Retiro, Santa Catarina
- Country: Brazil
- Region: South
- State: Santa Catarina
- Mesoregion: Serrana

Area
  - Total: 407.531 sq mi (1,055.501 km^{2})

Population (2020)
  - Total: 10,060
- Time zone: UTC -3

Bom Retiro, Santa Catarina is a municipality in the state of Santa Catarina in the South region of Brazil. As of the 2020 estimate, Bom Retiro had a population of 10,060.

== History ==
Bom Retiro was discovered on 12 April 1791, and it became a municipality on 4 October 1922.

== Climate ==
According to the Köppen climate classification, Bom Retiro has a oceanic climate (Cfb), the annual temperature on summer is 24°C, and the average temperature on winter are 18°C.

== Notable people ==
- Nelson Meurer, politician

== See also ==
- List of municipalities in Santa Catarina
