= Barra de São Miguel, Alagoas =

Municipality of Alagoas, Brazil

Barra de São Miguel
- Municipality
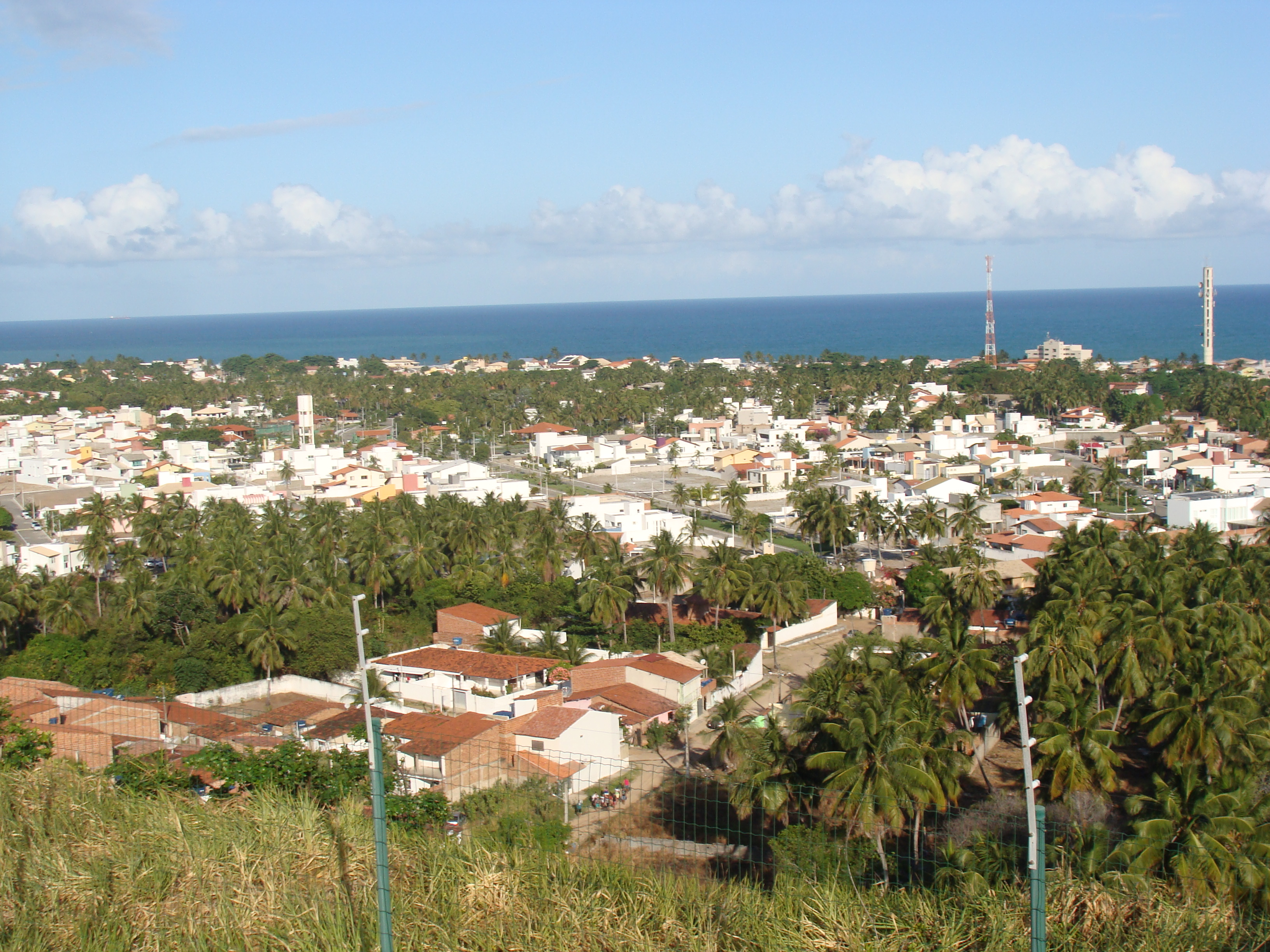
- Aerial view of Barra de São Miguel

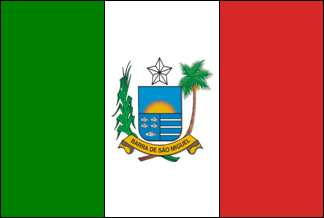
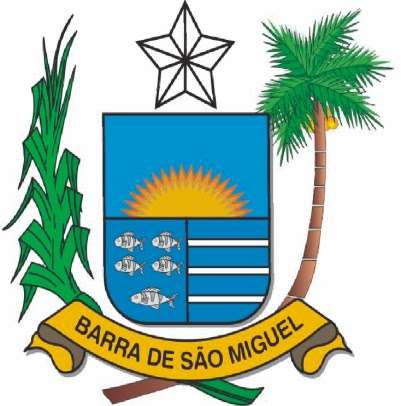
- Flag Coat of arms

- Location of Barra de São Miguel in Alagoas

- Location within Brazil Location within South America
- Coordinates: 9°50′24″S 35°54′28″W
- Country: Brazil
- Region: Northeast
- State: Alagoas
- Founded: 2 July 1963

Government
  - Mayor: Luiz Henrique Lima Alves Pinto (PP) (2025-2028)
  - Vice Mayor (acting): Diney Apratto Torres Pugliesi (PP)

Area
  - Total: 74.247 km^{2} (28.667 sq mi)
- Elevation: 5 m (16 ft)

Population (2022)
  - Total: 7,944
  - Density: 106.99/km^{2} (277.1/sq mi)
- Demonym: Barrense (Brazilian Portuguese)
- Time zone: UTC-03:00 (Brasília Time)
- Postal code: 57180-000
- HDI (2010): 0.615 – medium
- Website: barradesaomiguel.al.gov.br

Barra de São Miguel (Central northeastern portuguese pronunciation: [ˈbaɦɐ ˈdɪ ˈsɐ̃w miˈɡɛw]) is a municipality located in the Brazilian state of Alagoas. Its population is 8,378 (2020) and its area is 77 km^{2}.

== Geography ==
=== Climate ===
Barra has a typical tropical climate, with warm to hot temperatures and high relative humidity all throughout the year. However, these conditions are relieved by a near absence of extreme temperatures and pleasant trade winds blowing from the ocean. January is the warmest month, with mean maxima of 31 °C and minima of 22 °C and more sun; July experiences the coolest temperatures, with mean maxima of 26 °C and minima of 17 °C and more rain.

=== Vegetation ===
Barra has a tropical forest. Rainforests are characterized by high rainfall, with definitions setting minimum normal annual rainfall between 2,000 mm (about 78 inches or 2 meters) and 1700 mm (about 67 inches). The soil can be poor because high rainfall tends to leach out soluble nutrients. There are several common characteristics of tropical rainforest trees. Tropical rainforest species frequently possess one or more attributes not commonly seen in trees of higher latitudes or trees in drier conditions on the same latitude.

== Demographics ==
As of the census of 2004, the population was 7.112 hab.

=== Barra ethnic groups ===
According to the 2007 census, the racial makeup of the city was:

- Majority White and Multiracial.
- Minority Black.

=== Barra demographics history ===
1. Amerindians, Brazil's indigenous population, came from human groups that migrated from Siberia across the Bering Strait around 9000 BC.

2. Portuguese colonists and settlers, arriving from 1500 onward.

3. Diverse groups of immigrants from Europe arriving in Barra during the late 19th and early 20th centuries. And now, because of tourism.

4. African slaves brought to the country from 1530 until the end of the slave trade in 1850.

== Economy ==
=== Alcohol in Alagoas State (Clean Air) ===
Alagoas State has the third highest sugarcane production in Brazil. Brazil is by far the largest producer of alcohol fuel in the world, typically fermenting ethanol from sugarcane and sugar beets. The country produces a total of 18 billion liters annually, of which 3.5 billion are exported, 2 billion of them to the United States. Alcohol cars debuted in the Brazilian market in 1978 and became quite popular because of heavy subsidy, but in the 1980s prices rose and gasoline regained the leading market share. But since 2004, alcohol has rapidly risen in market share once again because of new technologies involving hybrid fuel car engines called "Flex" by all major car manufacturers. "Flex" engines work with gasoline, alcohol or any mixture of both fuels. As of February 2007, about 80% of new vehicles sold in Brazil are hybrid fuel. Because of the Brazilian leading production and technology, many countries became very interested in importing alcohol fuel and adopting the "Flex" vehicle concept. On March 7 of 2007, US president George W. Bush visited the city of São Paulo to sign agreements with Brazilian president Luiz Inácio Lula da Silva on importing alcohol and its technology as an alternative fuel.

== Culture ==
=== Festas Juninas ===
Festa Junina was introduced to Northeastern Brazil by the Portuguese for whom St John's day (also celebrated as Midsummer Day in several European countries), on 24 June, is one of the oldest and most popular celebrations of the year. Differently, from what happens on the European Midsummer Day, the festivities in Brazil do not take place during the summer solstice but during the tropical winter solstice. The festivities traditionally begin after the 12th of June, on the eve of St Anthony's day, and last until the 29th, which is Saint Peter's day. During these fifteen days, there are bonfires, fireworks, and folk dancing in the streets. Once exclusively a rural festivity, today, in Brazil, it is largely a city festival during which people joyfully and theatrically mimic peasant stereotypes and cliches in a spirit of joke and good time. Typical refreshments and dishes are served. Like during Carnival, these festivities involve costumes-wearing (in this case, peasant costumes), dancing, heavy drinking, and visual spectacles (fireworks display and folk dancing). Like what happens on Midsummer and St John's Day in Europe, bonfires are a central part of these festivities in Brazil.

=== Carnival ===
The four-day period before Lent leading up to Ash Wednesday is carnival time in Brazil. Rich and poor alike forget their cares as they party in the streets.

== Gallery ==
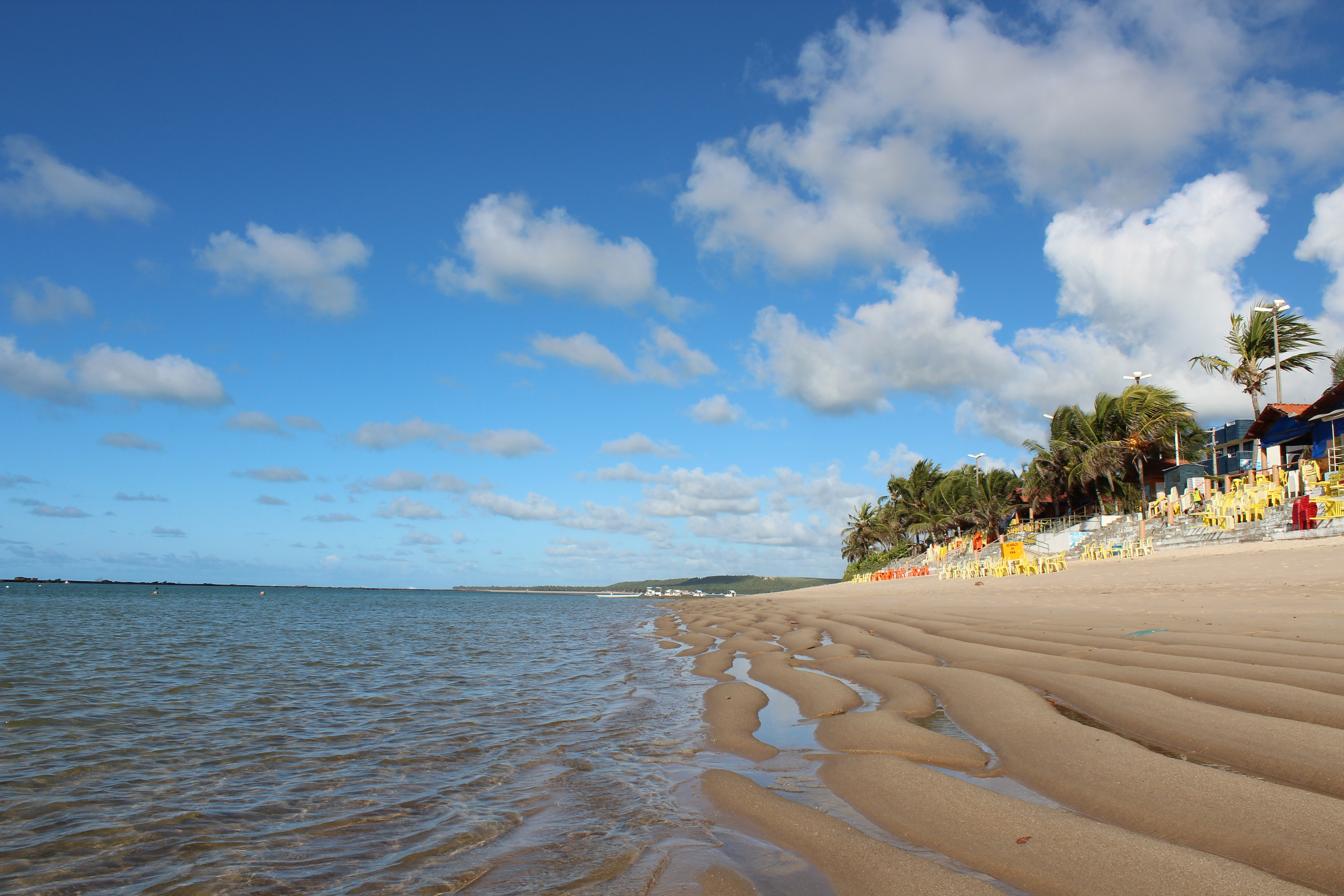
Beach in Barra de São Miguel

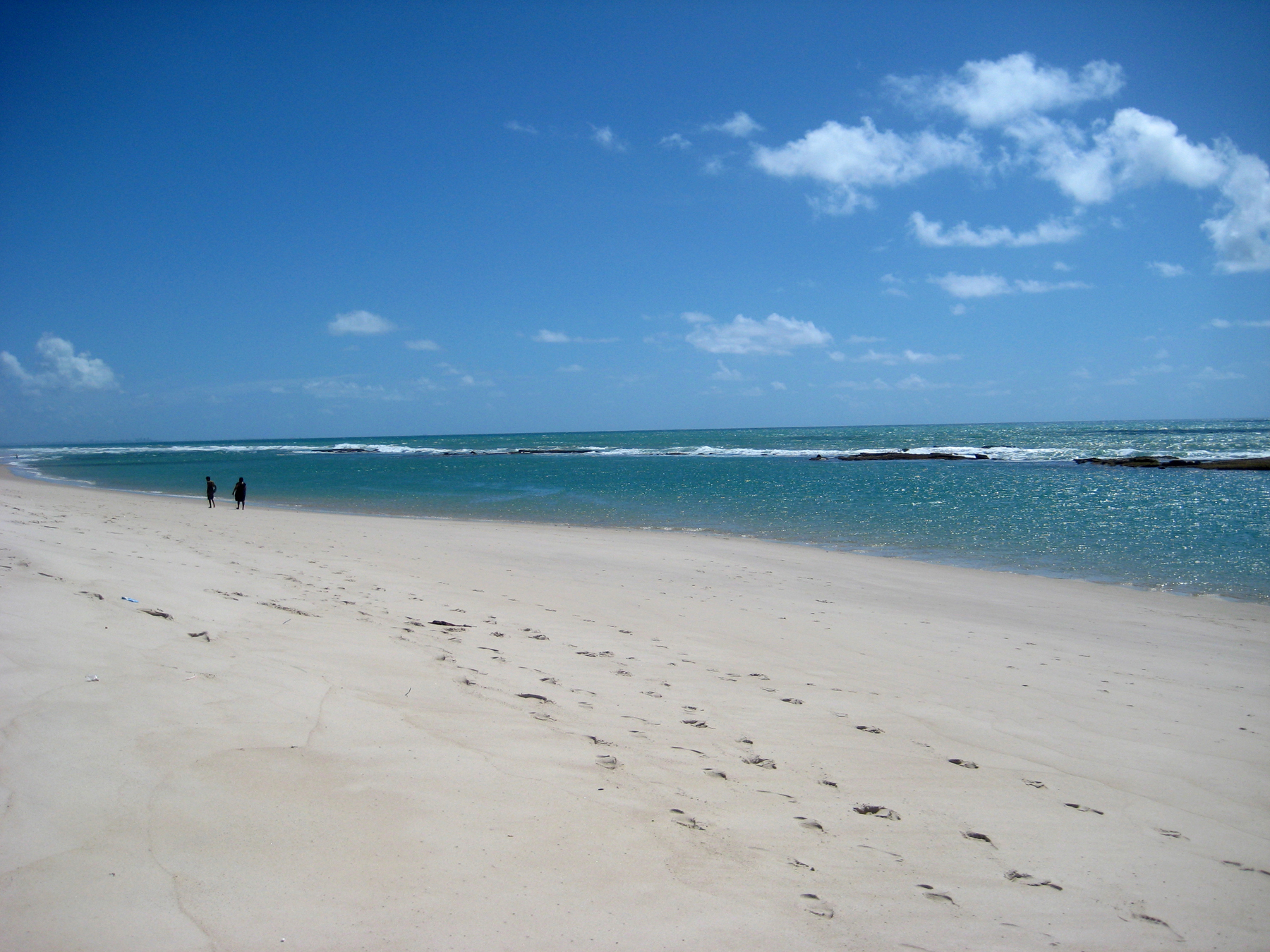
Beach in Barra de São Miguel

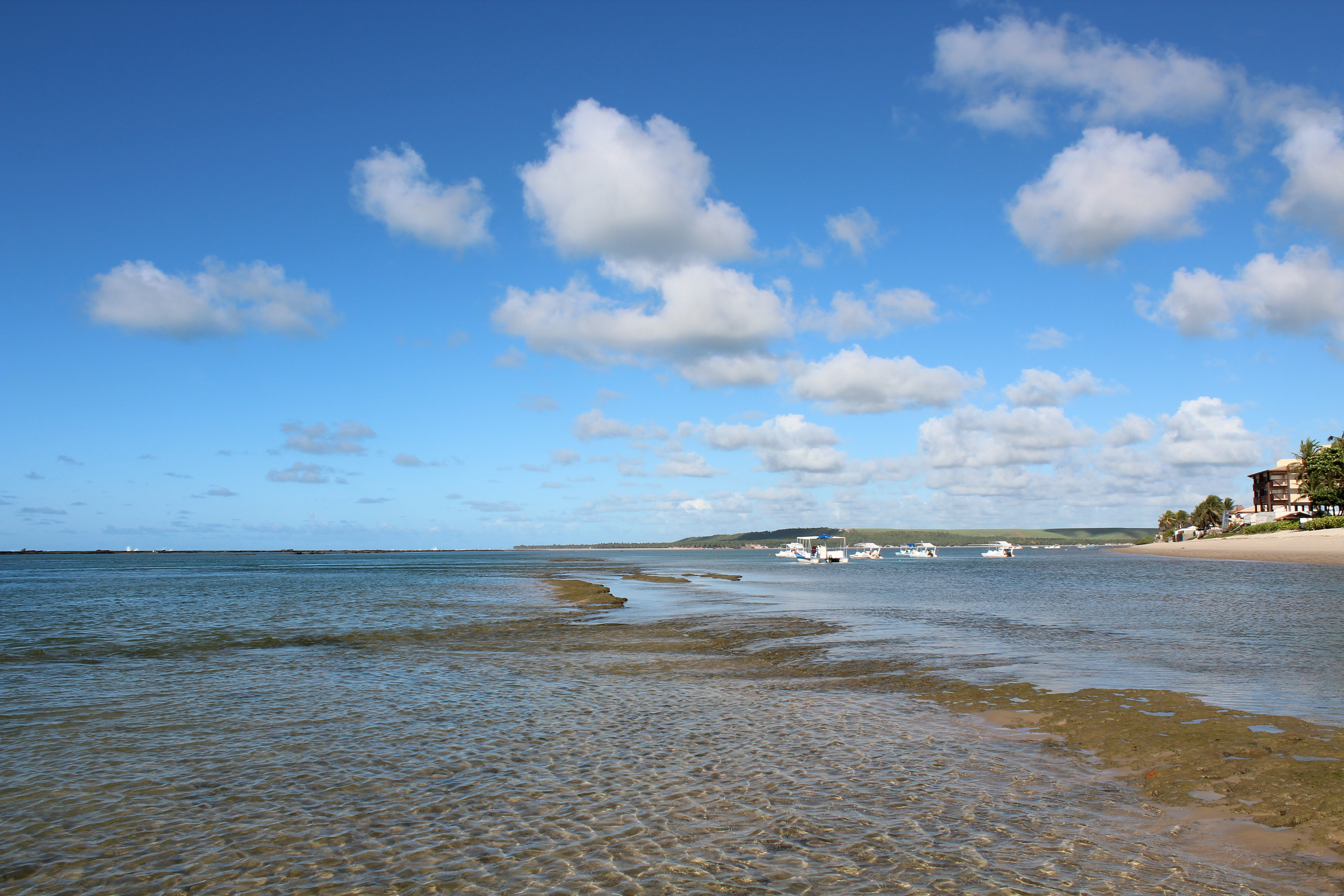
Beach in Barra de São Miguel

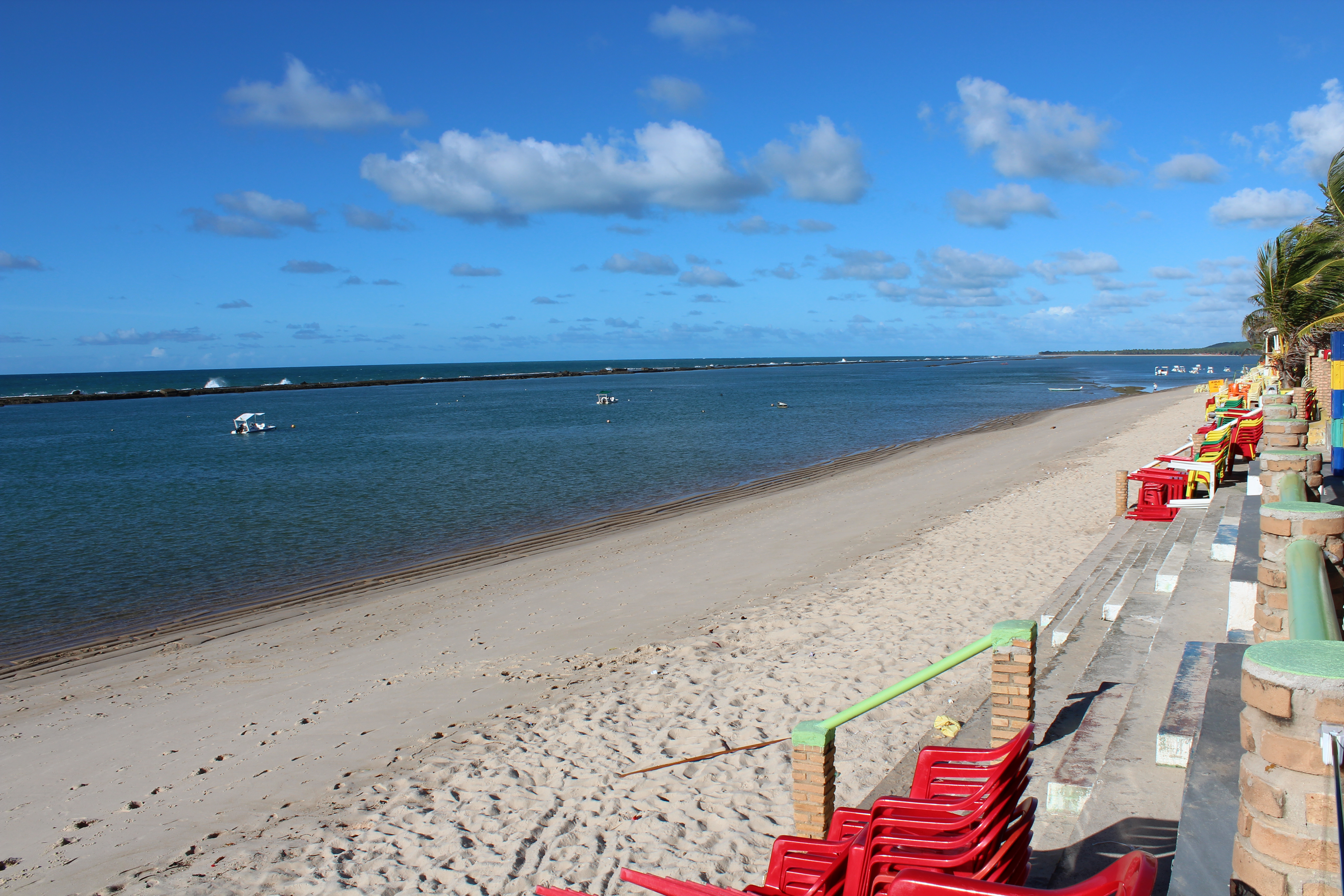
Beach in Barra de São Miguel

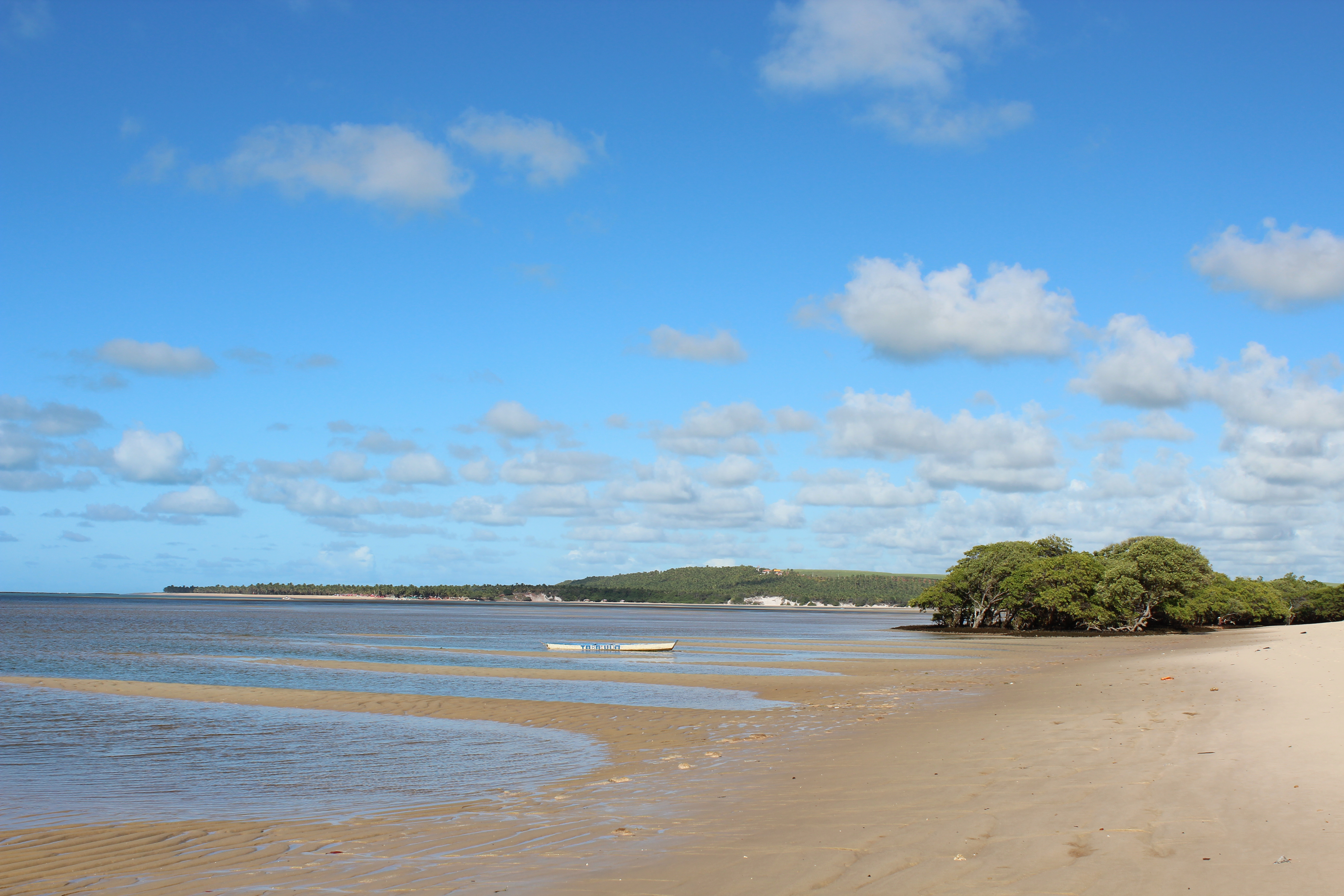
Beach in Barra de São Miguel

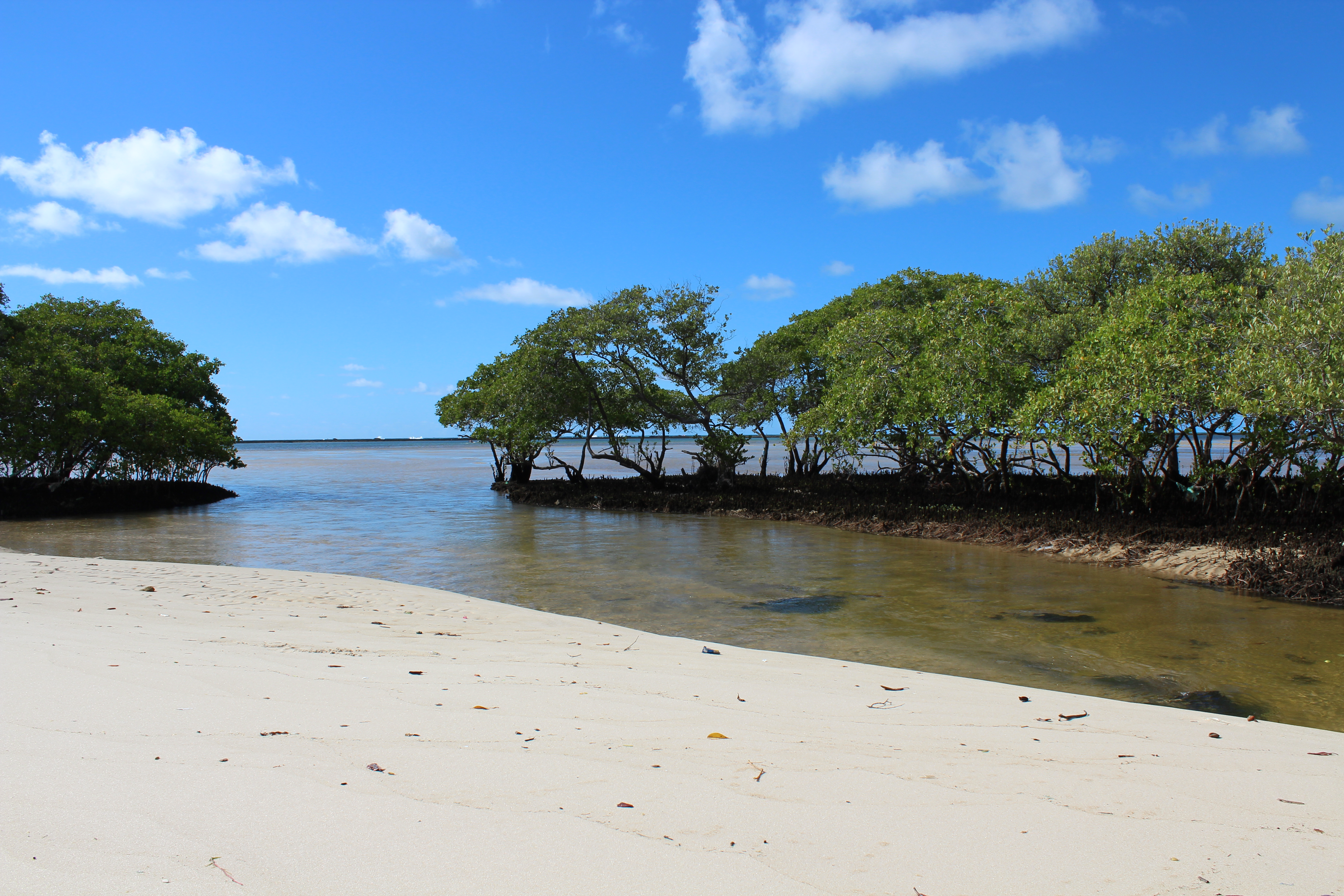
Beach in Barra de São Miguel

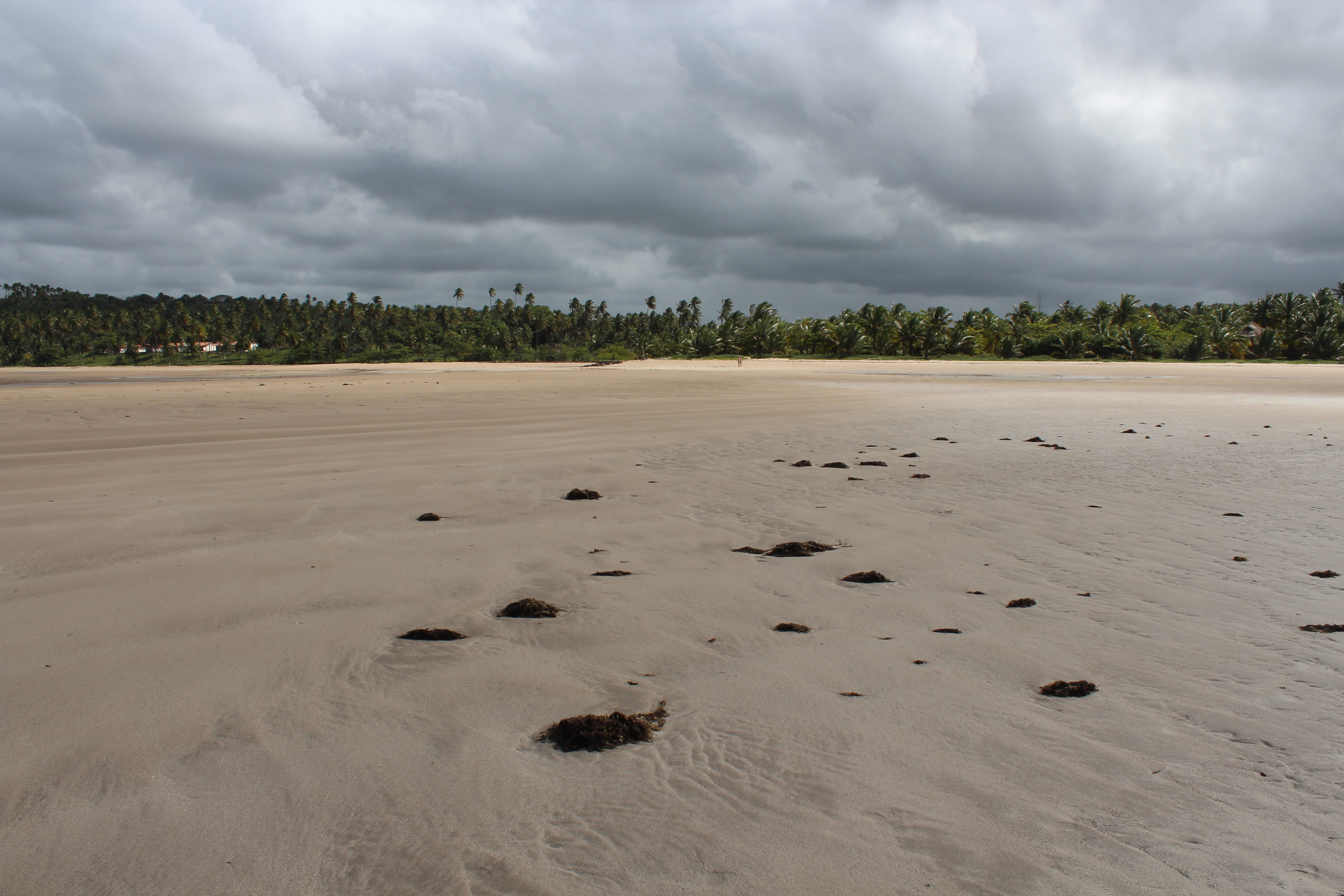
Beach in Barra de São Miguel

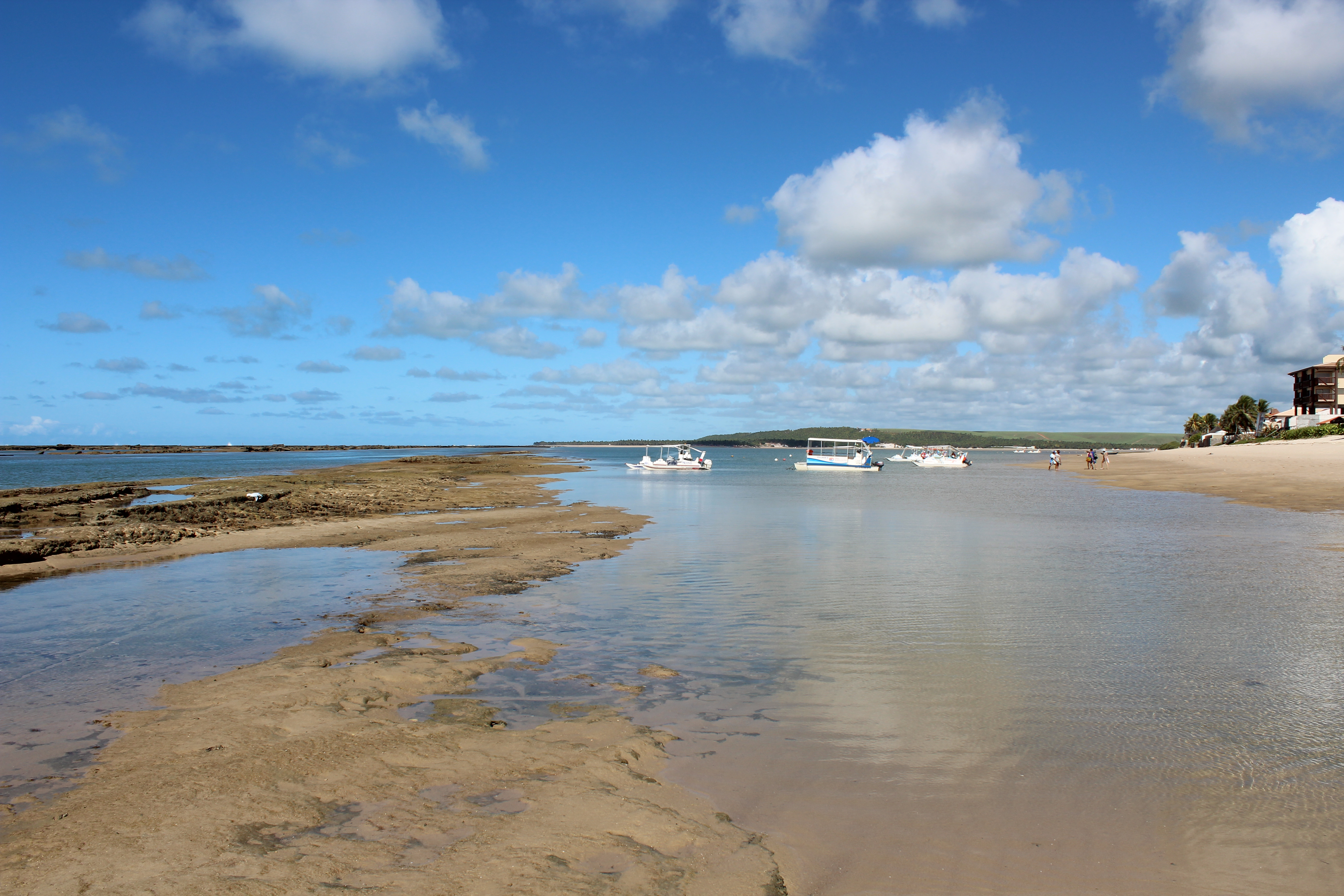
Beach in Barra de São Miguel

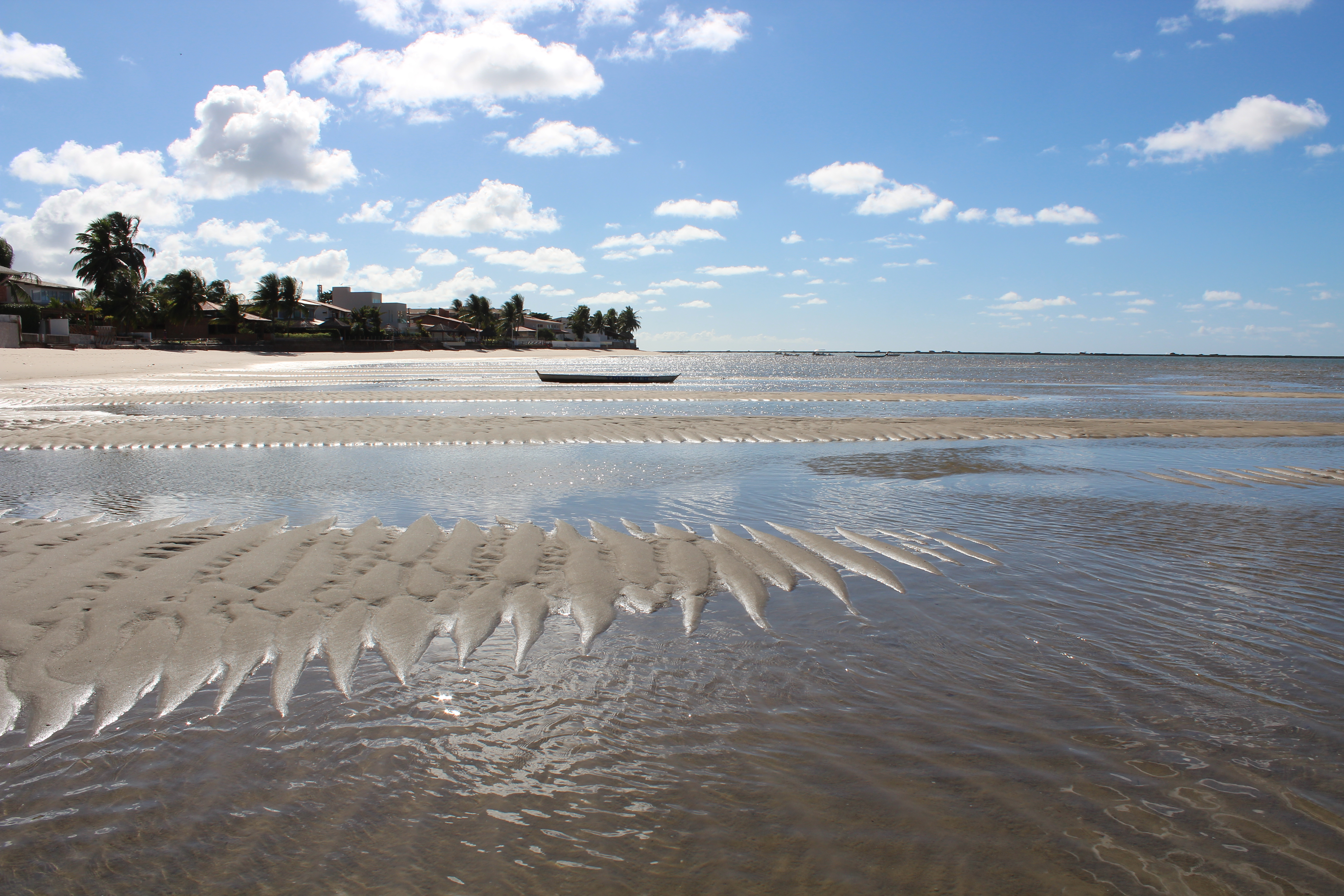
Beach in Barra de São Miguel

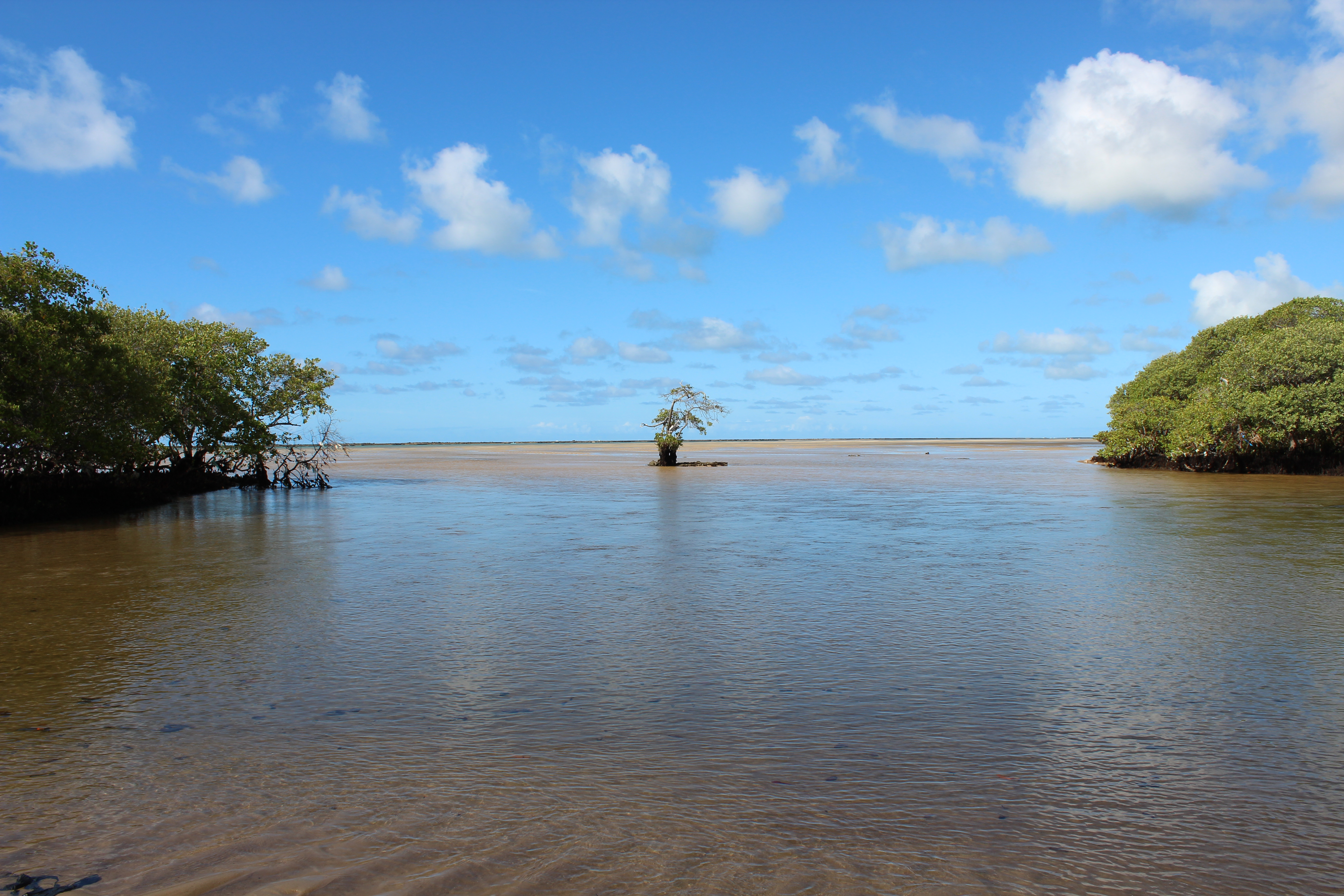
Mangroves in Barra de São Miguel

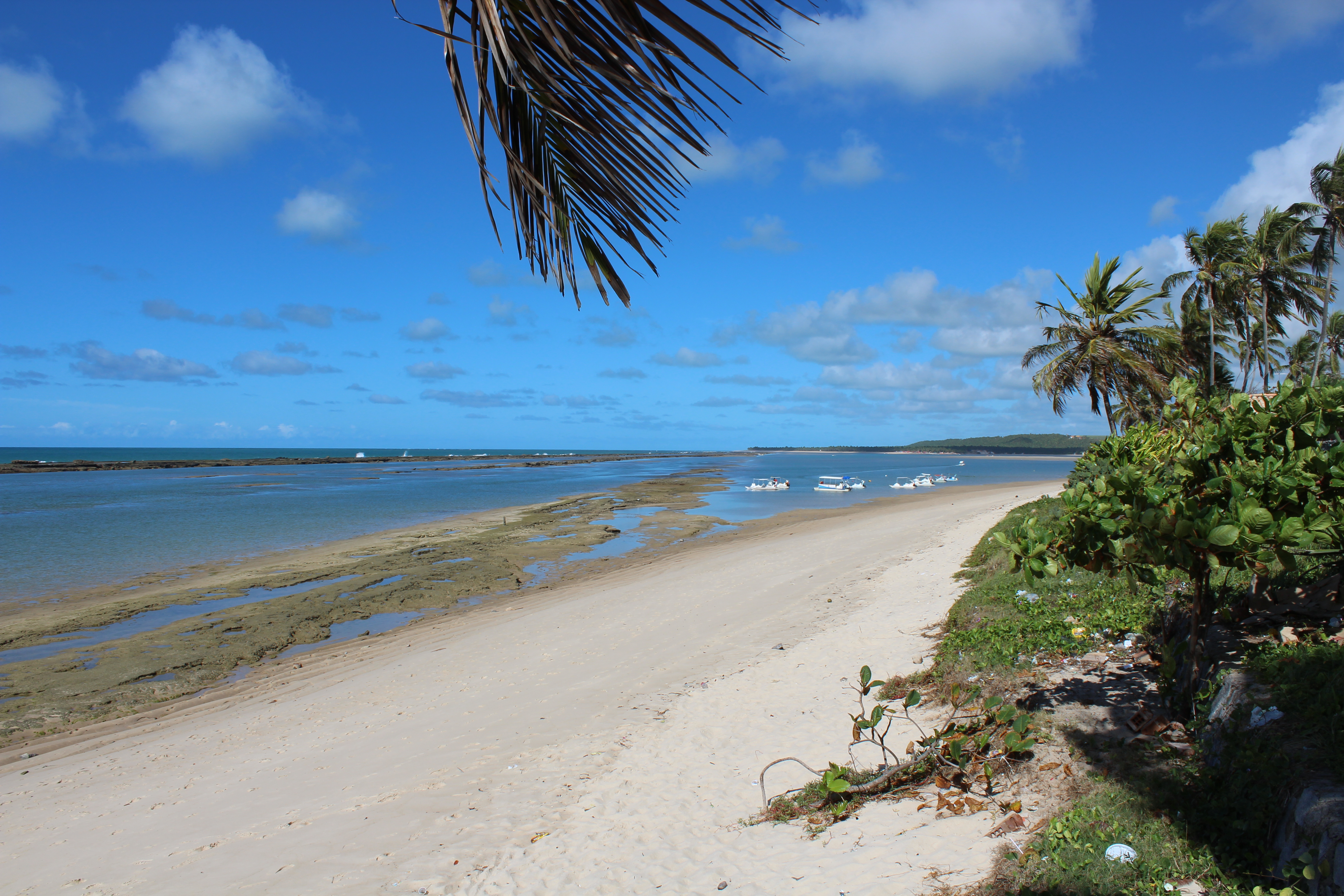
Beach in Barra de São Miguel

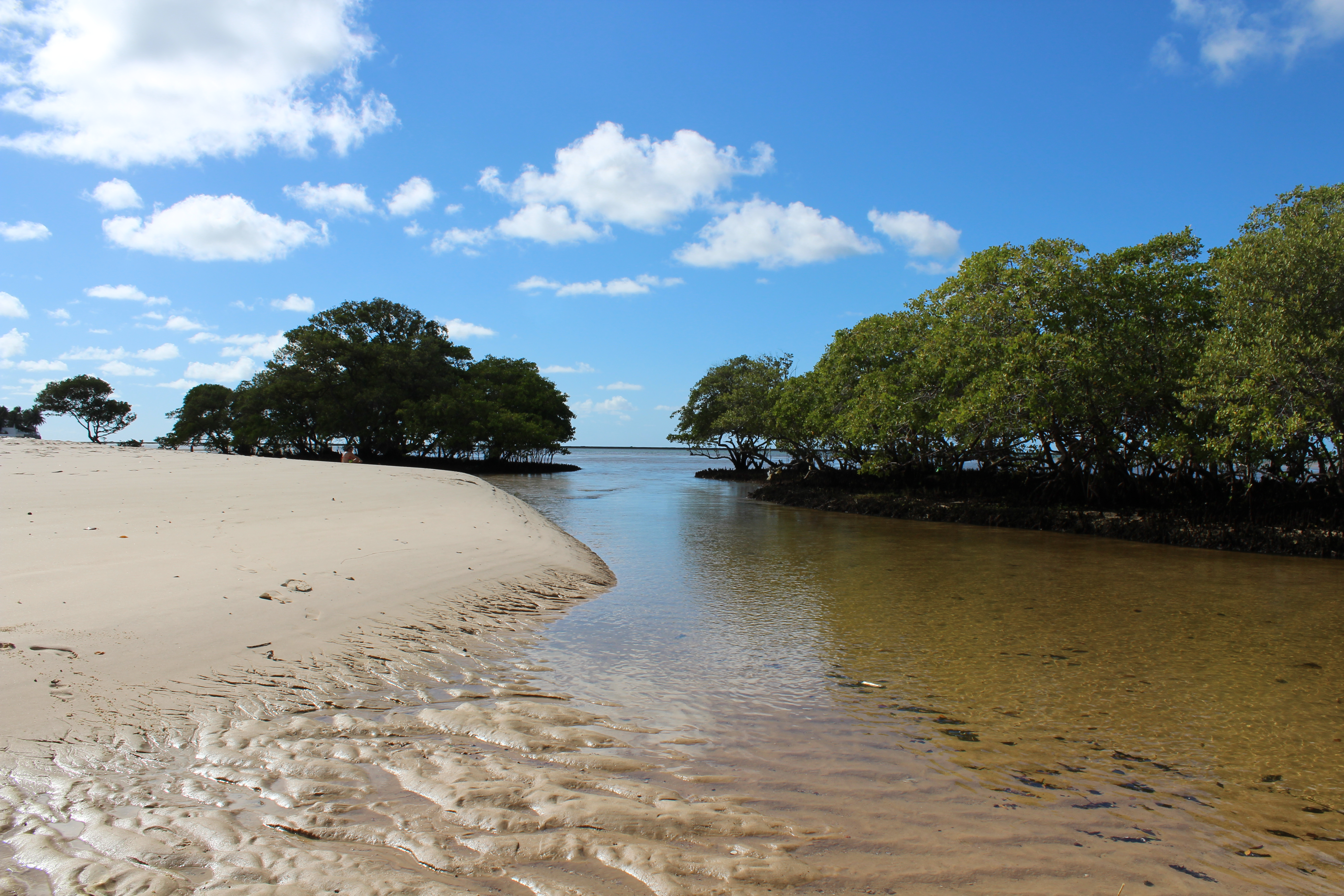
Mangroves in Barra de São Miguel

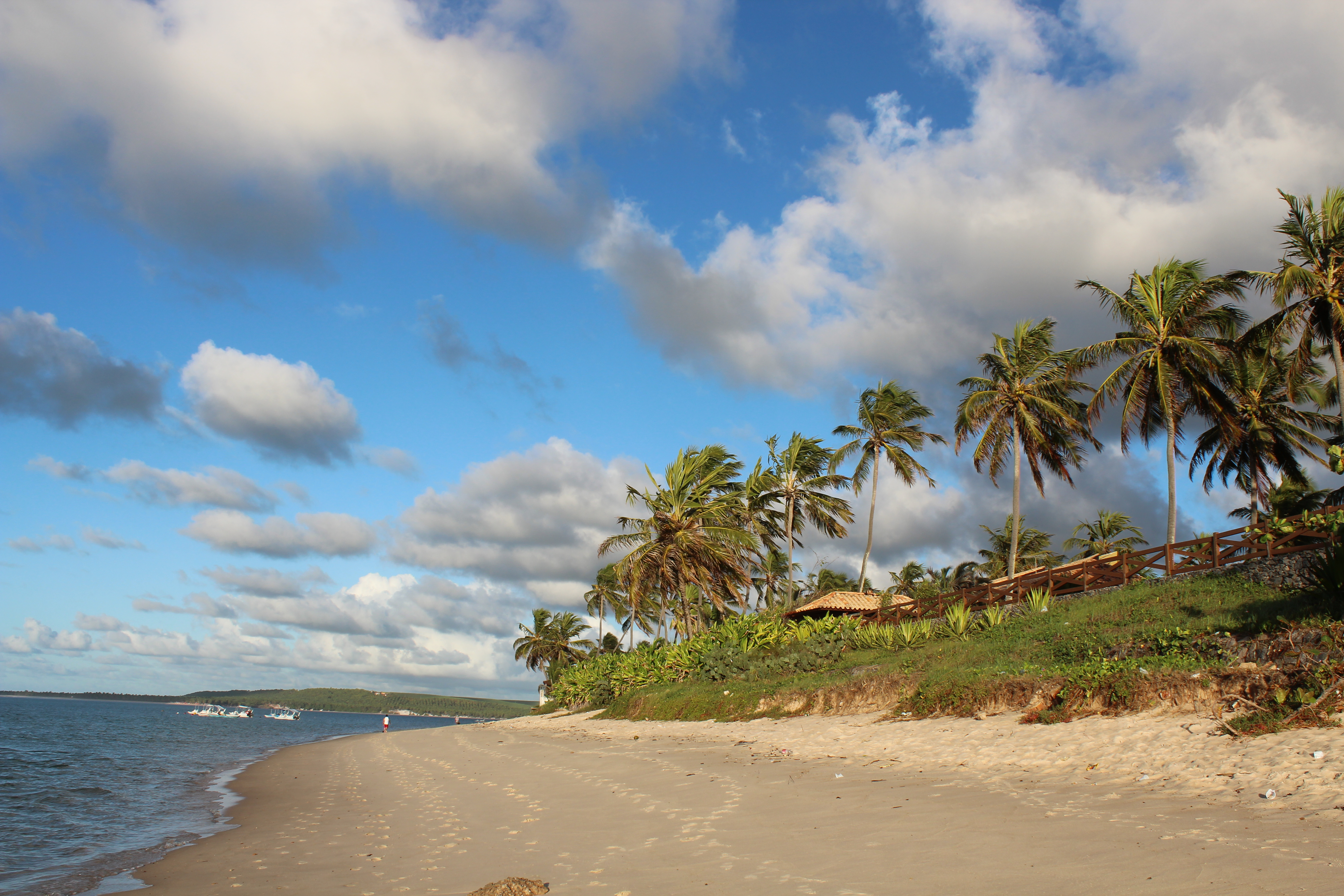
Beach in Barra de São Miguel

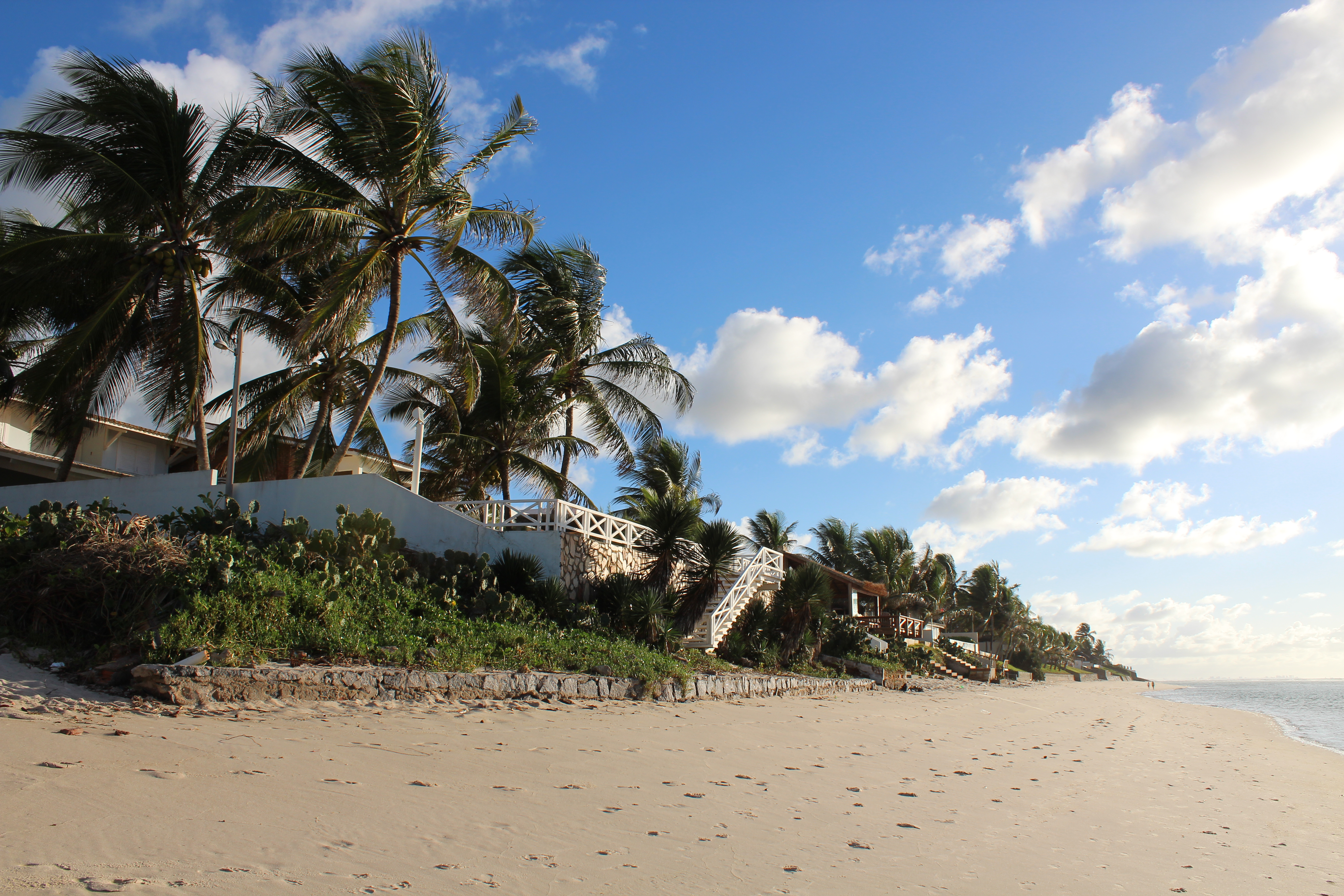
Beach in Barra de São Miguel

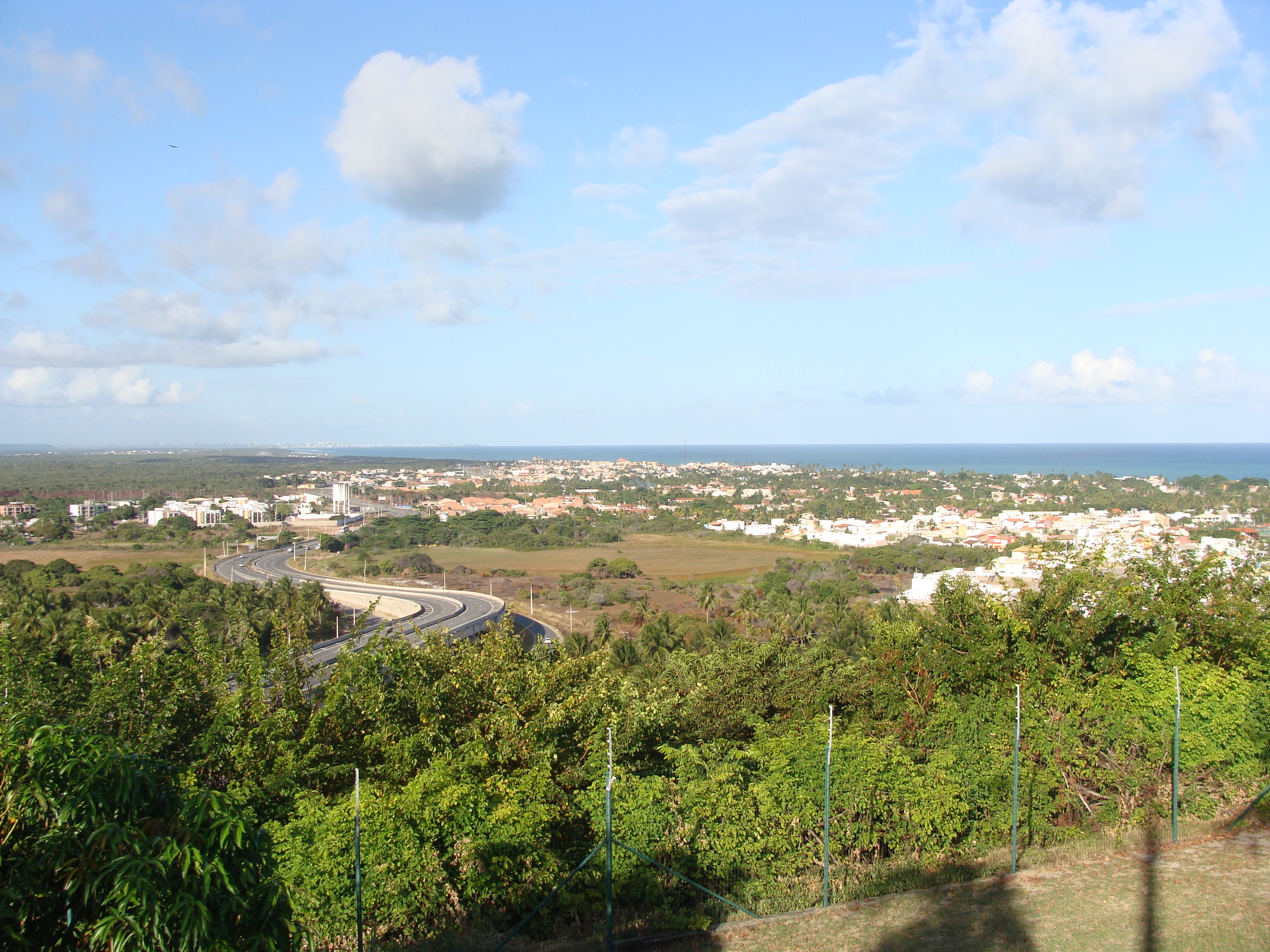
Aerial view of Barra de São Miguel

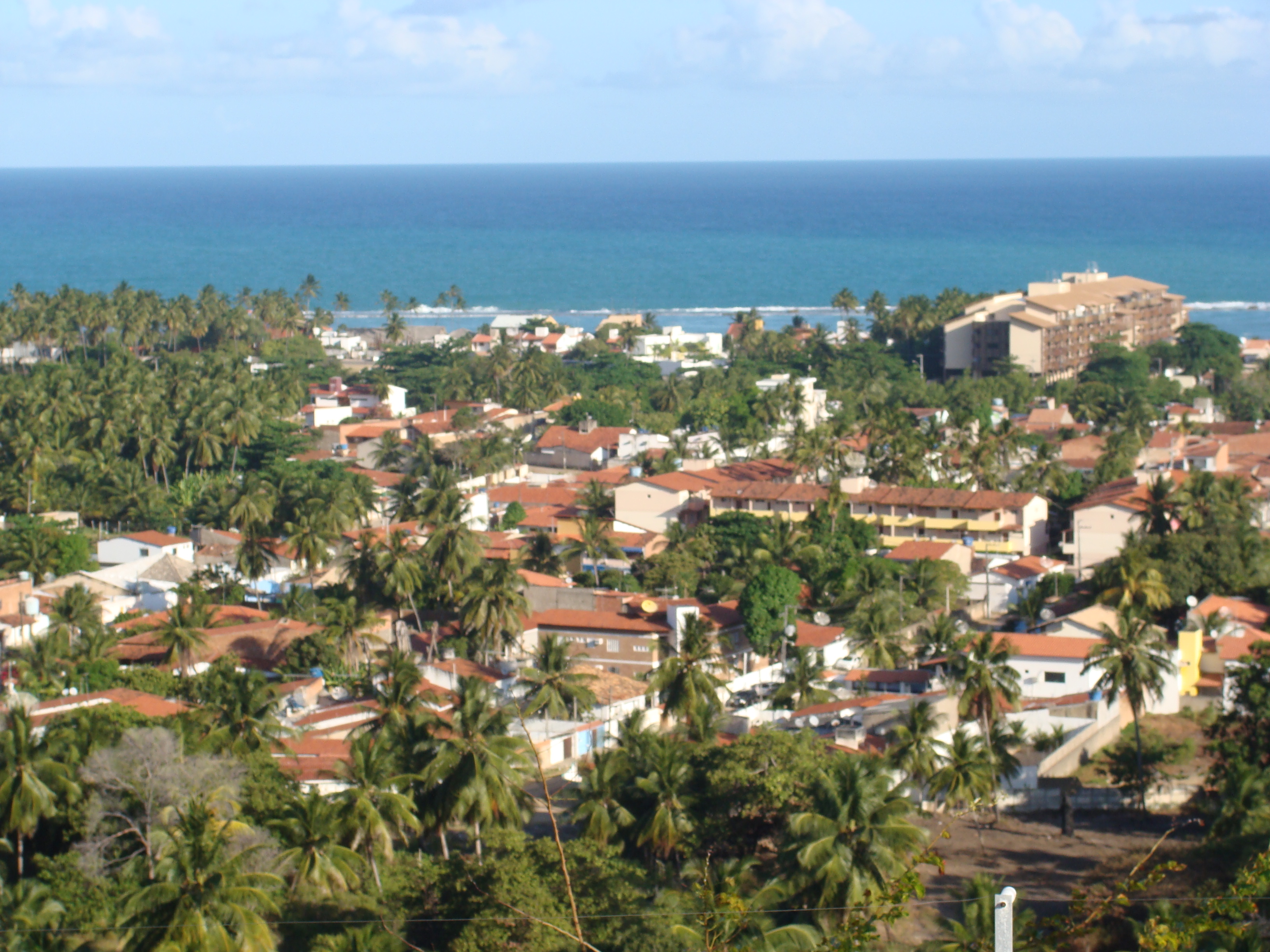
Aerial view of Barra de São Miguel

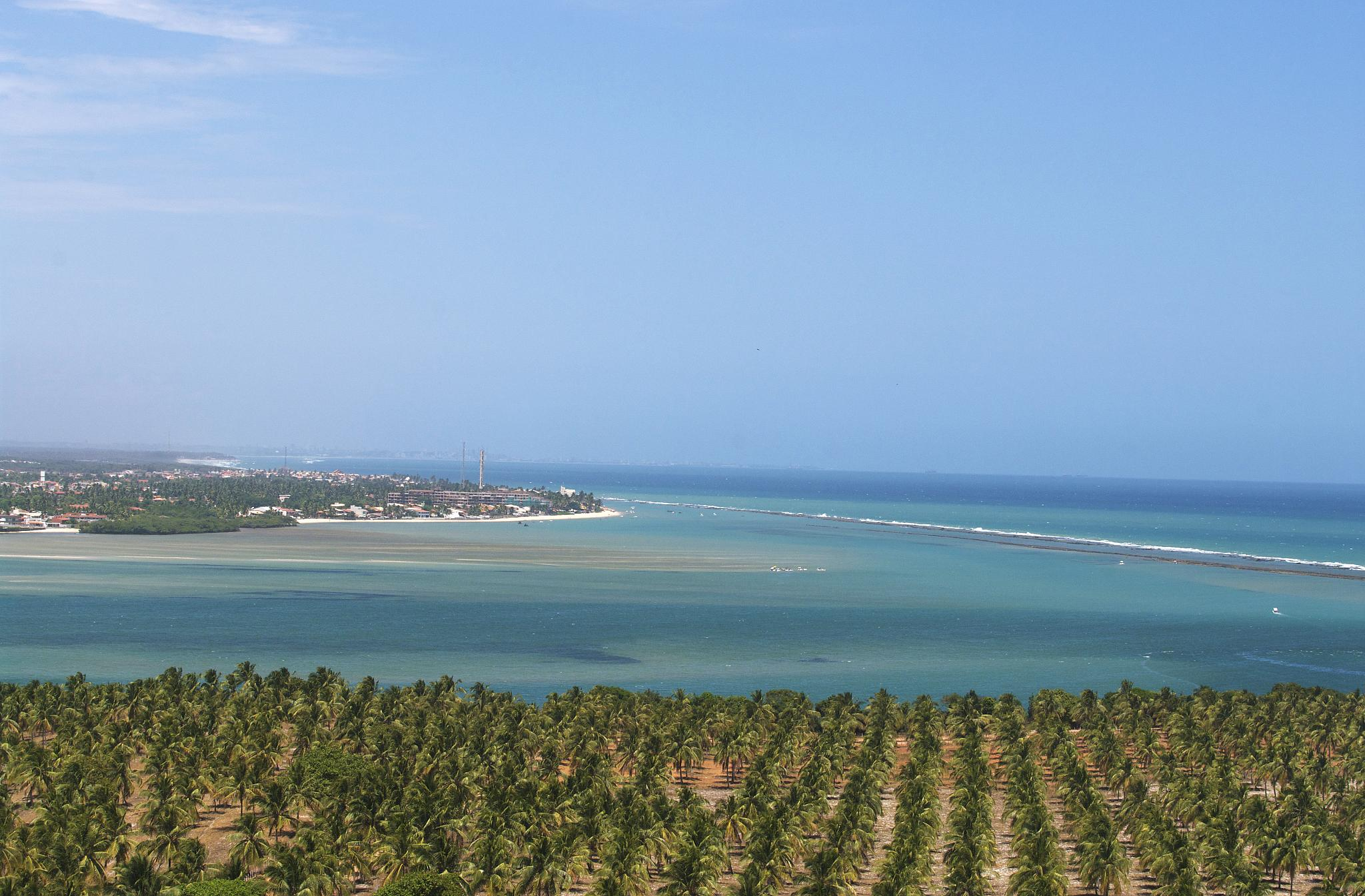
Aerial view of Barra de São Miguel across Roteiro Lagoon

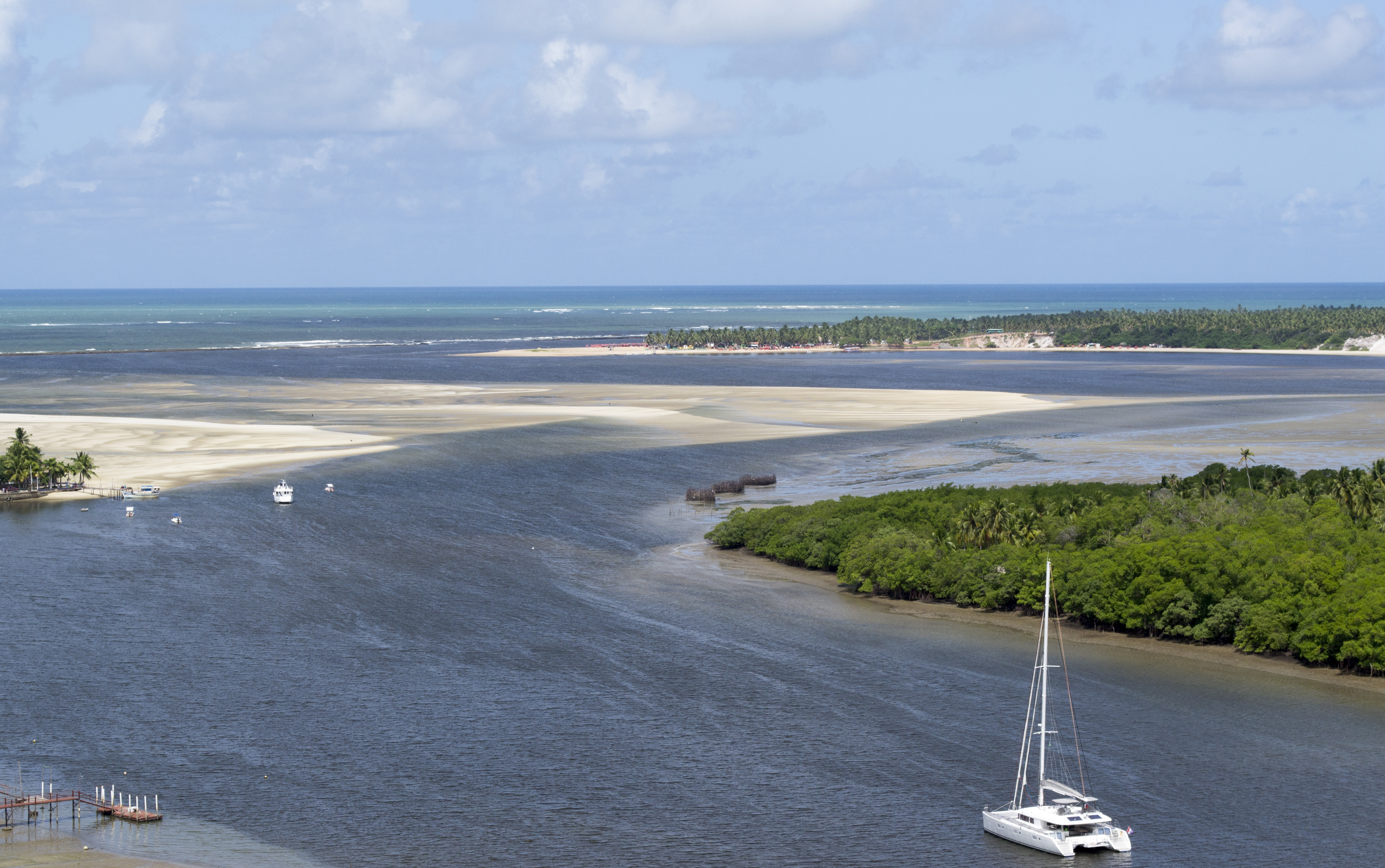
Roteiro Lagoon

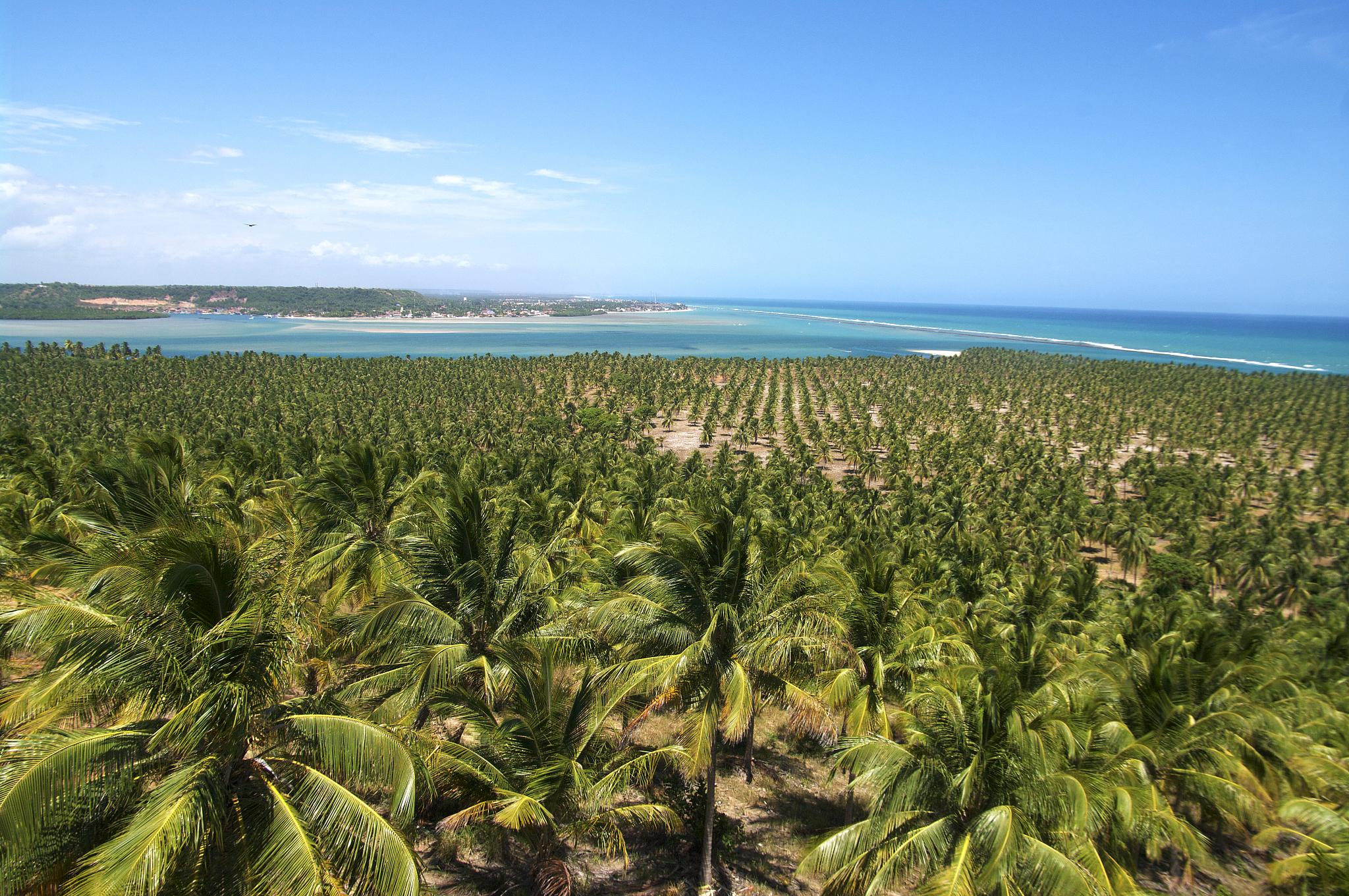
Aerial view of Barra de São Miguel across Roteiro Lagoon

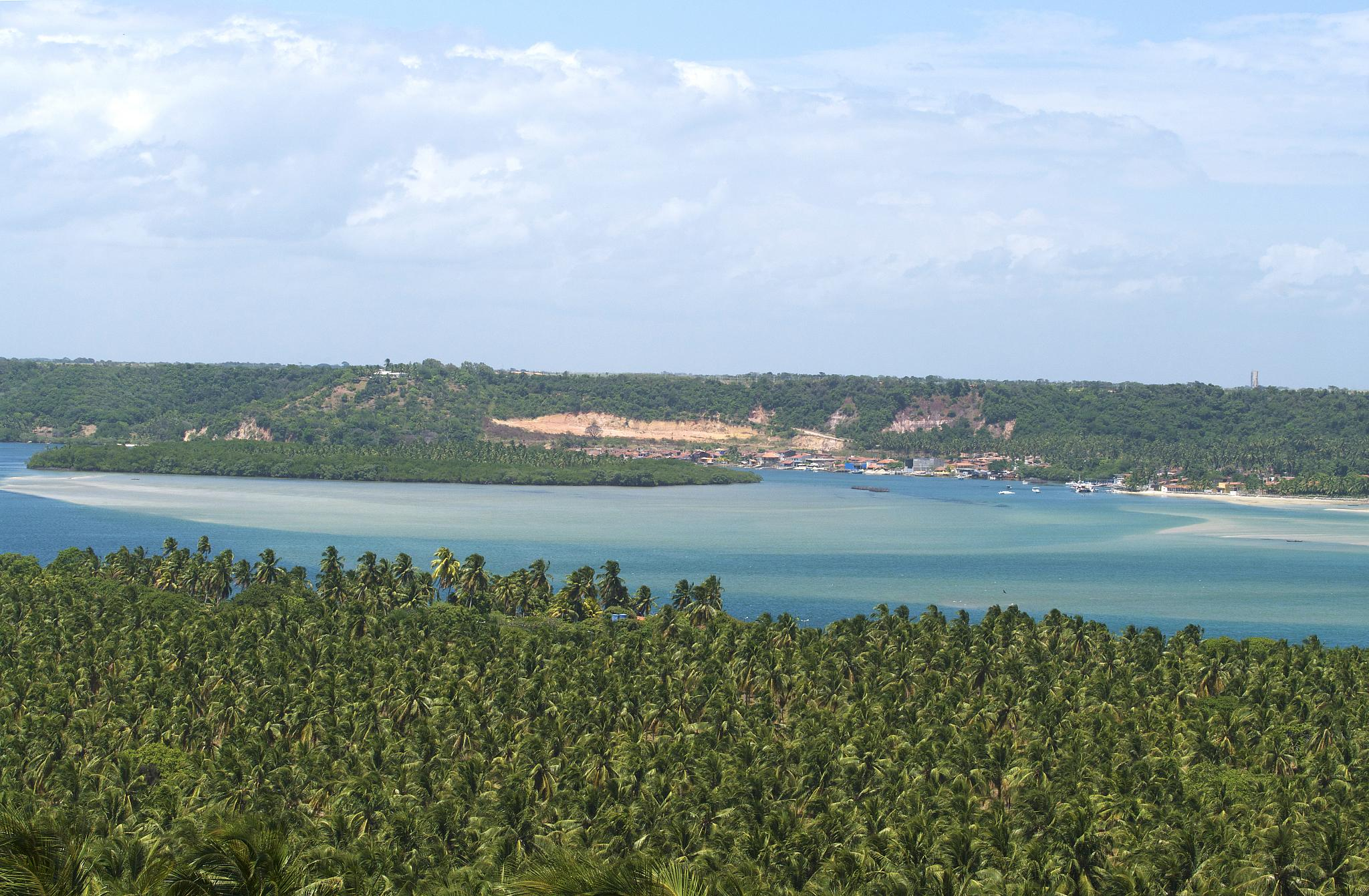
Aerial view of Barra de São Miguel across Roteiro Lagoon

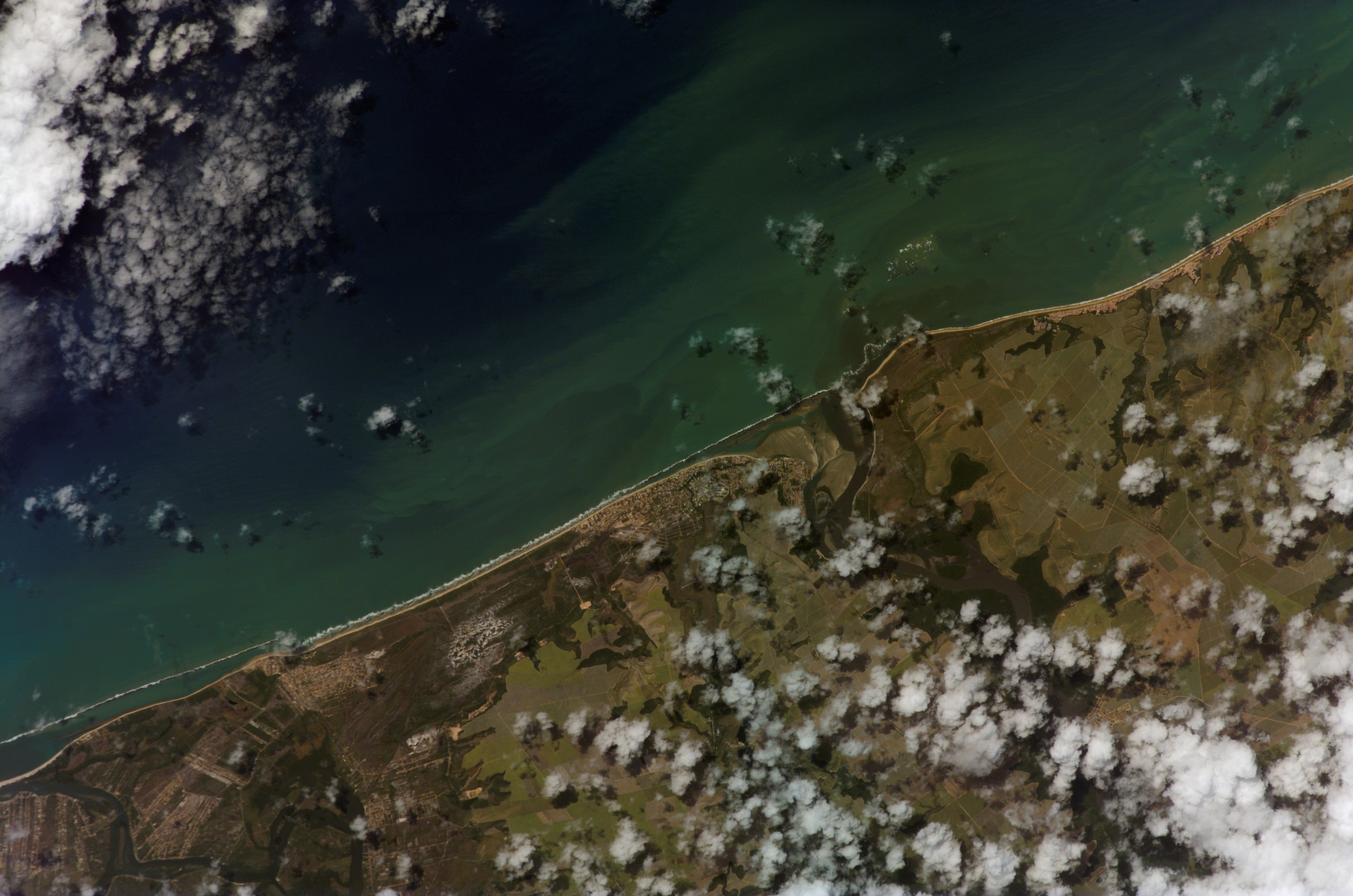
View of Barra de São Miguel from the International Space Station

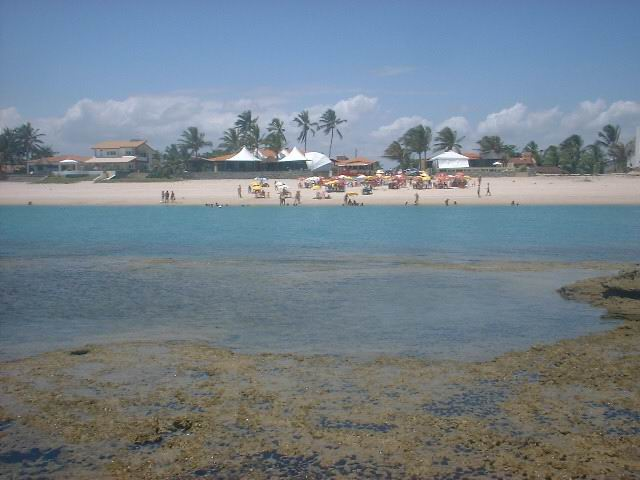
Beach in Barra de São Miguel

== See also ==
- List of municipalities in Alagoas
