= Nelson Meurer =

Brazilian politician (1942–2020)

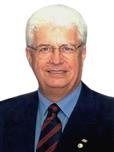

Mayor of Francisco Beltrão
- In office 1989–1993
- Preceded by: Guiomar Jesus Lopes
- Succeeded by: João Batista de Arruda

Member of the Chamber of Deputies from Paraná
- In office 1995–2019

Personal details
- Born: July 23, 1942 Bom Retiro, Santa Catarina, Brazil
- Died: July 12, 2020 (aged 77) Francisco Beltrão, Paraná, Brazil
- Party: Progressistas (PP)
- Other political affiliations: PDS (former)
- Profession: Politician, farmer

Nelson Meurer (23 July 1942 – 12 July 2020) was a Brazilian farmer and politician from the state of Santa Catarina who represented the state of Paraná at national level.

== Career ==
Before pursuing a career in politics, Meurer had very little formal education, never went to high school and worked as a farmer in Francisco Beltrão.

In 1988, Meurer was elected Mayor of Francisco Beltrão. His tenure went from 1989 to 1993.

In 1994, he was elected Member of the Chamber of Deputies representing the state of Paraná. His first term went from 1995 to 1999.

In 1998, he was re-elected as a Federal Deputy. His second tenure lasted between 1999 and 2003.

In 2002, he was elected for his third consecutive term at the Chamber of Deputies. This time he kept his post from 2003 to 2007.

In 2006, Meurer was again re-elected Federal Deputy. His fourth mandate went from 2007 to 2011.

In 2010, he was elected Federal Deputy for the fifth consecutive time and kept his post from 2011 to 2015.

In 2014, Meurer was elected for his sixth and last term at the Chamber of Deputies.

On 29 May 2018, Meurer was convicted by the Supreme Federal Court on Corruption and Money laundering charges. He was sentenced to 13 years and 9 months of incarceration.

== Death ==
On 12 July 2020, Meurer died in Francisco Beltrão at the age of 77, eleven days short from his 78th birthday, from complications brought on by COVID-19 during the COVID-19 pandemic in Brazil.
