= Canapi =

Municipality in Alagoas, Brazil

- Municipality of Alagoas, Brazil
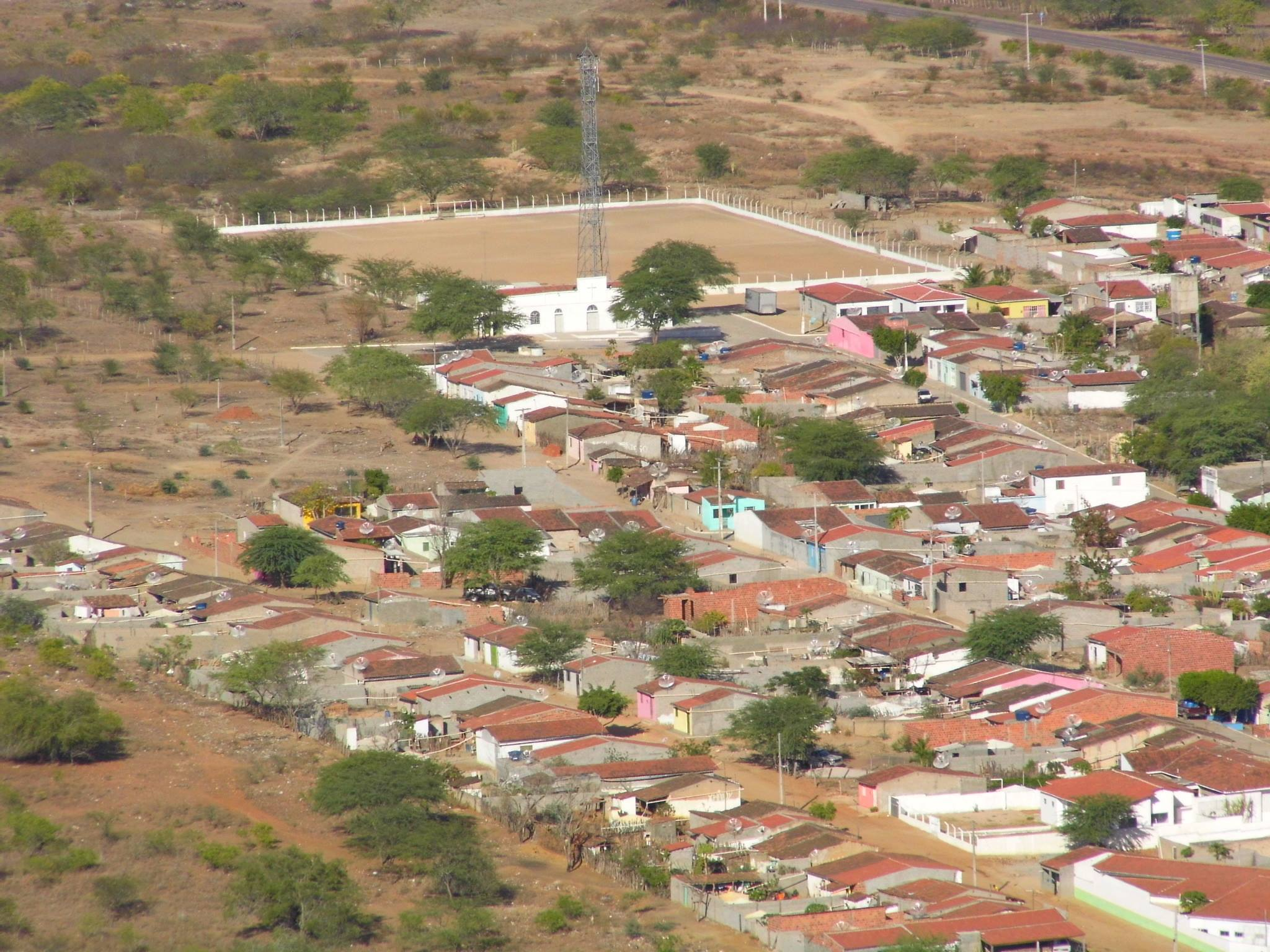
- Povoado Carié neighborhood

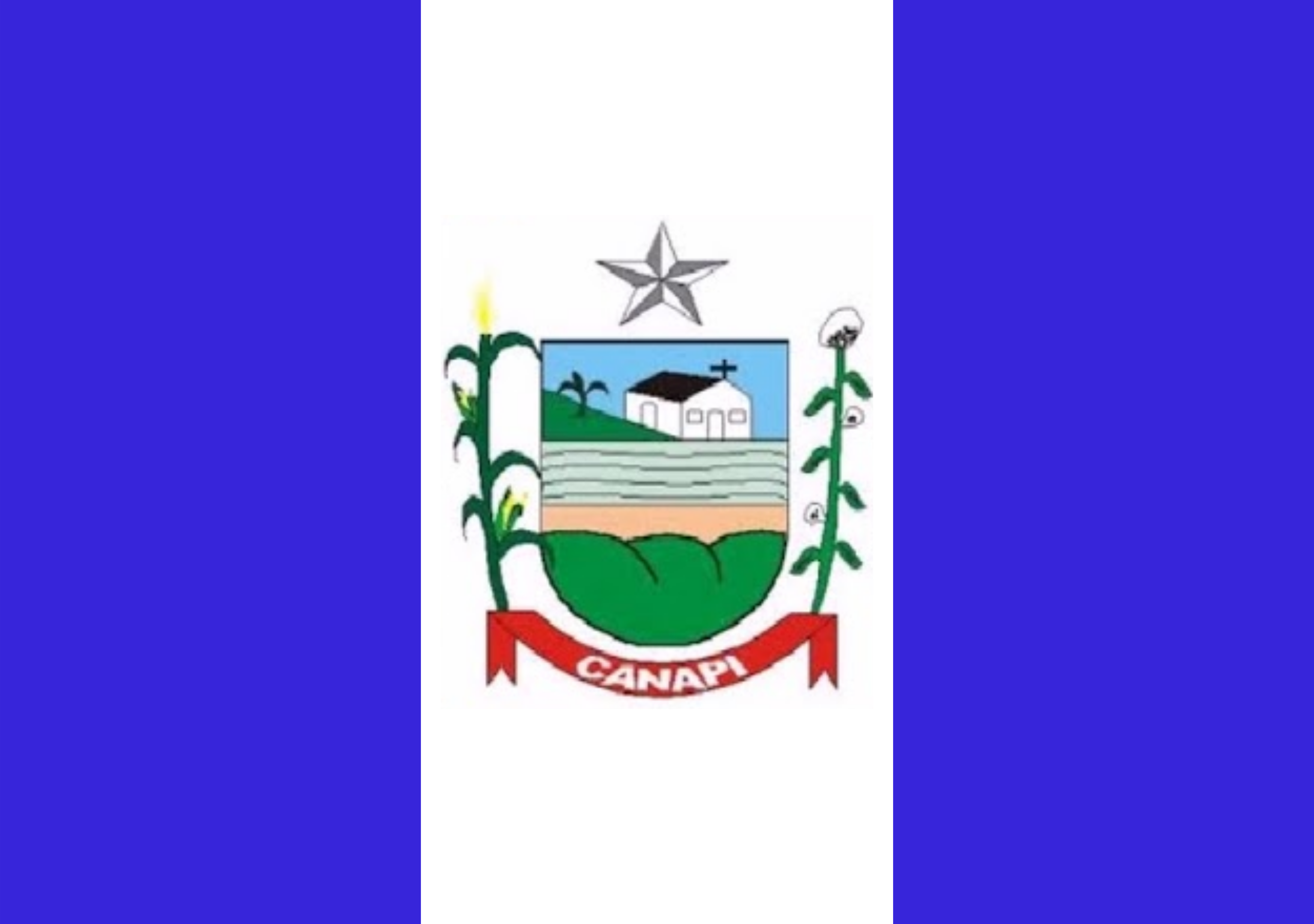
- Flag

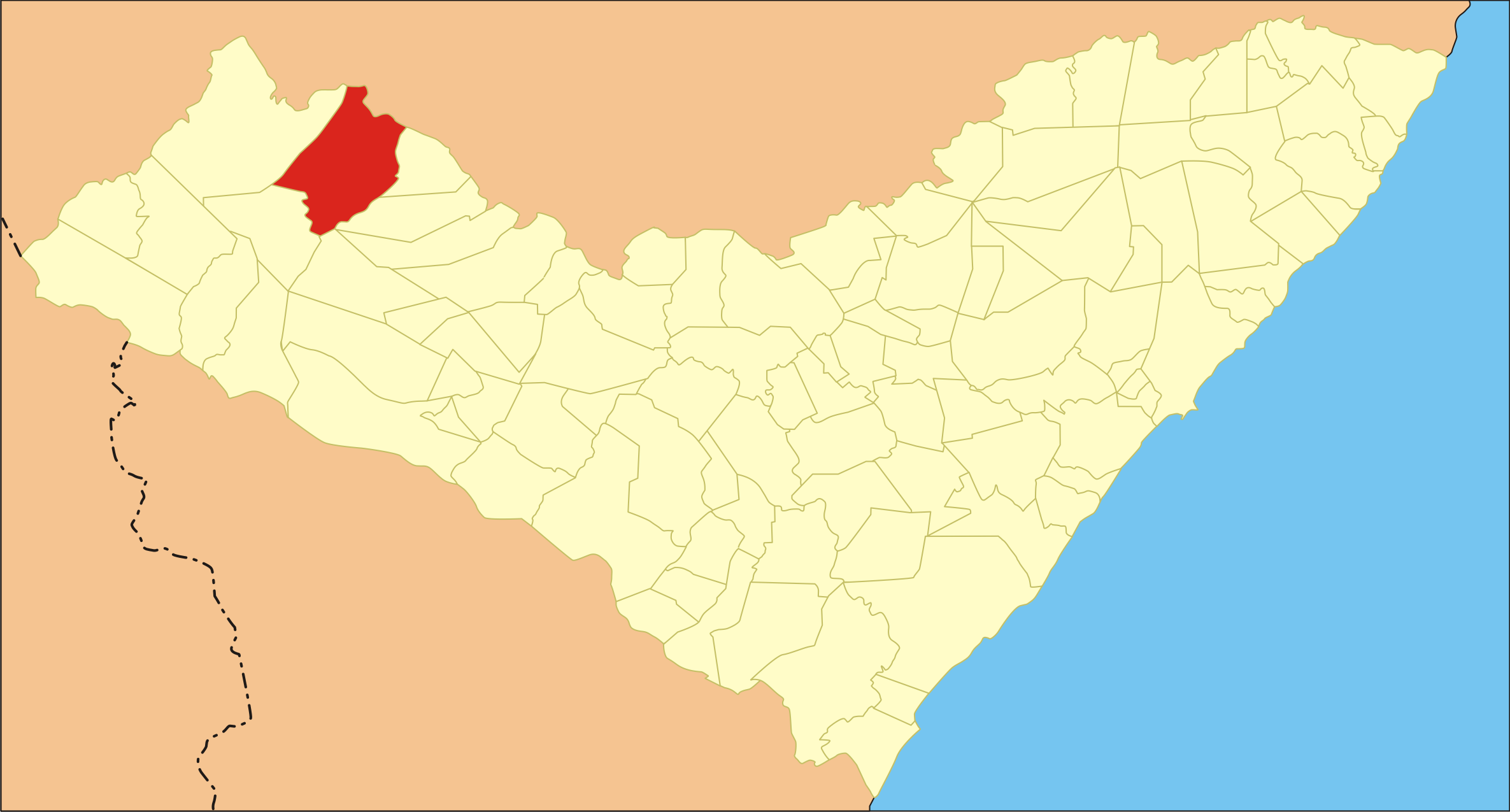
- Location of Canapi in Alagoas

- Location within Brazil Location within South America
- Coordinates: 9°7′5″S 37°36′18″W
- Country: Brazil
- Region: Northeast
- State: Alagoas
- Founded: 22 August 1962

Government
  - Mayor: Josélia Melo de Lima (PP) (2025-2028)
  - Vice Mayor: Hermeson Melo de Lima (PP) (2025-2028)

Area
  - Total: 602.778 km^{2} (232.734 sq mi)
- Elevation: 330 m (1,080 ft)

Population (2022)
  - Total: 15,559
  - Density: 25.81/km^{2} (66.8/sq mi)
- Demonym: Canapiense (Brazilian Portuguese)
- Time zone: UTC-03:00 (Brasília Time)
- Postal code: 57530-000
- HDI (2010): 0.506 – low
- Website: canapi.al.gov.br

Canapi (Central northeastern portuguese pronunciation: [kɐnɐˈpi]) is a municipality located in the Brazilian state of Alagoas. Its population is 17,719 (2020) and its area is 572 km^{2} (221 sq mi).

== Gallery ==
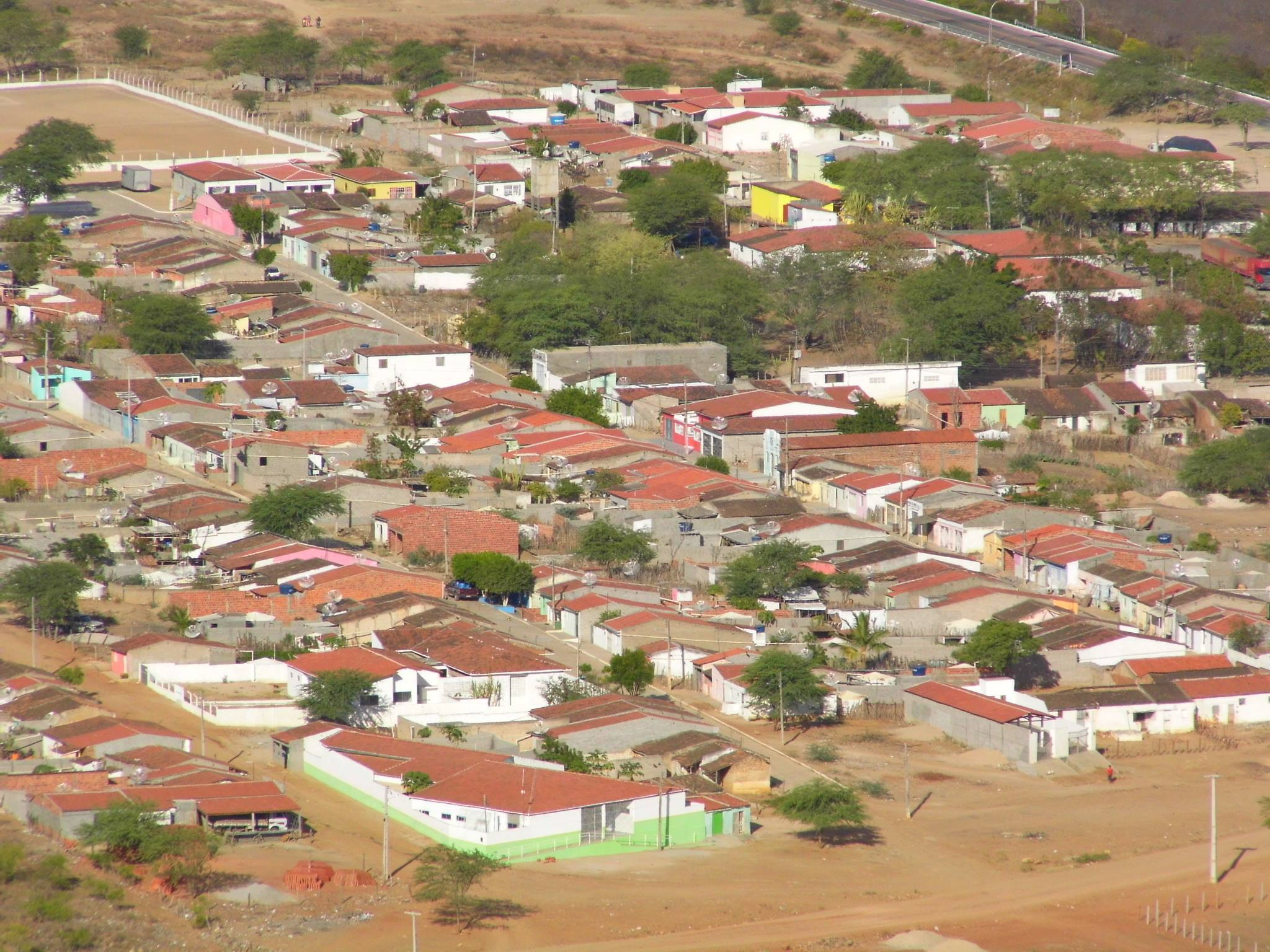
Povoado Carié neighborhood

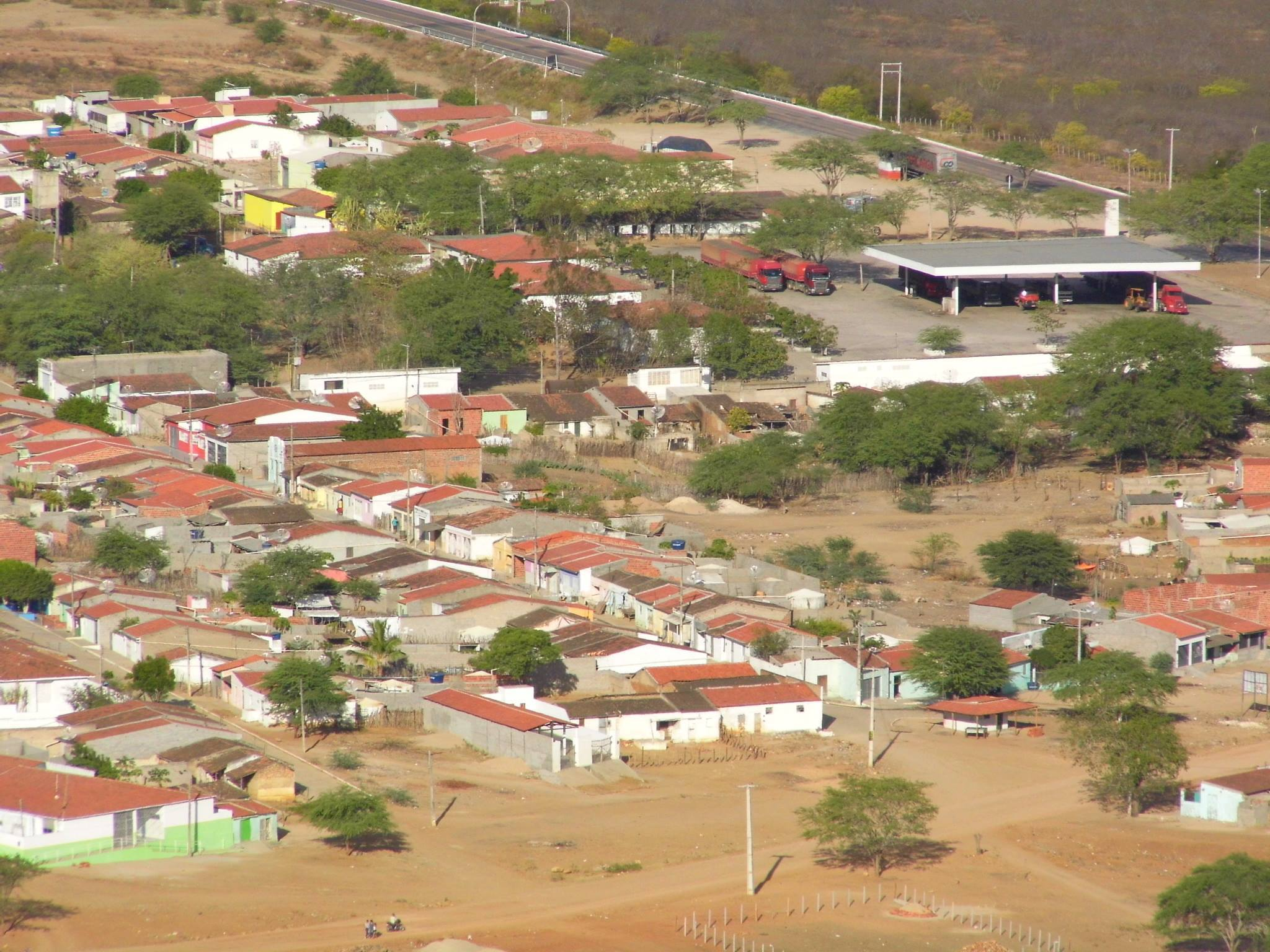
Povoado Carié neighborhood

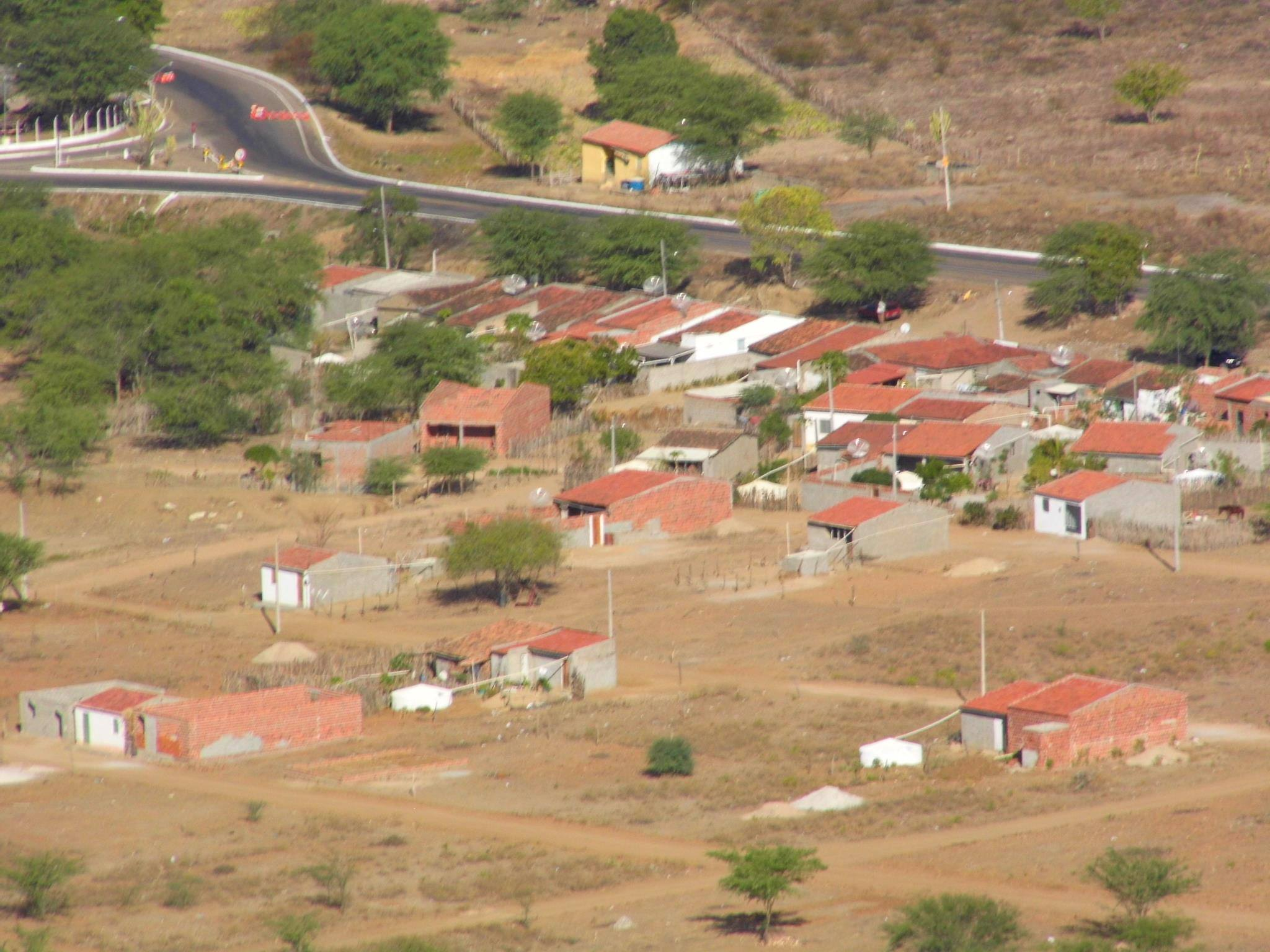
Povoado Carié neighborhood

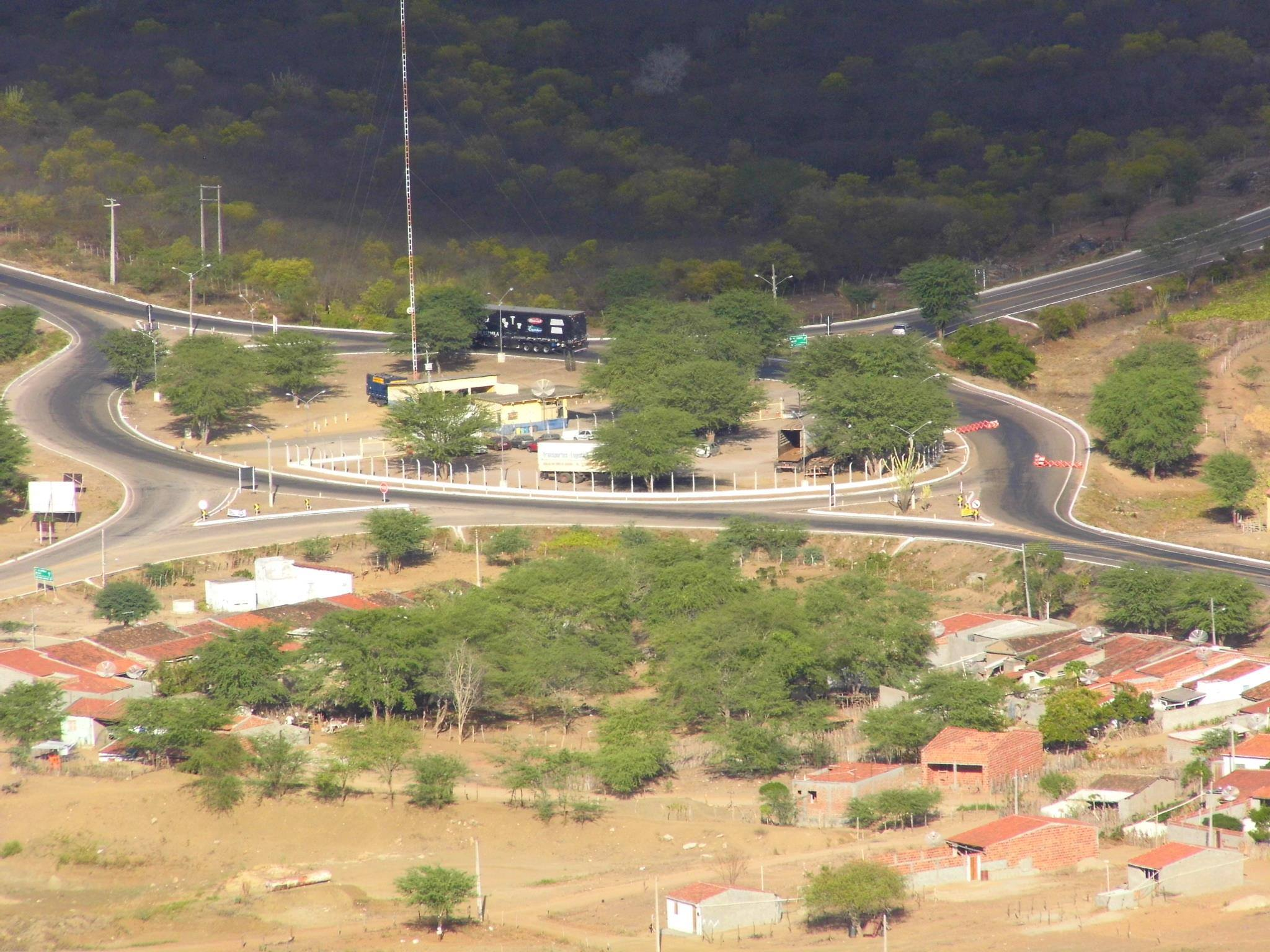
Intersection between Federal Highway 316 (BR-316) and Federal Highway 423 (BR-423)

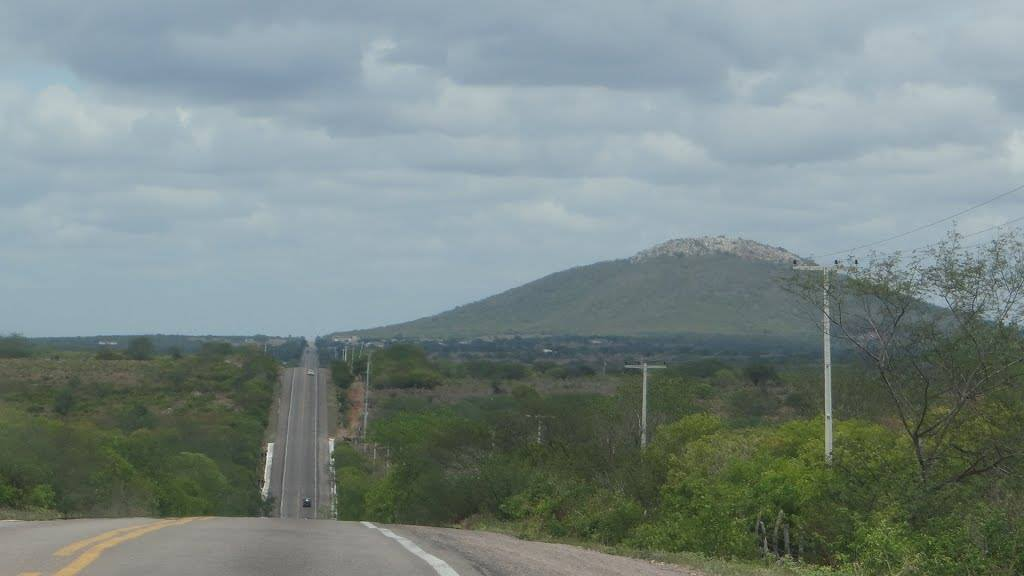
Serra of Povoado

== See also ==
- List of municipalities in Alagoas
