= Roteiro, Alagoas =

Municipality in Alagoas, Brazil

Roteiro
- Municipality of Alagoas, Brazil } image_flag = Bandeira de Roteiro Alagoas.png
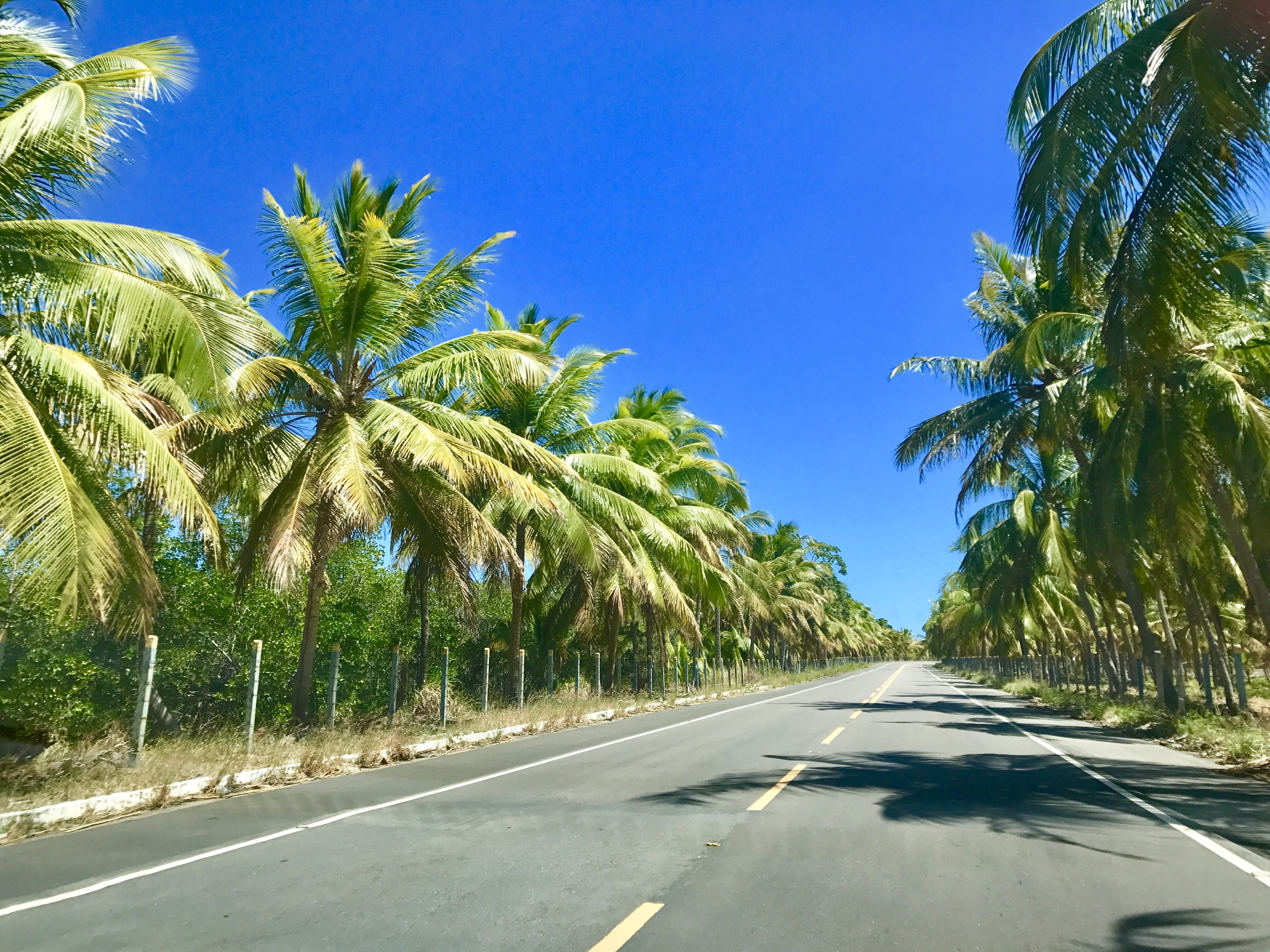
- AL-101 in Roteiro

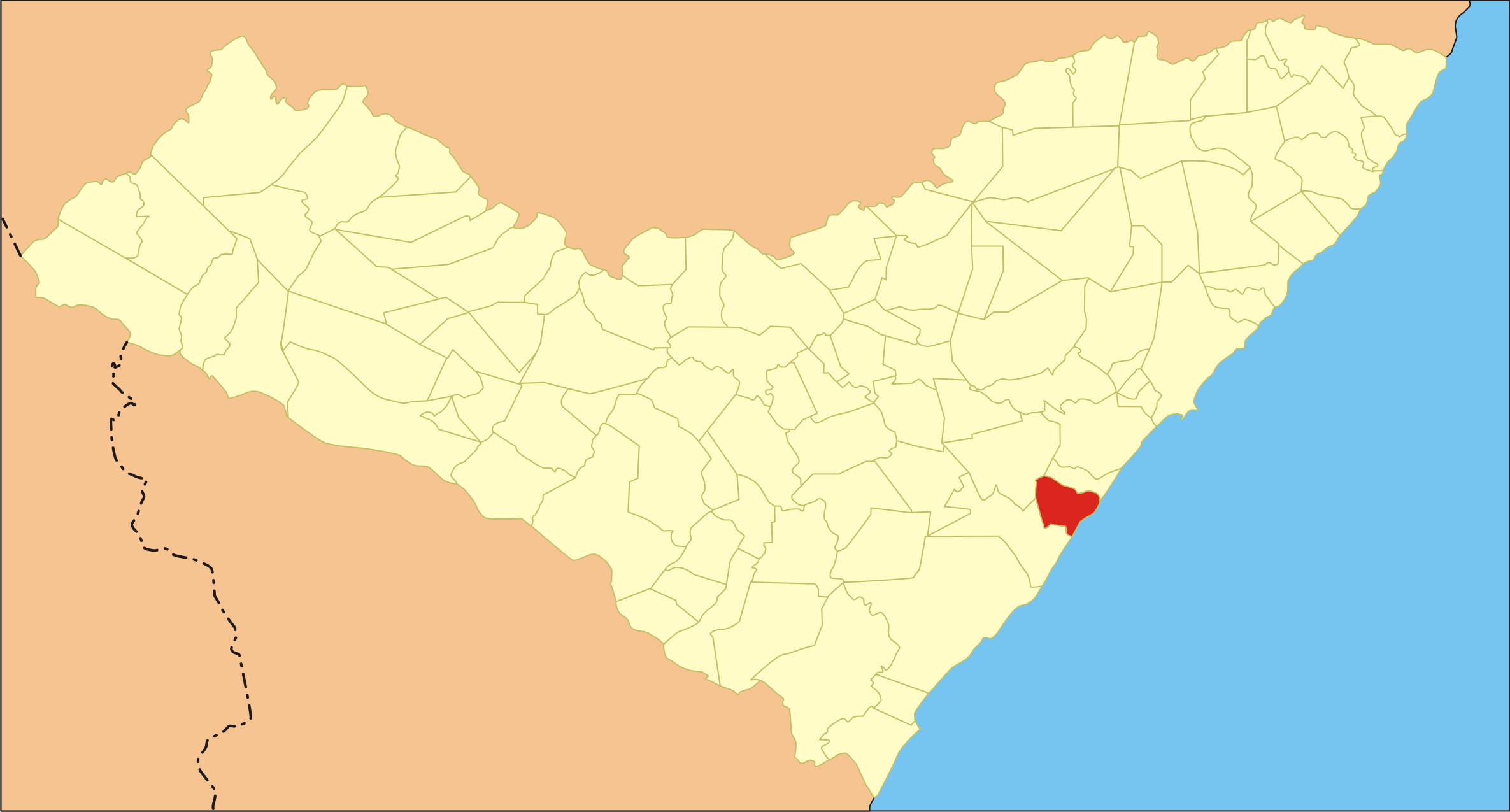
- Location of Roteiro in Alagoas

- Location within Brazil Location within South America
- Coordinates: 9°49′58″S 35°58′40″W
- Country: Brazil
- Region: Northeast
- State: Alagoas
- Founded: 18 December 1963

Government
  - Mayor: Paulo José Leite Teixeira (MDB) (2025-2028)
  - Vice Mayor: Eronildes Cândido do Nascimento (MDB) (2025-2028)

Area
  - Total: 128.838 km^{2} (49.745 sq mi)
- Elevation: 17 m (56 ft)

Population (2022)
  - Total: 6,474
  - Density: 50.21/km^{2} (130.0/sq mi)
- Demonym: Roteirense (Brazilian Portuguese)
- Time zone: UTC-03:00 (Brasília Time)
- Postal code: 57246-000, 57257-000
- HDI (2010): 0.505 – low
- Website: roteiro.al.gov.br

Roteiro (Central northeastern portuguese pronunciation: [hoˈteɾʊ]) is a municipality located in the Brazilian state of Alagoas. Its population was 6,649 (2020) and its area is 129 km^{2} (50 sq mi).

== See also ==
- List of municipalities in Alagoas
