= Paulo Jacinto =

Municipality of Alagoas, Brazil

- Municipality of Alagoas, Brazil
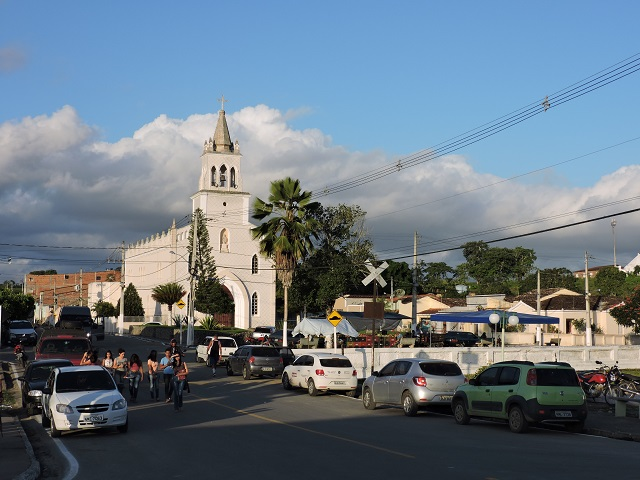
- Parish Church of Our Lady of Graces

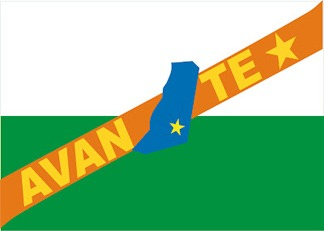
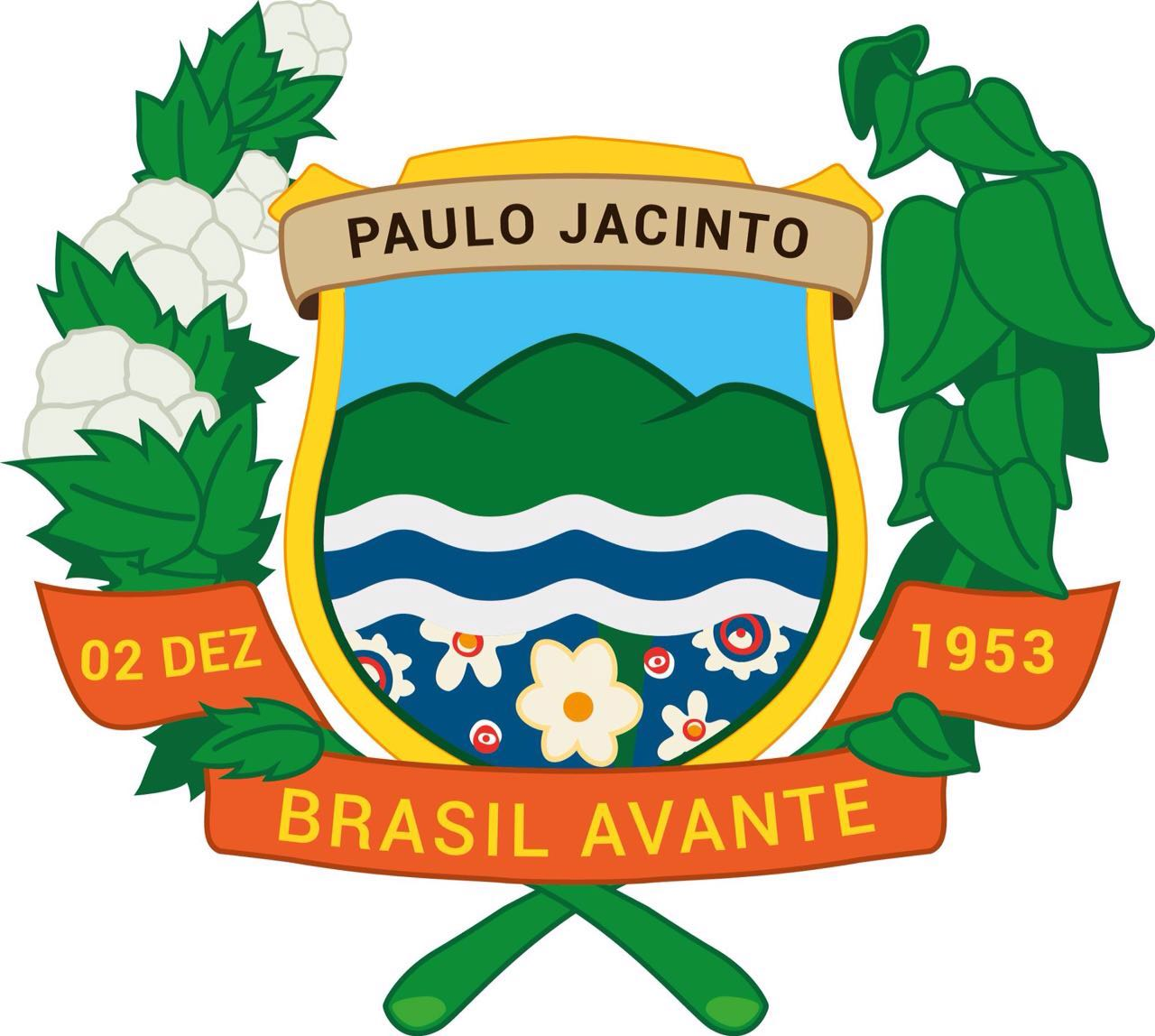
- Flag Coat of arms

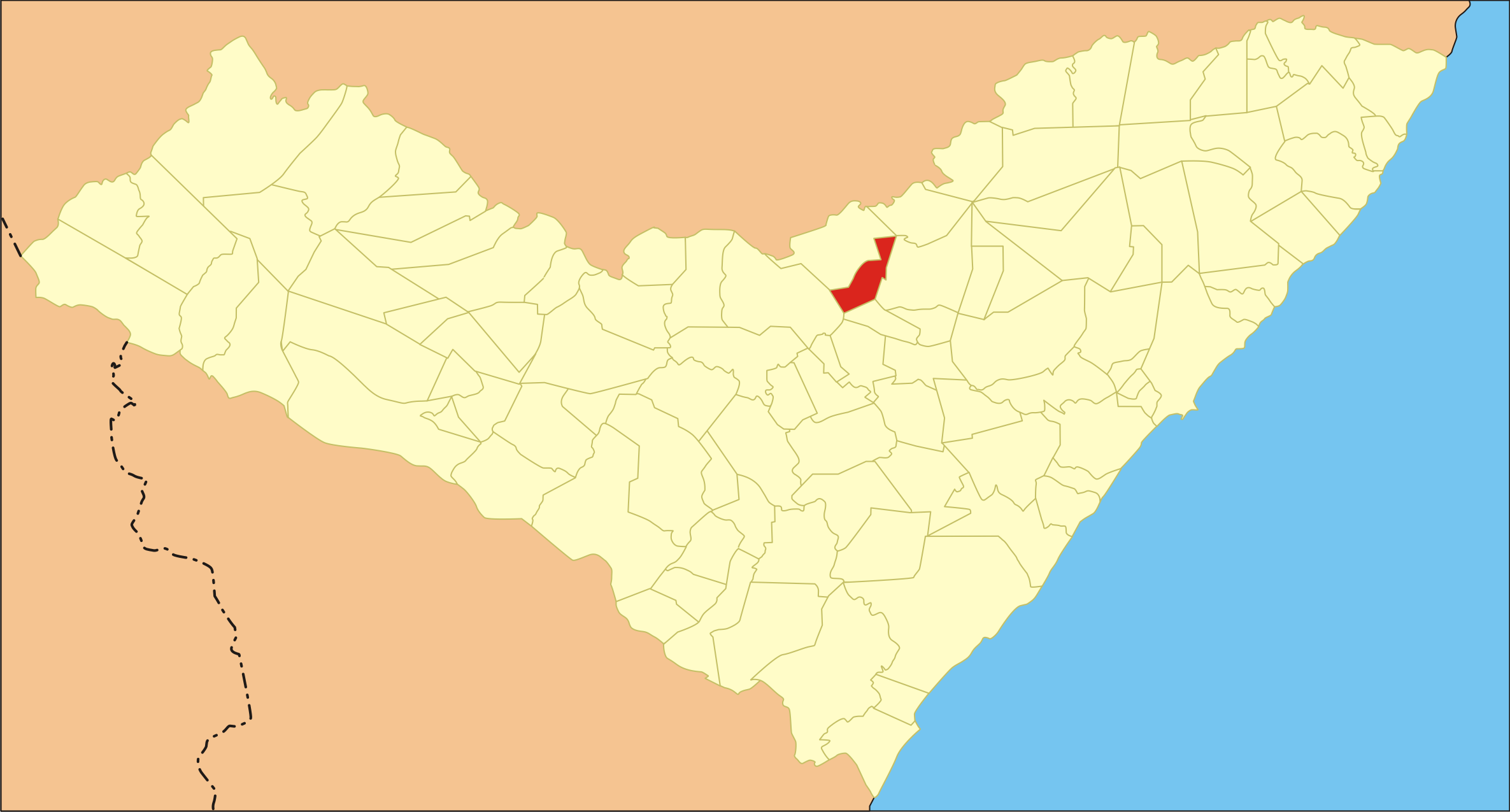
- Location of Paulo Jacinto in Alagoas

- Location within Brazil Location within South America
- Coordinates: 09°21′57″S 36°22′12″W
- Country: Brazil
- Region: Northeast
- State: Alagoas
- Founded: 2 December 1953

Government
  - Mayor: Francisco Manoel Ferreira Fontan (PP) (2025-2028)
  - Vice Mayor: Maria Zilda de Assunção Tenório (PL) (2025-2028)

Area
  - Total: 118.457 km^{2} (45.737 sq mi)
- Elevation: 274 m (899 ft)

Population (2022)
  - Total: 6,576
  - Density: 55.51/km^{2} (143.8/sq mi)
- Demonym: Paulo-jacintense (Brazilian Portuguese)
- Time zone: UTC-03:00 (Brasília Time)
- Postal Code: 57740-000
- HDI (2010): 0.589 – medium
- Website: paulojacinto.al.gov.br

Paulo Jacinto (Central northeastern portuguese pronunciation: [ˈpɐwlʊ ʒɐˈsĩtu]) is a municipality located in the center of the Brazilian state of Alagoas. Its population is 7,560 (2020) and its area is 108 km^{2} (42 sq mi).

== See also ==
- List of municipalities in Alagoas
