= Coité do Nóia =

Municipality of Alagoas, Brazil

Coité do Noia
- Municipality
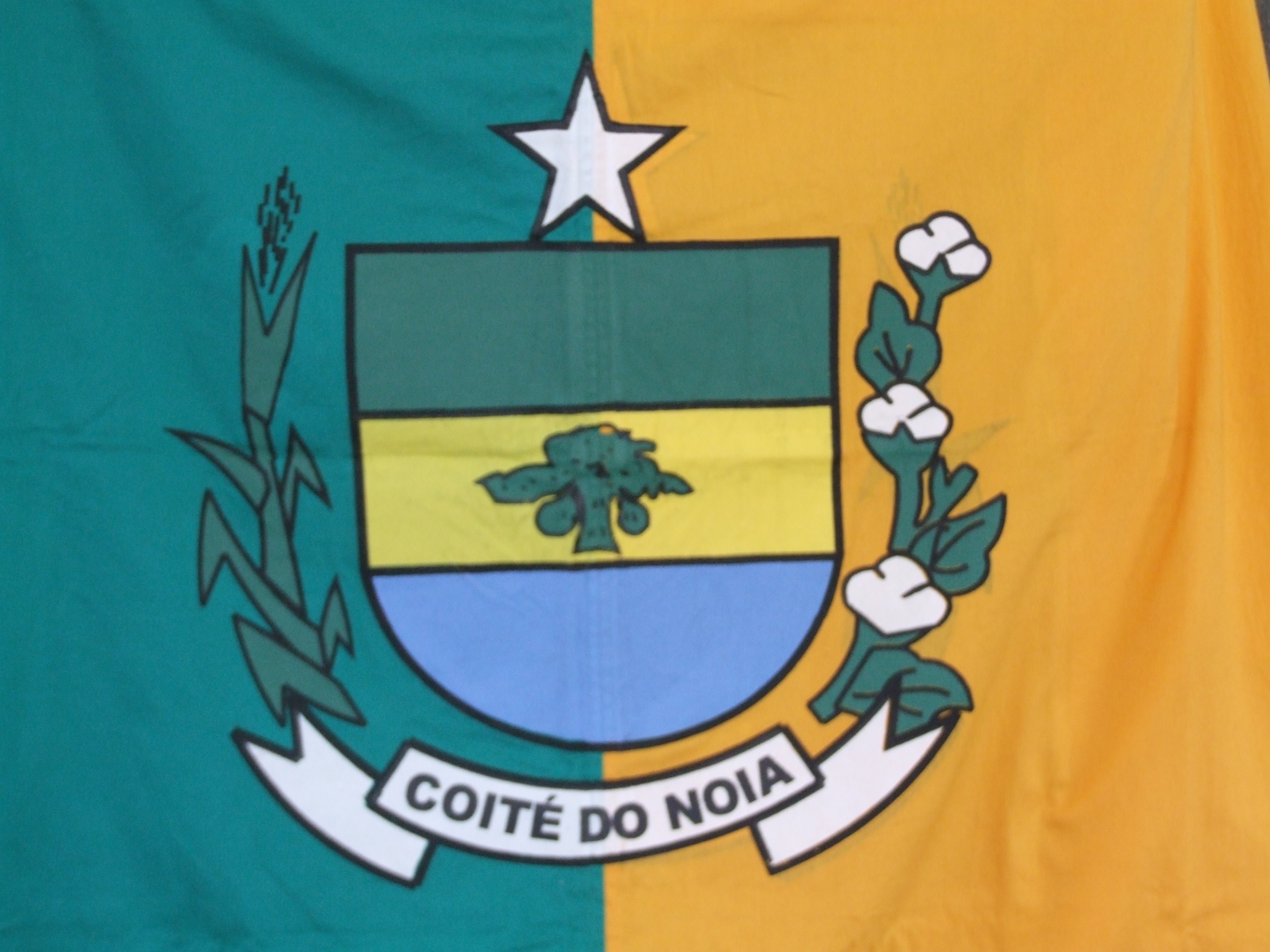
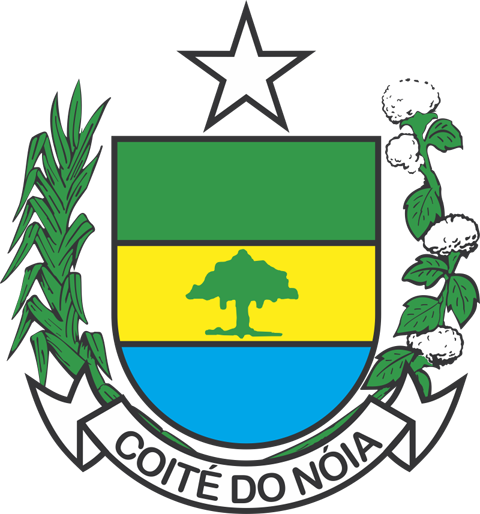
- Flag Coat of arms

- Location within Brazil
- Coordinates: 9°37′55″S 36°34′44″W
- Country: Brazil
- State: Alagoas
- Mesoregion: Agreste Alagoano
- Microregion: Arapiraca

Government
  - Mayor: Bueno Higino

Area
  - Total: 88.759 km^{2} (34.270 sq mi)

Population (2020 est)
  - Total: 10,643
  - Density: 119.91/km^{2} (310.56/sq mi)
- Time zone: UTC−3 (BRT)

Coité do Noia (Central northeastern portuguese pronunciation: [koˈtʃɛ ˈdʊ ˈnɔjɐ]) is a municipality located in the center of the Brazilian state of Alagoas.
