= Poço das Trincheiras =

Municipality in Alagoas, Brazil

- Municipality of Alagoas, Brazil
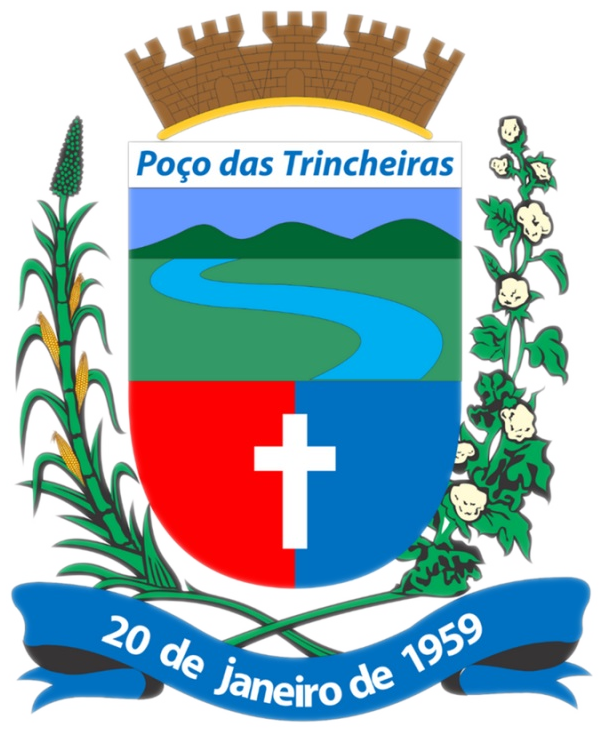
- Coat of arms
- Etymology: In English "Well of the Trenches", referring to a well which existed in the area and stone trenches built in the area to defend from possible Dutch attacks
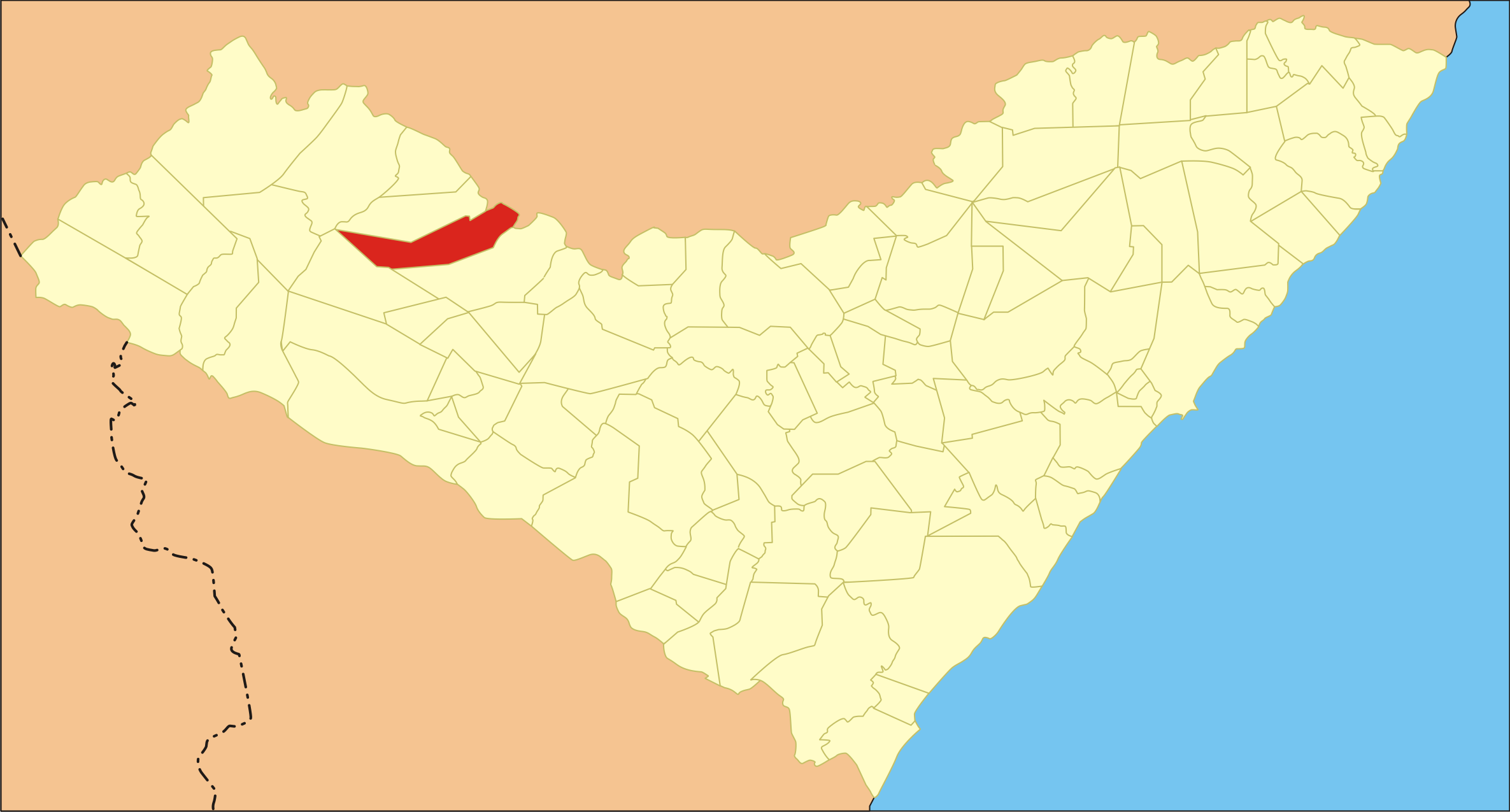
- Location of Poço das Trincheiras in Alagoas

- Location within Brazil Location within South America
- Coordinates: 9°18′33″S 37°17′9″W
- Country: Brazil
- Region: Northeast
- State: Alagoas
- Founded: 20 January 1959

Government
  - Mayor: Jose Valmiro Gomes da Costa (MDB) (2025-2028)
  - Vice Mayor: Jose Erivan Ramos da Silva (MDB) (2025-2028)

Area
  - Total: 284.526 km^{2} (109.856 sq mi)
- Elevation: 294 m (965 ft)

Population (2022)
  - Total: 12,518
  - Density: 44.04/km^{2} (114.1/sq mi)
- Demonym: Pocense (Brazilian Portuguese)
- Time zone: UTC-03:00 (Brasília Time)
- Postal code: 57510-000
- HDI (2010): 0.526 – low
- Website: pocodastrincheiras.al.gov.br

Poço das Trincheiras (Central northeastern portuguese pronunciation: [ˈposu ˈdɐɦ tɾĩˈʃeɾɐ]) is a municipality located in the western of the Brazilian state of Alagoas. Its population was 14,418 (2020) and its area is 303 km^{2} (117 sq mi).

== See also ==
- List of municipalities in Alagoas
