= Santana do Mundaú =

Municipality in Alagoas, Brazil

- Municipality of Alagoas, Brazil
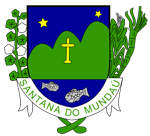
- Flag Coat of arms

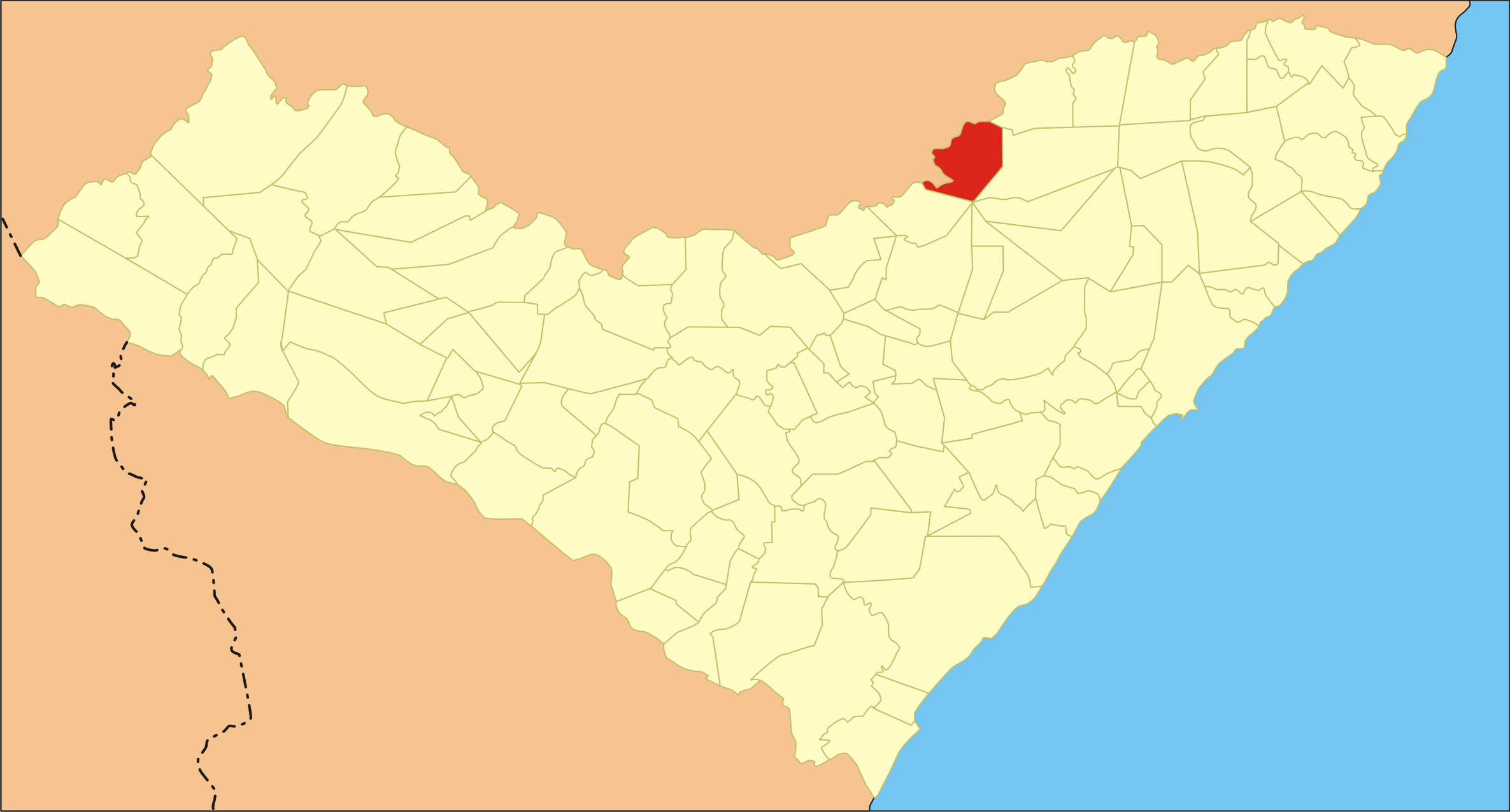
- Location of Santana do Mundaú in Alagoas

- Location within Brazil Location within South America
- Coordinates: 9°10′4″S 36°13′19″W
- Country: Brazil
- Region: Northeast
- State: Alagoas
- Founded: 14 June 1960

Government
  - Mayor: André Luiz Goes Castro (MDB) (2025-2028)
  - Vice Mayor: Tarcisio de Morais Araujo (MDB) (2025-2028)

Area
  - Total: 232.169 km^{2} (89.641 sq mi)
- Elevation: 221 m (725 ft)

Population (2022)
  - Total: 11,323
  - Density: 48.77/km^{2} (126.3/sq mi)
- Demonym: Mundauense (Brazilian Portuguese)
- Time zone: UTC-03:00 (Brasília Time)
- Postal code: 57840-000, 57850-000
- HDI (2010): 0.519 – low
- Website: santanadomundau.al.gov.br

Santana do Mundaú (Central northeastern portuguese pronunciation: [sɐ̃ˈtɐ̃nɐ ˈdu mũdɐˈuː]) is a municipality located in the Brazilian state of Alagoas. Its population peaked at 11,235 in 2005 and was 10,687 in 2020. Its area is 224 square kilometres (86 sq mi).

== See also ==
- List of municipalities in Alagoas
