= Ouro Branco, Alagoas =

Municipality in Alagoas, Brazil

Ouro Branco
- Municipality
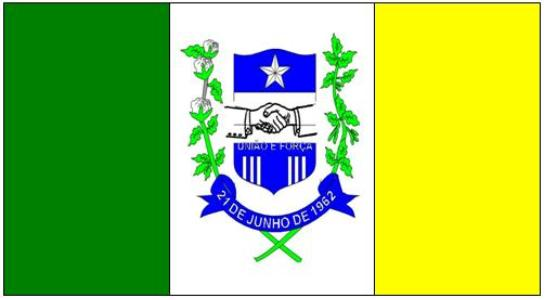
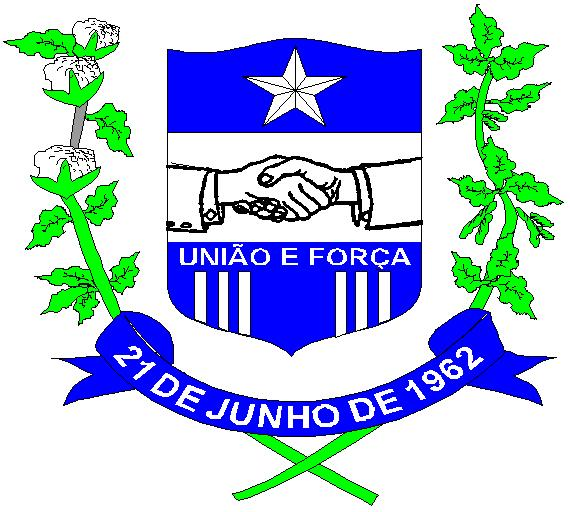
- Flag Coat of arms

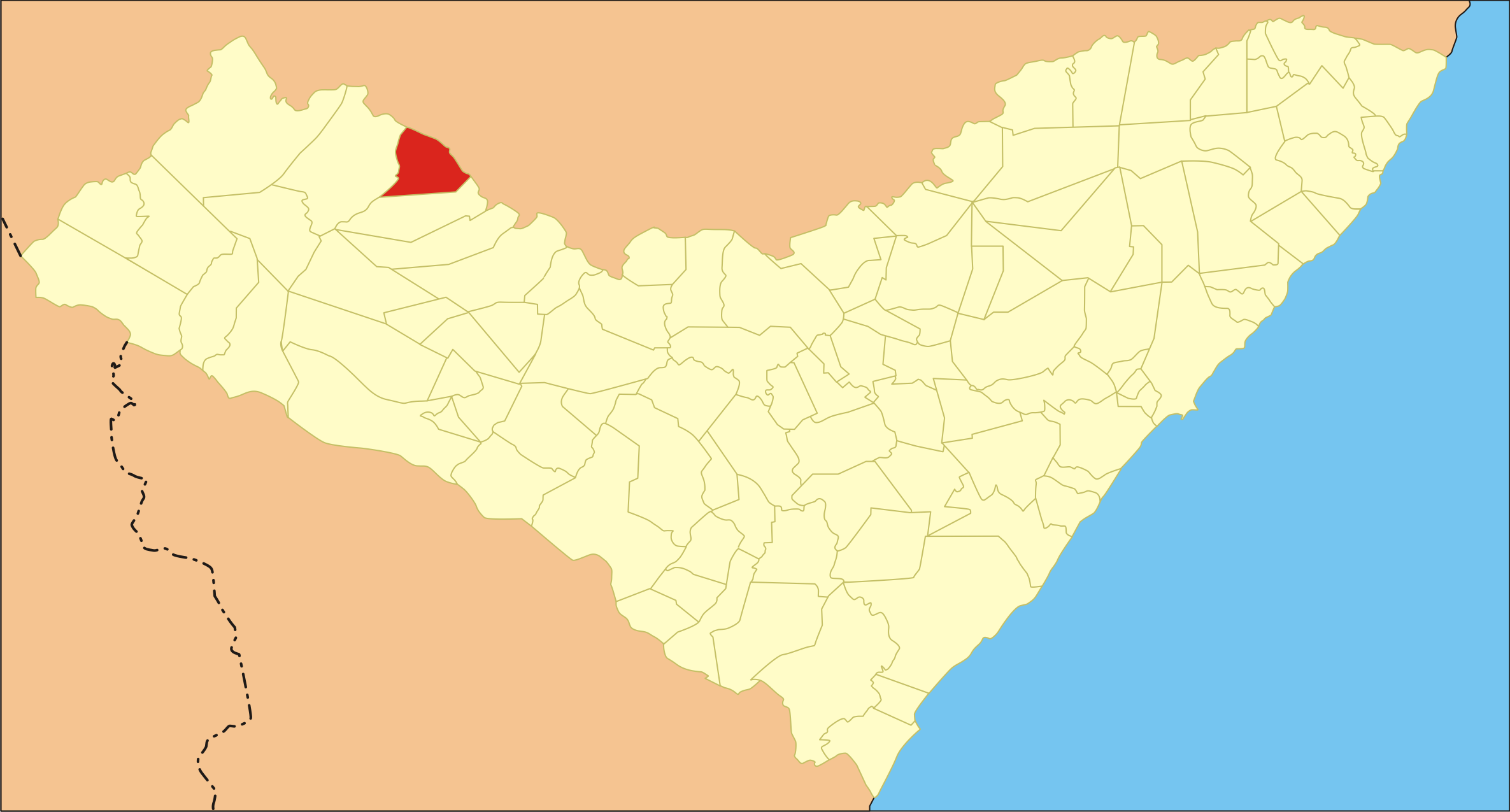

- Location in Brazil
- Coordinates: 9°10′00″S 37°21′24″W
- Country: Brazil
- Region: Northeast
- State: Alagoas
- Mesoregion: Sertão Alagoano

Population (2020)
  - Total: 11,535
- Time zone: UTC−3 (BRT)

Ouro Branco (Central northeastern portuguese pronunciation: [ˈoɾu ˈbɾɐ̃ku]) is a municipality in the state of Alagoas in the Northeast region of Brazil.

== See also ==
- List of municipalities in Alagoas
