= Jundiá =

Municipality in Alagoas, Brazil

- Municipality of Alagoas, Brazil
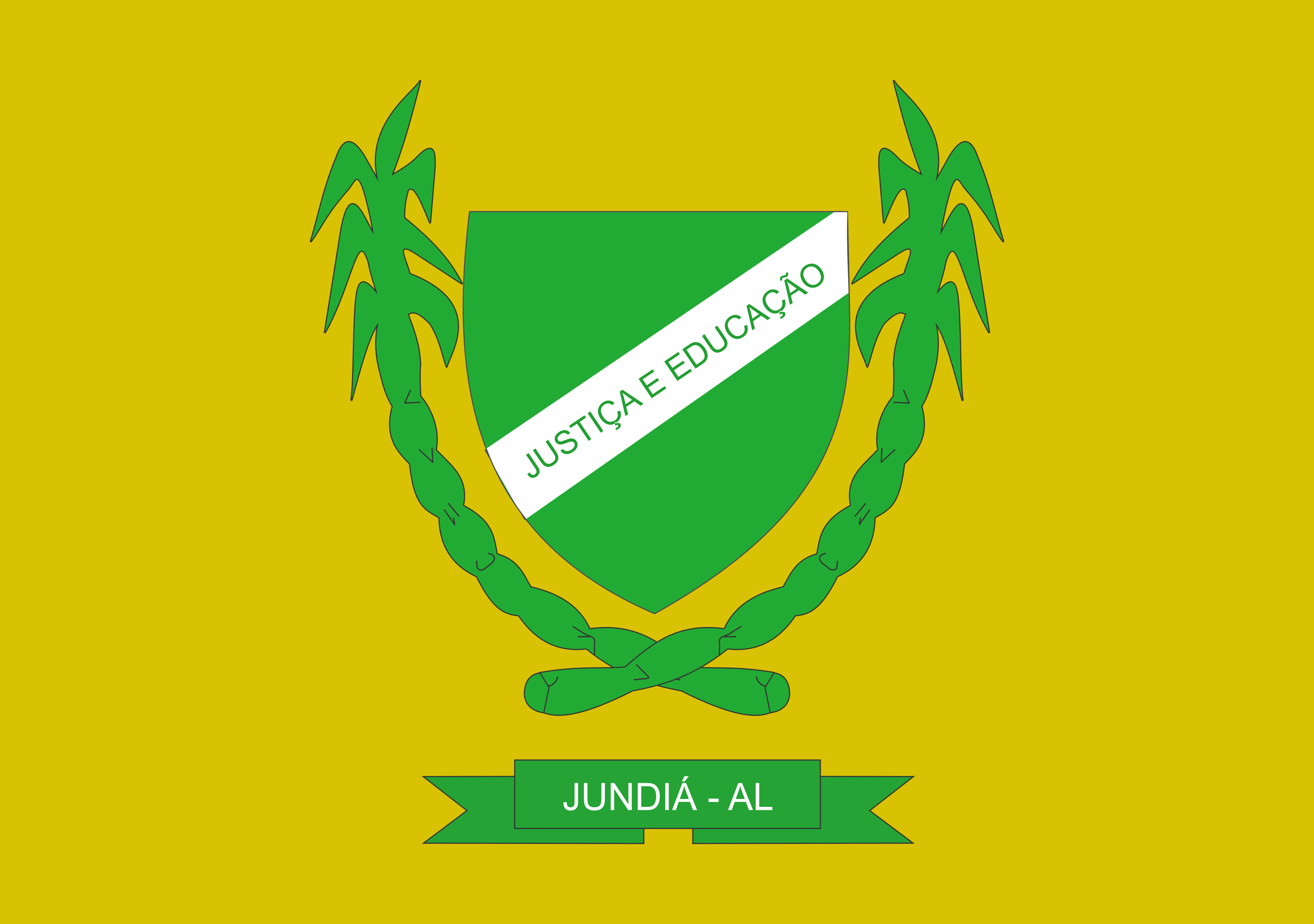
- Flag
- Etymology: Named after a type of fish abundant in the Manguaba River
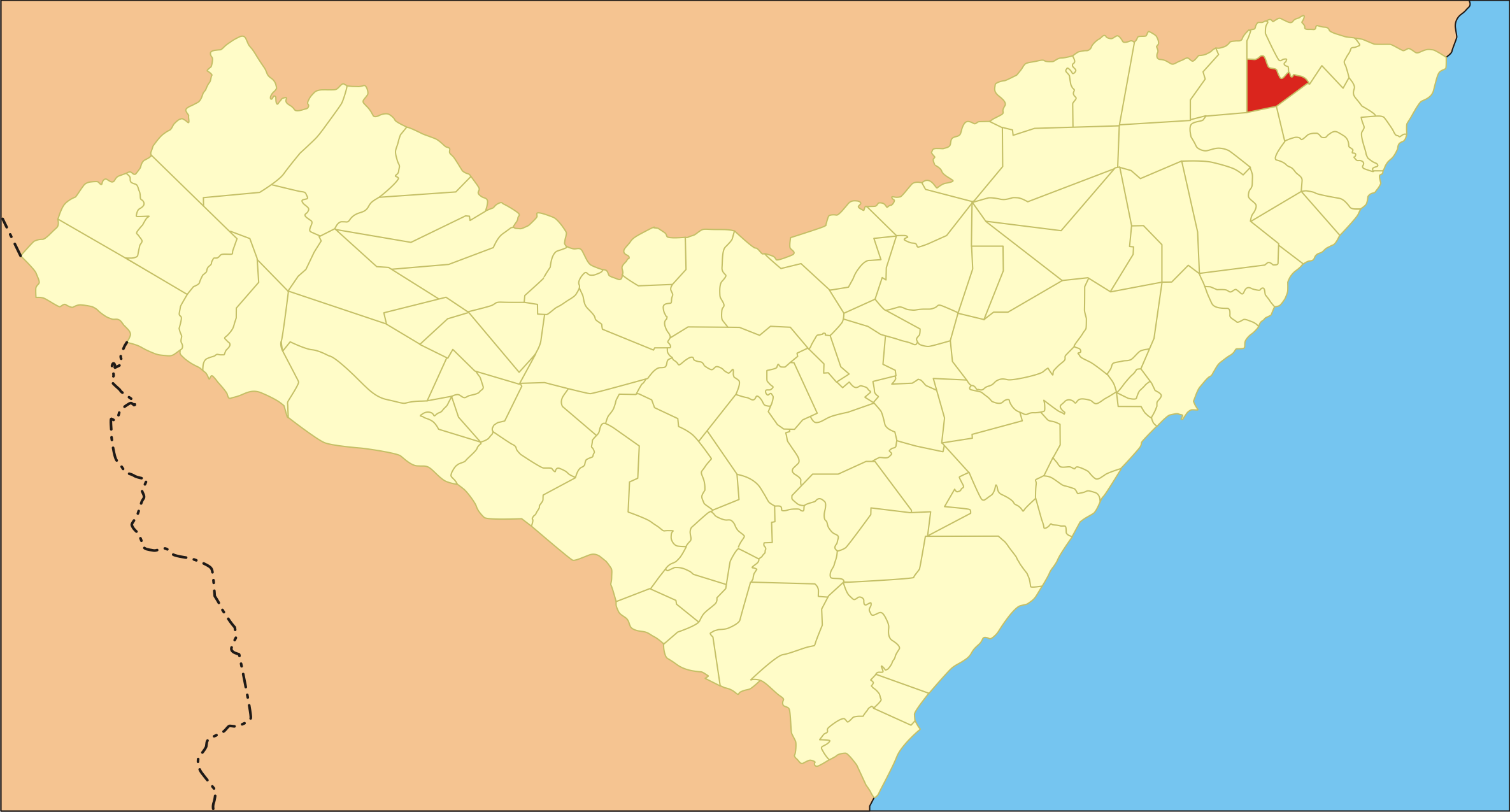
- Location of Jundiá in Alagoas

- Location within Brazil Location within South America
- Coordinates: 8°56′30″S 35°33′20″W
- Country: Brazil
- Region: Northeast
- State: Alagoas
- Founded: 26 August 1960

Government
  - Mayor: Jorge Silvio Luengo Galvão (MDB) (2025-2028)
  - Vice Mayor: Lielson Elias Bomfim (PSB) (2025-2028)

Area
  - Total: 88.793 km^{2} (34.283 sq mi)
- Elevation: 112 m (367 ft)

Population (2022)
  - Total: 4,092
  - Density: 46.08/km^{2} (119.3/sq mi)
- Demonym: Jundiaense (Brazilian Portuguese)
- Time zone: UTC-03:00 (Brasília Time)
- Postal code: 57965-000
- HDI (2010): 0.562 – medium
- Website: jundia.al.gov.br

Jundiá (Central northeastern portuguese pronunciation: [ʒũdiˈa]) is a municipality located in the Brazilian state of Alagoas. Its population is 4,137 (2020) and its area is 120 km^{2} (46 sq mi).

== See also ==
- List of municipalities in Alagoas
