= Paripueira =

Municipality in Alagoas, Brazil

- Municipality of Alagoas, Brazil
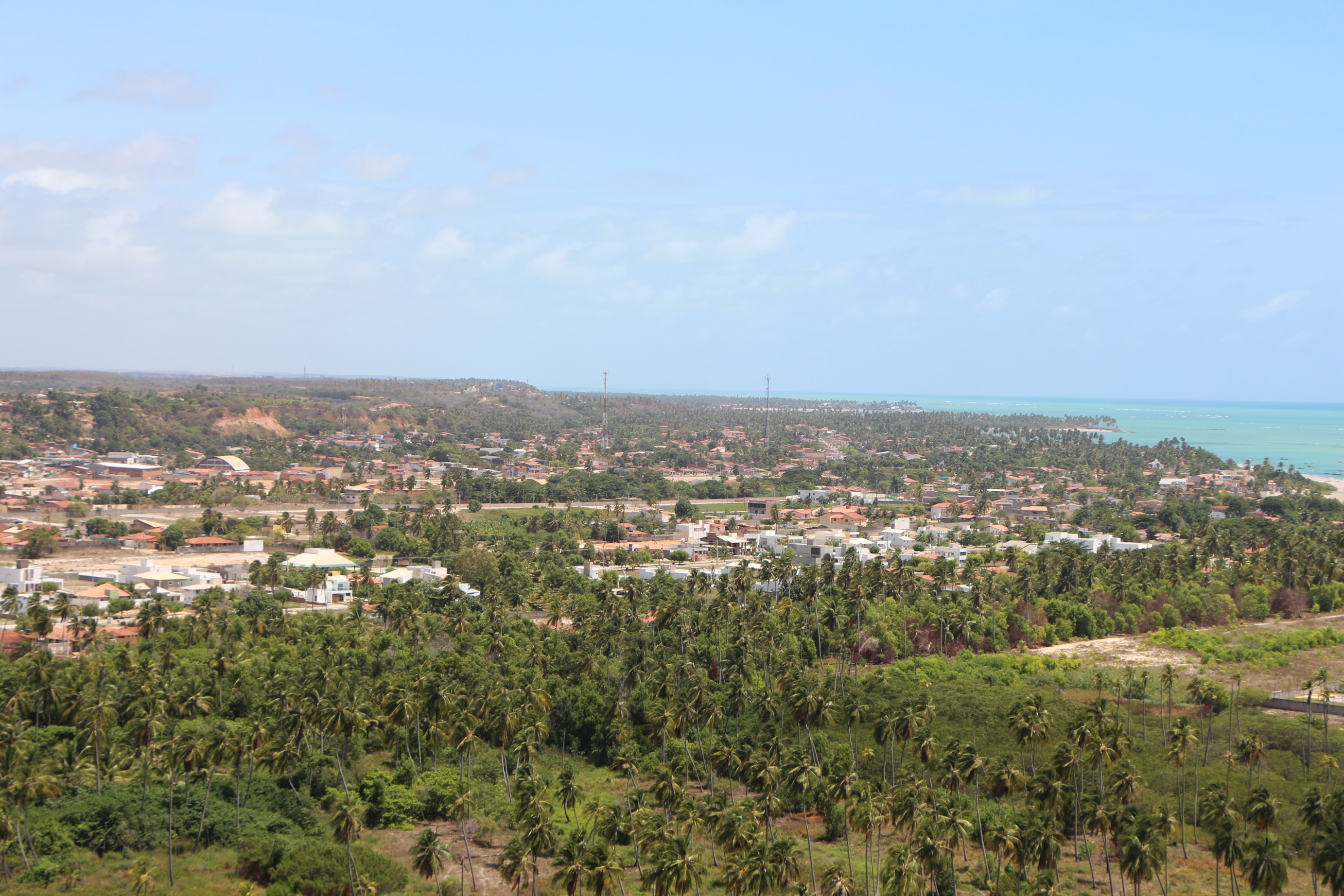
- Aerial view of Paripueira

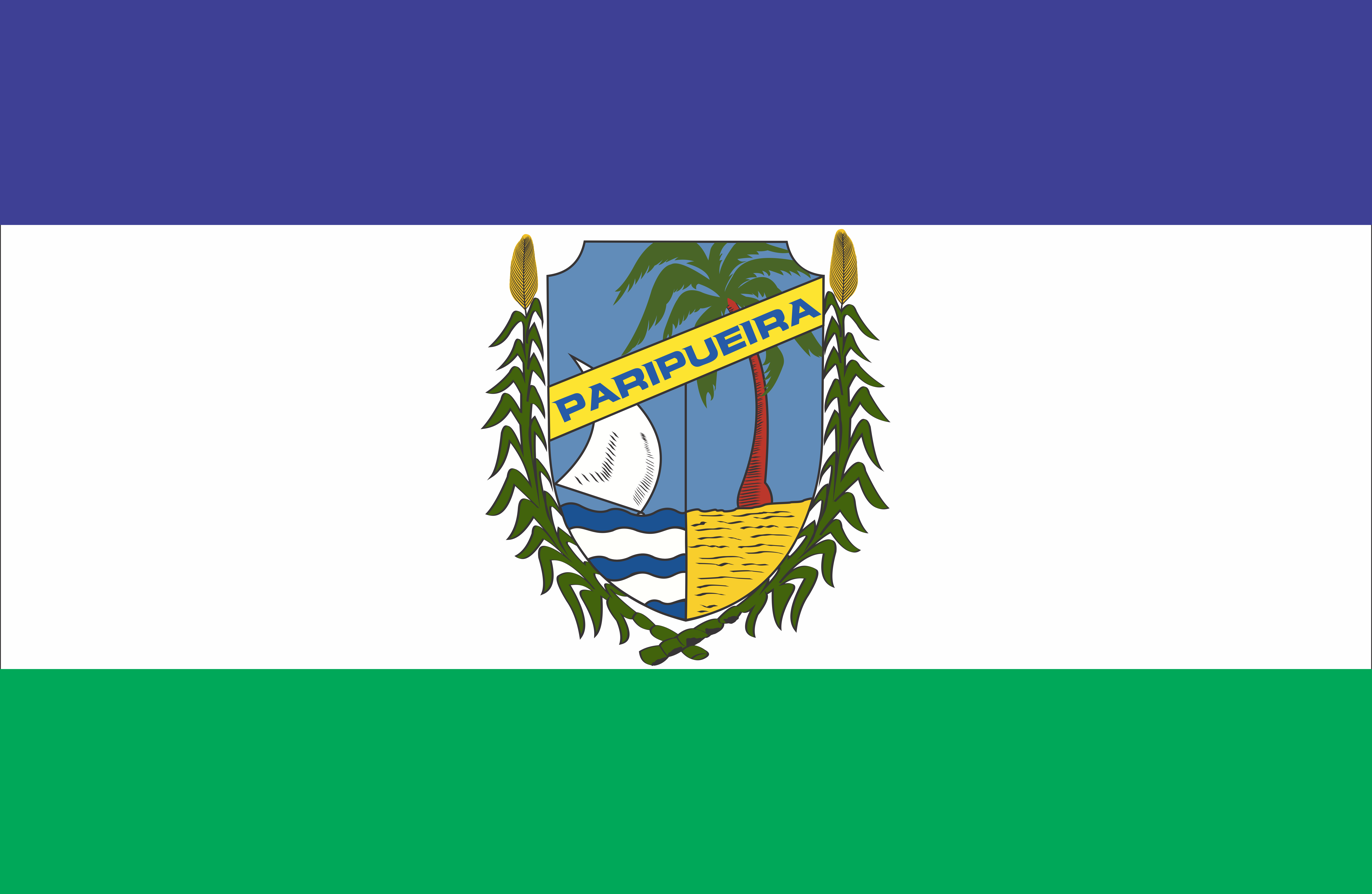
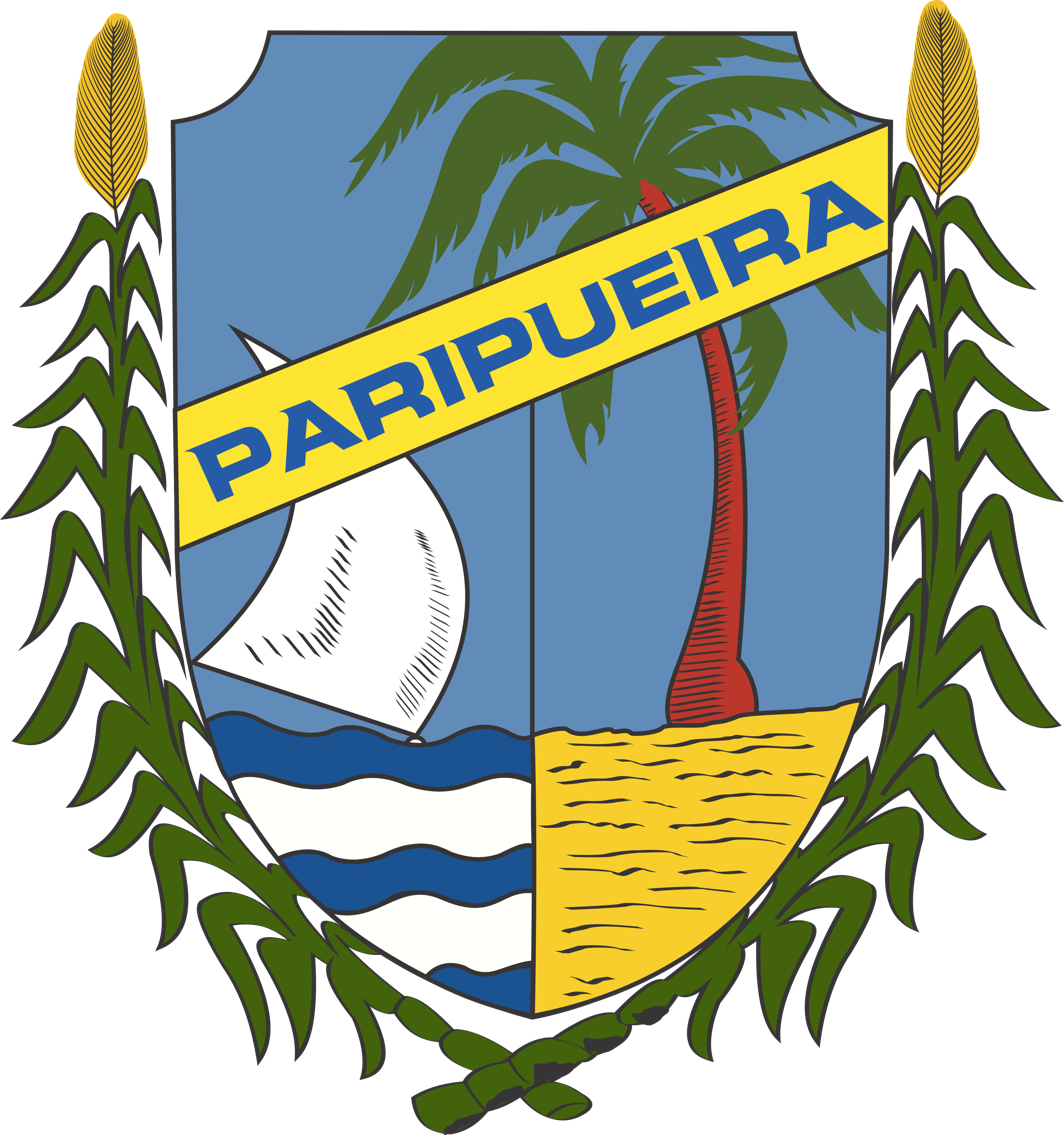
- Flag Coat of arms
- Etymology: Means "beach with calm waters" in the indigenous language
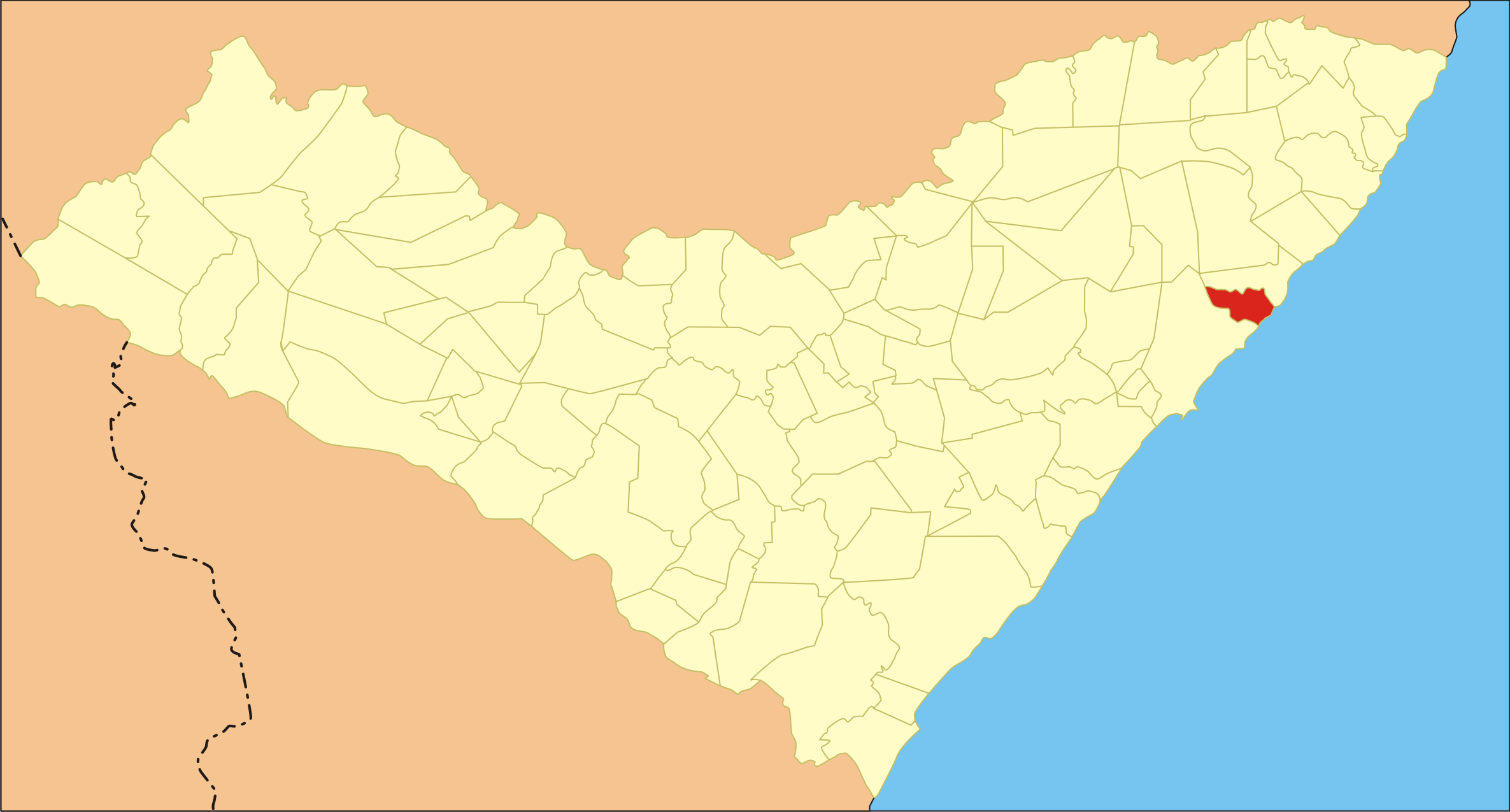
- Location of Paripueira in Alagoas

- Location within Brazil Location within South America
- Coordinates: 9°27′54″S 35°33′7″W
- Country: Brazil
- Region: Northeast
- State: Alagoas
- Founded: 5 October 1989

Government
  - Mayor: Carlos Abrahão Gomes de Moura (MDB) (2025-2028)
  - Vice Mayor: Carlos Augusto Sousa de Castro (MDB) (2025-2028)

Area
  - Total: 92.788 km^{2} (35.826 sq mi)
- Elevation: 0 m (0 ft)

Population (2022)
  - Total: 13,835
  - Density: 149.1/km^{2} (386/sq mi)
- Demonym: Paripueirense (Brazilian Portuguese)
- Time zone: UTC-03:00 (Brasília Time)
- Postal code: 57935-000
- HDI (2010): 0.605 – medium
- Website: paripueira.al.gov.br

Paripueira (Central northeastern portuguese pronunciation: [paˌɾipʊˈeɾɐ]) is a municipality located in the Brazilian state of Alagoas. Its population is 13,332 (2020) and its area is 93 km^{2}.

A tourist community, in the Tupi language “paripueira” means “calm waters”. The Praia de Sonho Verde (Green Dream Beach) is located here. The Amazonian manatee is protected here by the Municipal Marine Park for the Preservation of the Manatee.

== Geography ==
- Borders: Barra de Santo Antônio, Maceió, São Luiz do Quitunde and Atlantic Ocean. 5 meters above sea level.
- Area: 94.1 km^{2}
- Climate: Subtropical, hot and humid. High of 36°C (97°F) and low of 23°C (73°F).
- Population: 13,332 inhabitants.
- Electorate: 7,309 voters.
- Economy: Fishing, tourism, sugar cane.
- Education: 2,030 seats (state and municipal systems).
- Health: 2 clinics.
- Access: AL-101 North.

== Tourism ==
Paripueira is one of the longest beaches in Alagoas. At low tide it is possible to walk miles offshore in knee-deep water. The beach has summer homes, fishermen and 25 tide pools, the largest concentration of tide pools in the world. The coral formations in the region are considered the second largest barrier reef in the world.

== Gallery ==
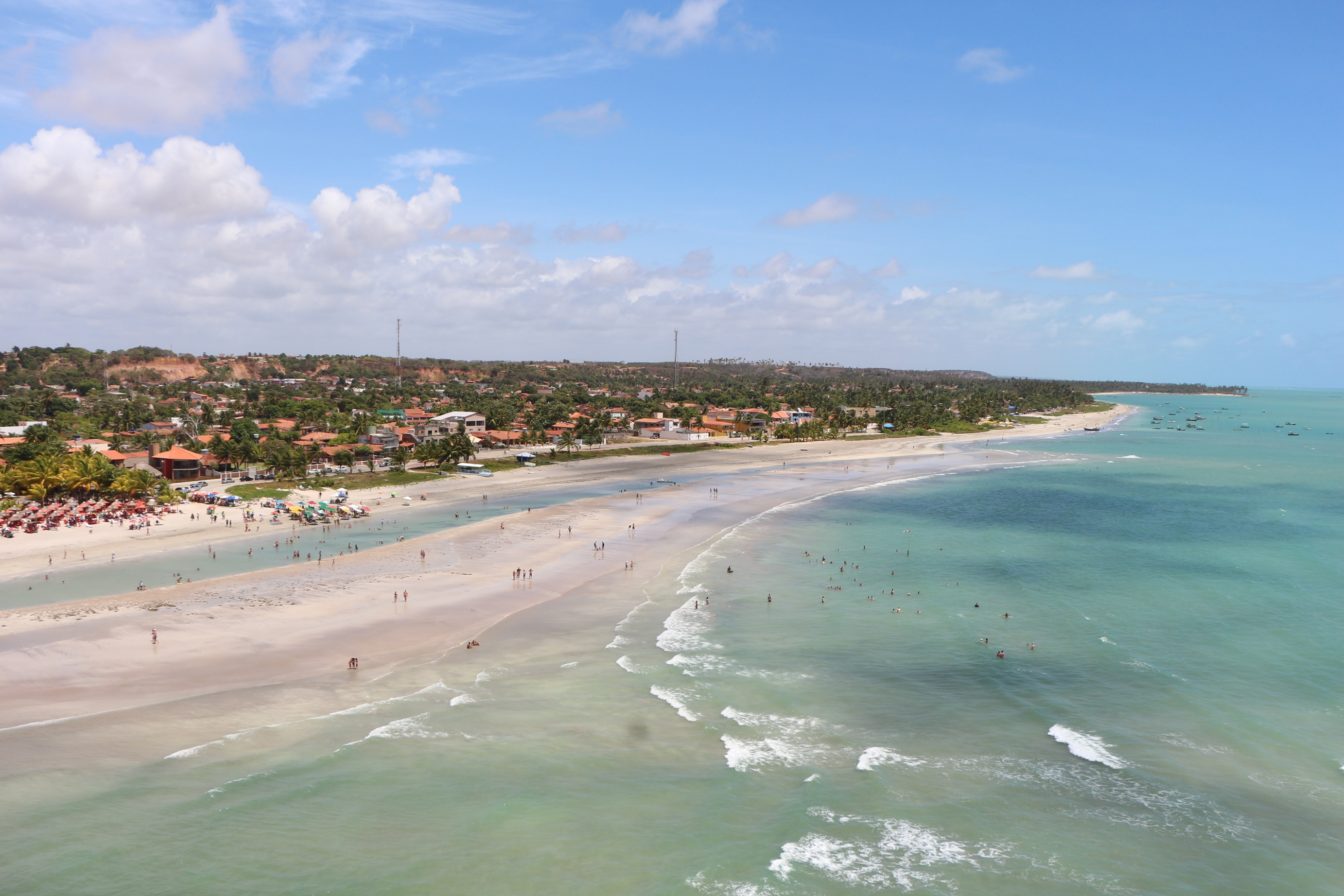
Aerial view of Paripueira

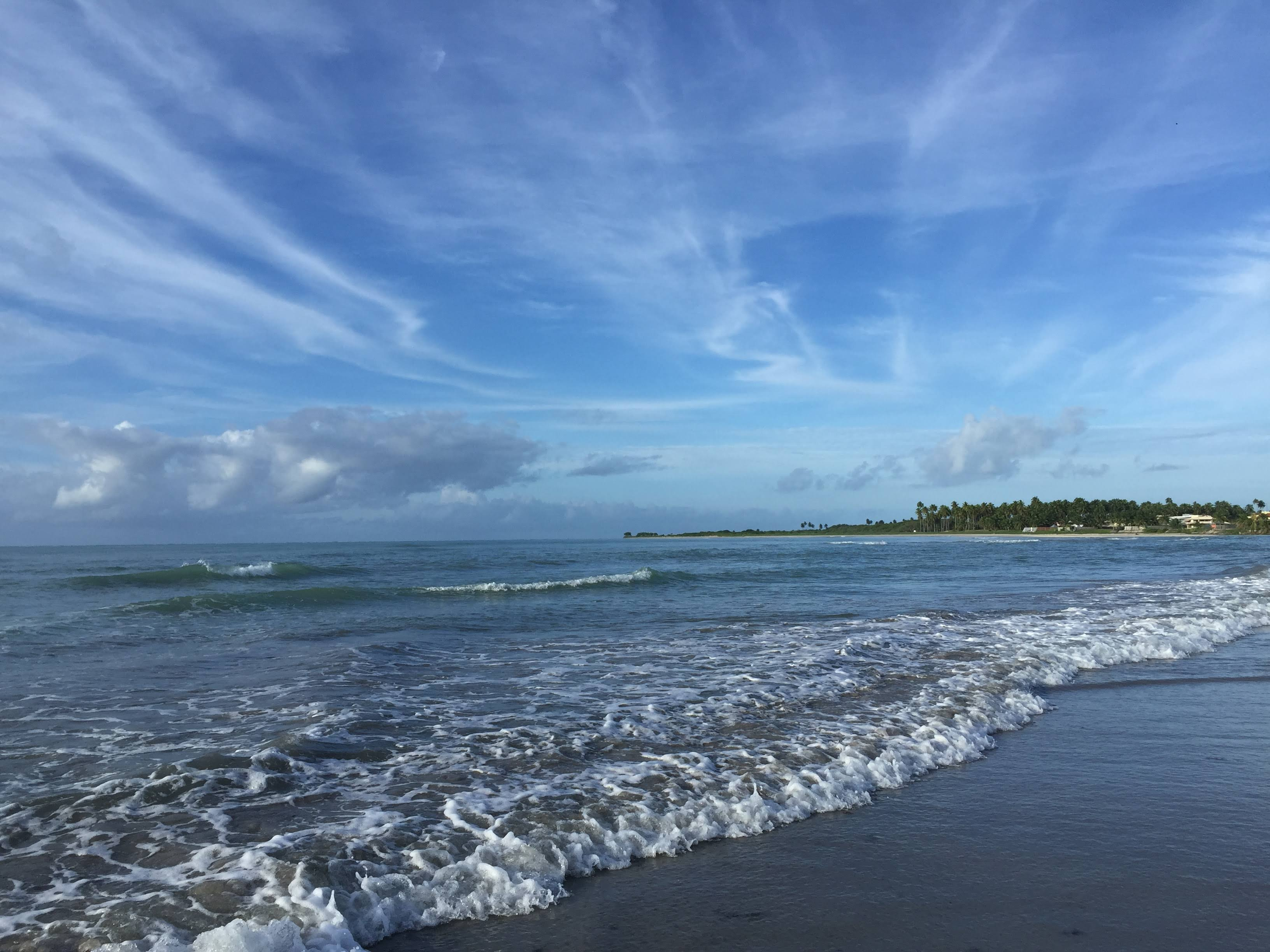
Beach in Paripueira

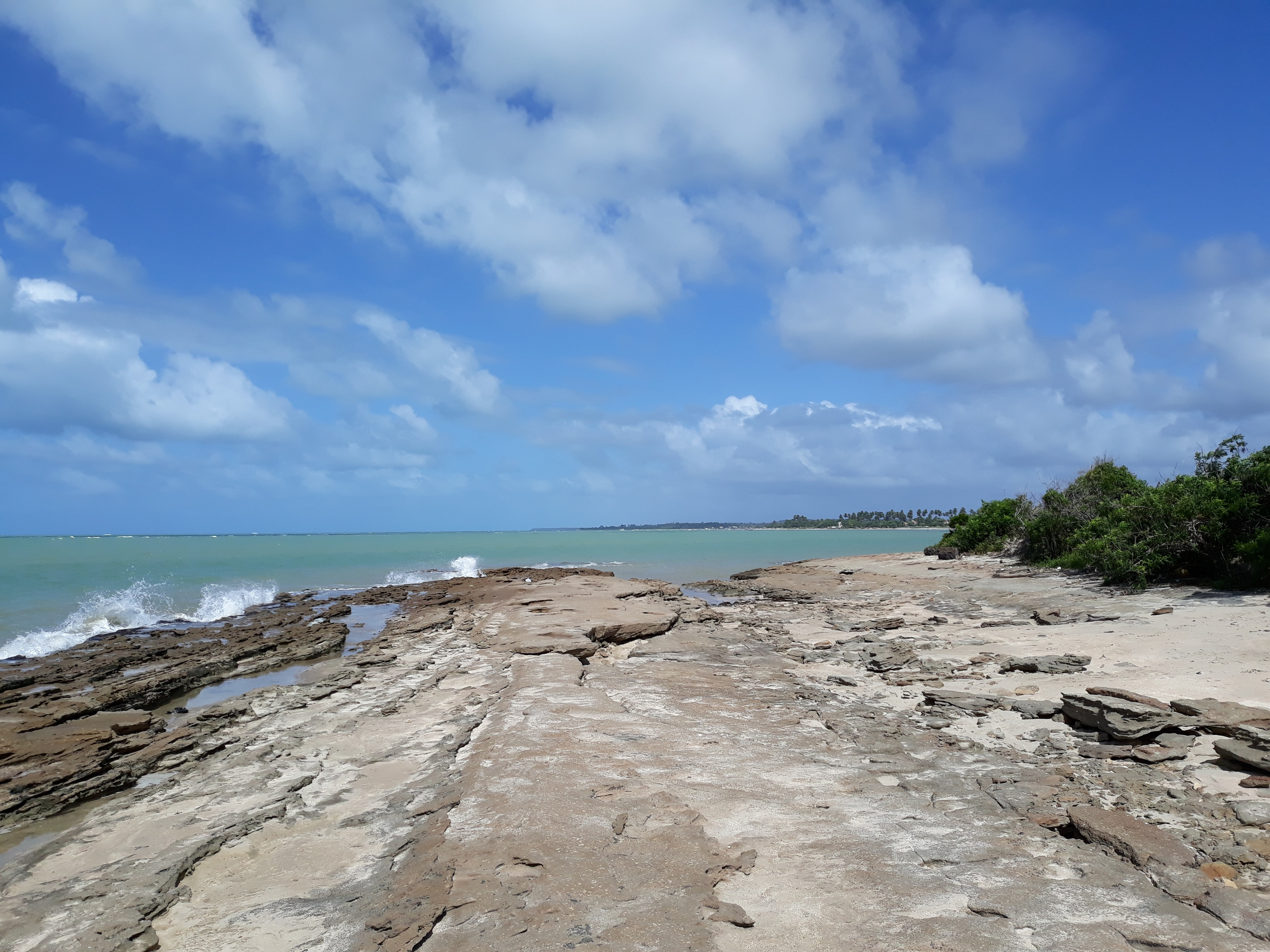
Beach in Paripueira

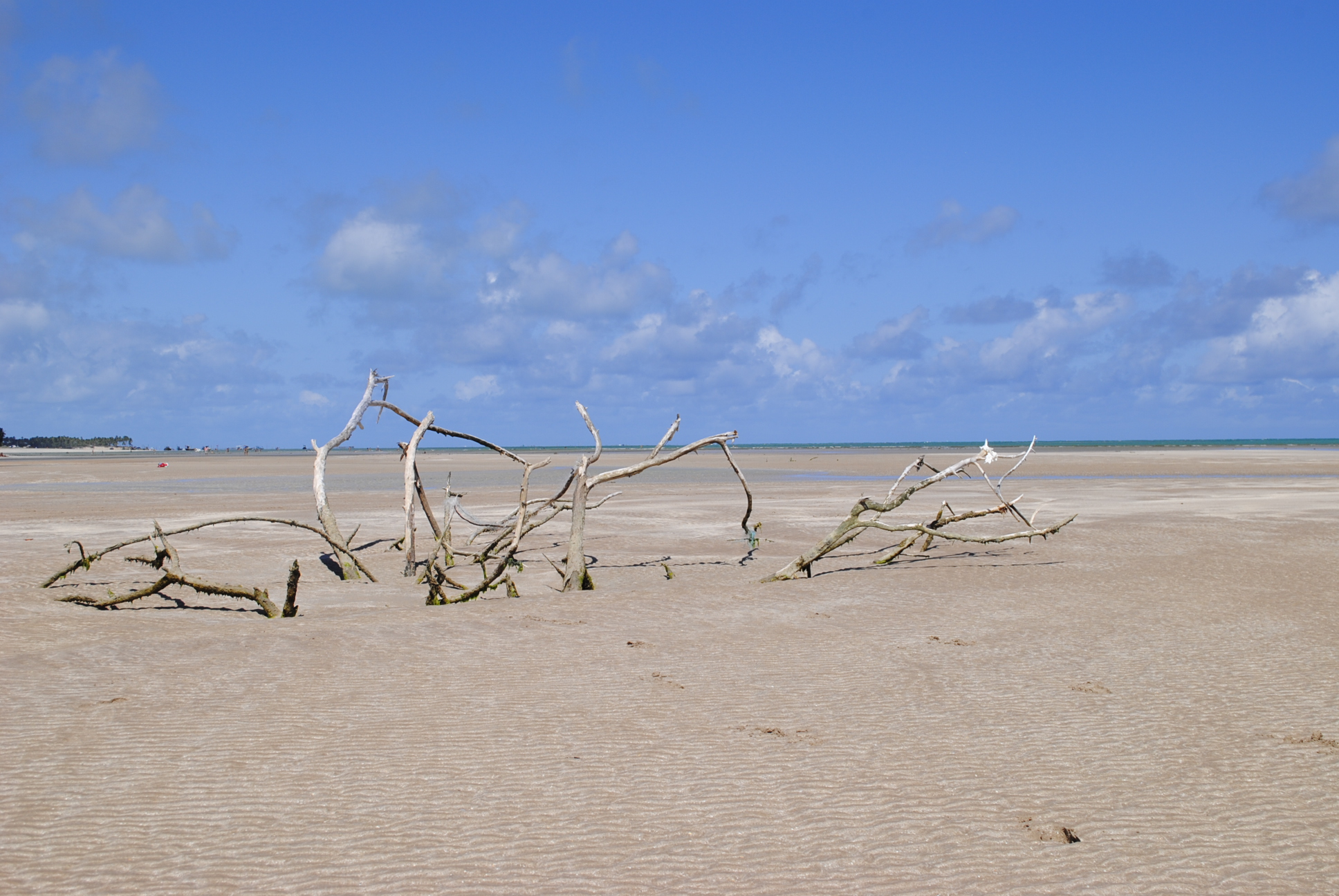
Paripueira Beach

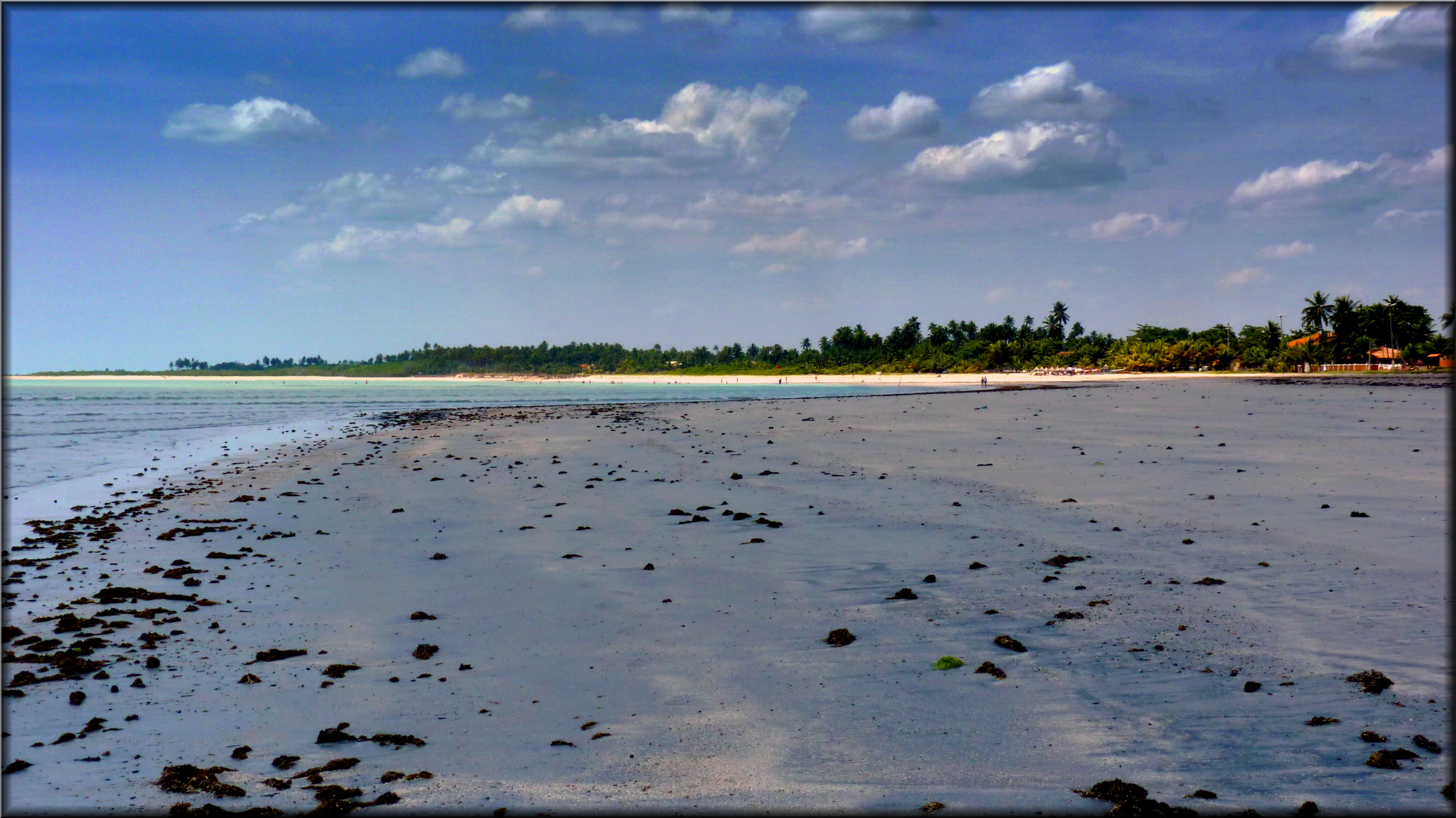
Paripueira Beach

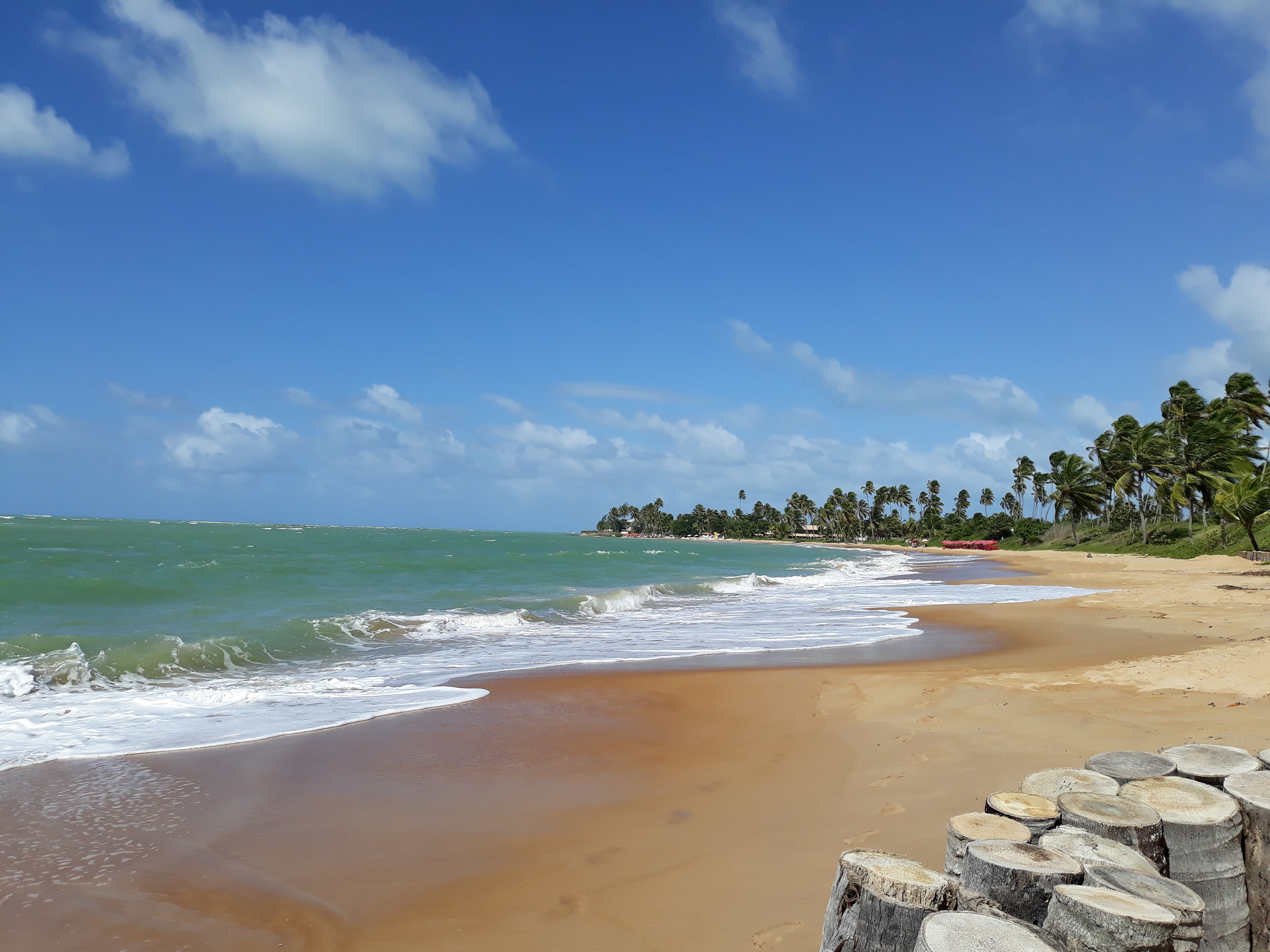
Sonho Verde Beach

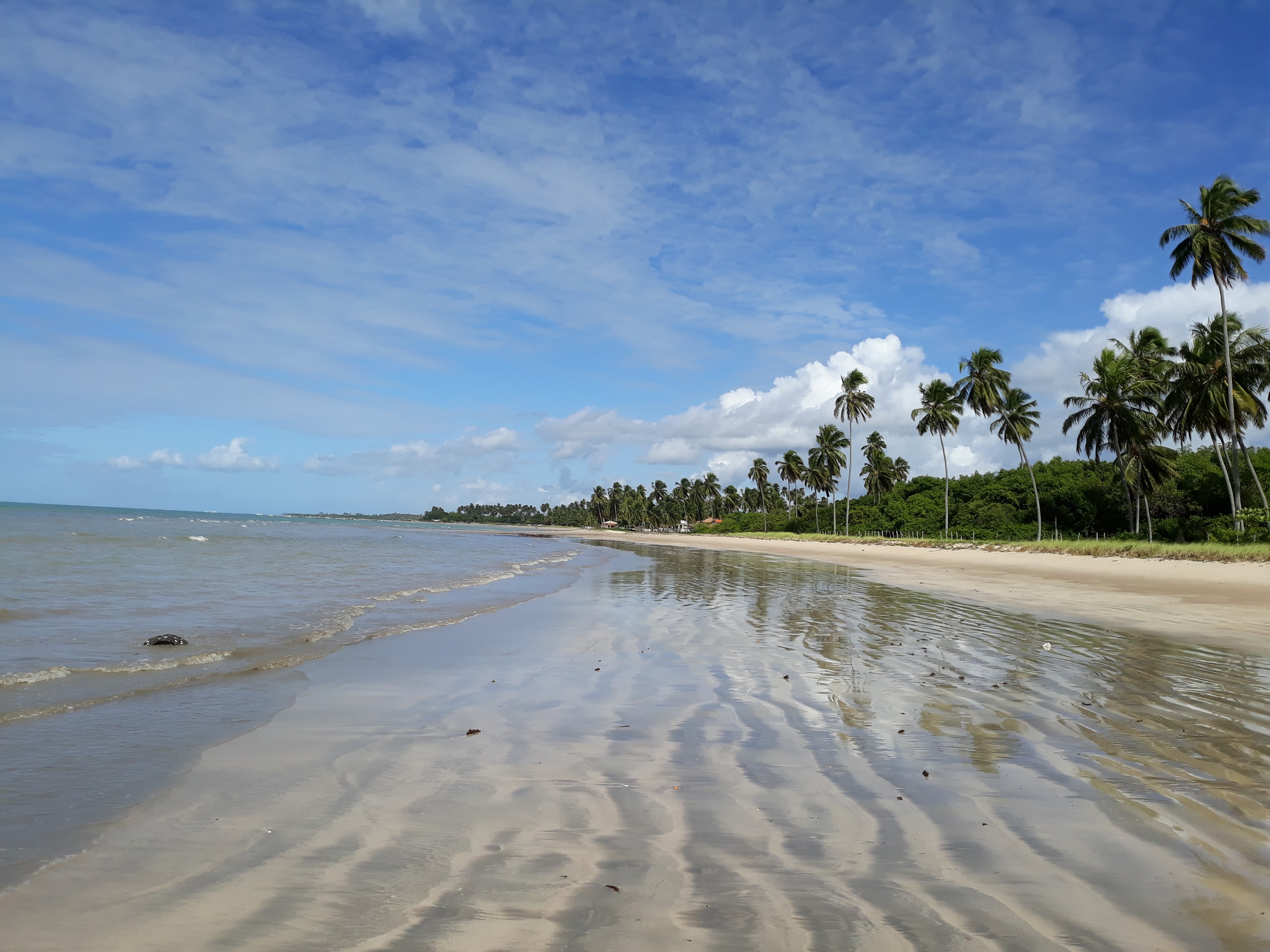
Beach in Paripueira

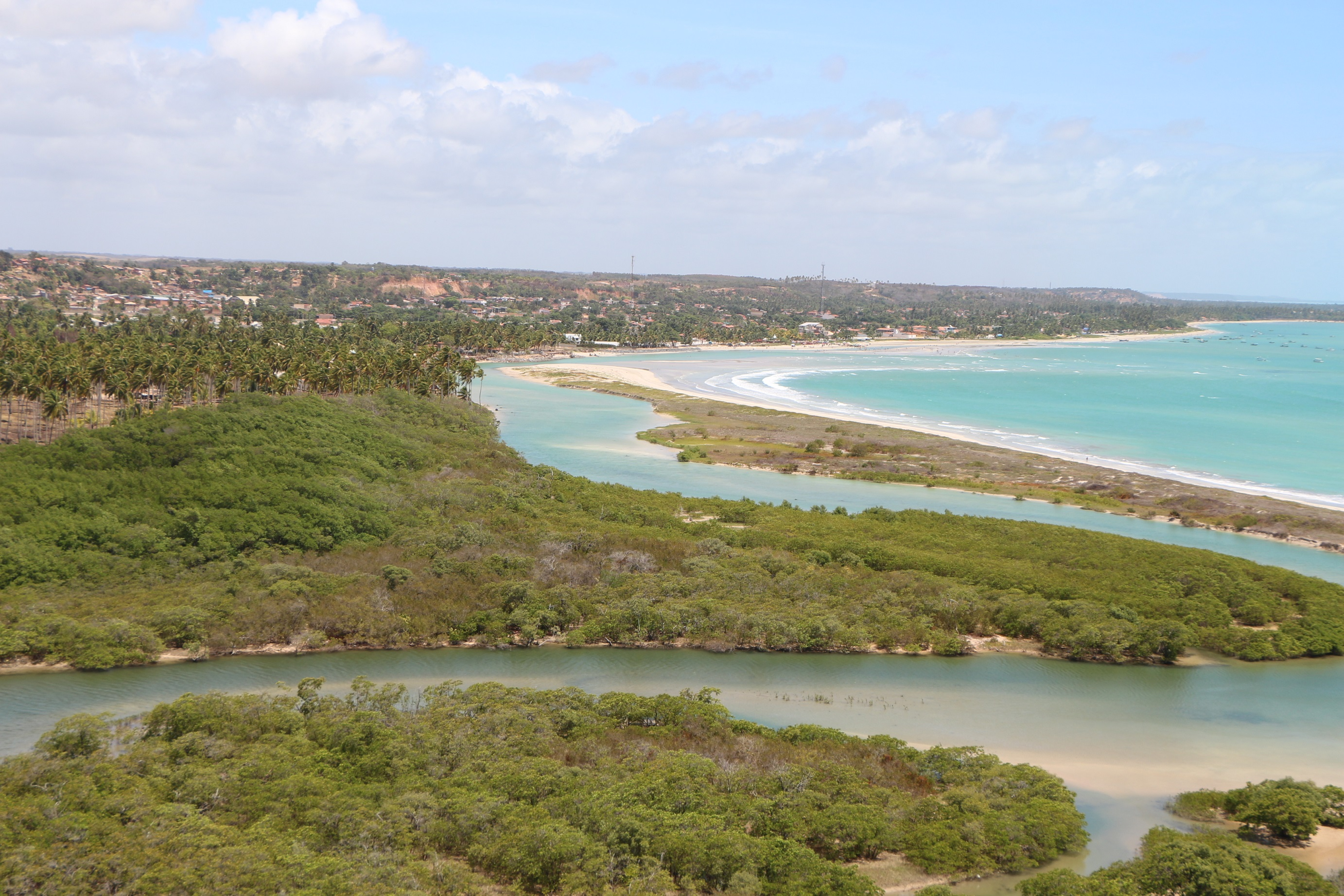
Sauaçuhy River

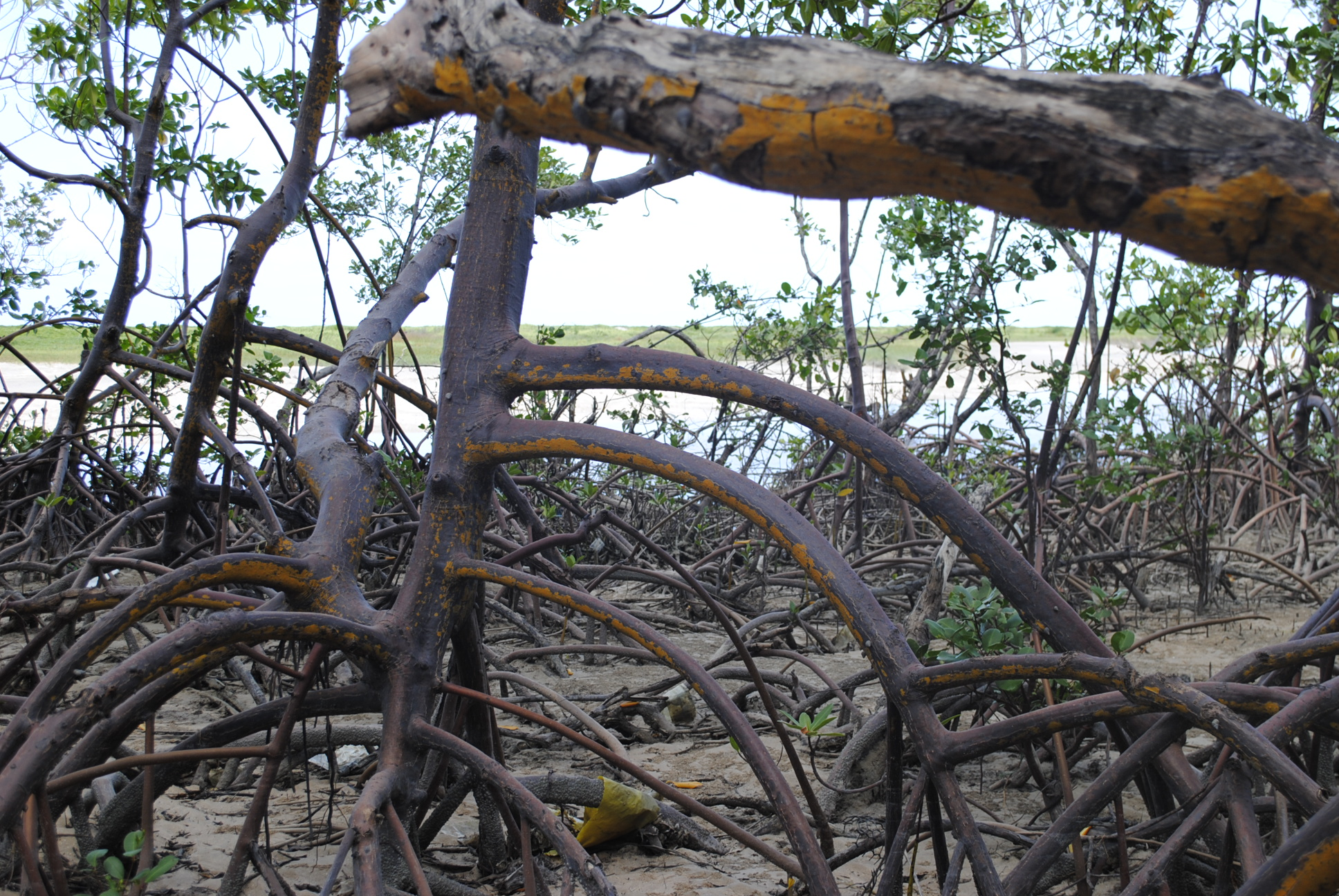
Mangroves in Paripueira

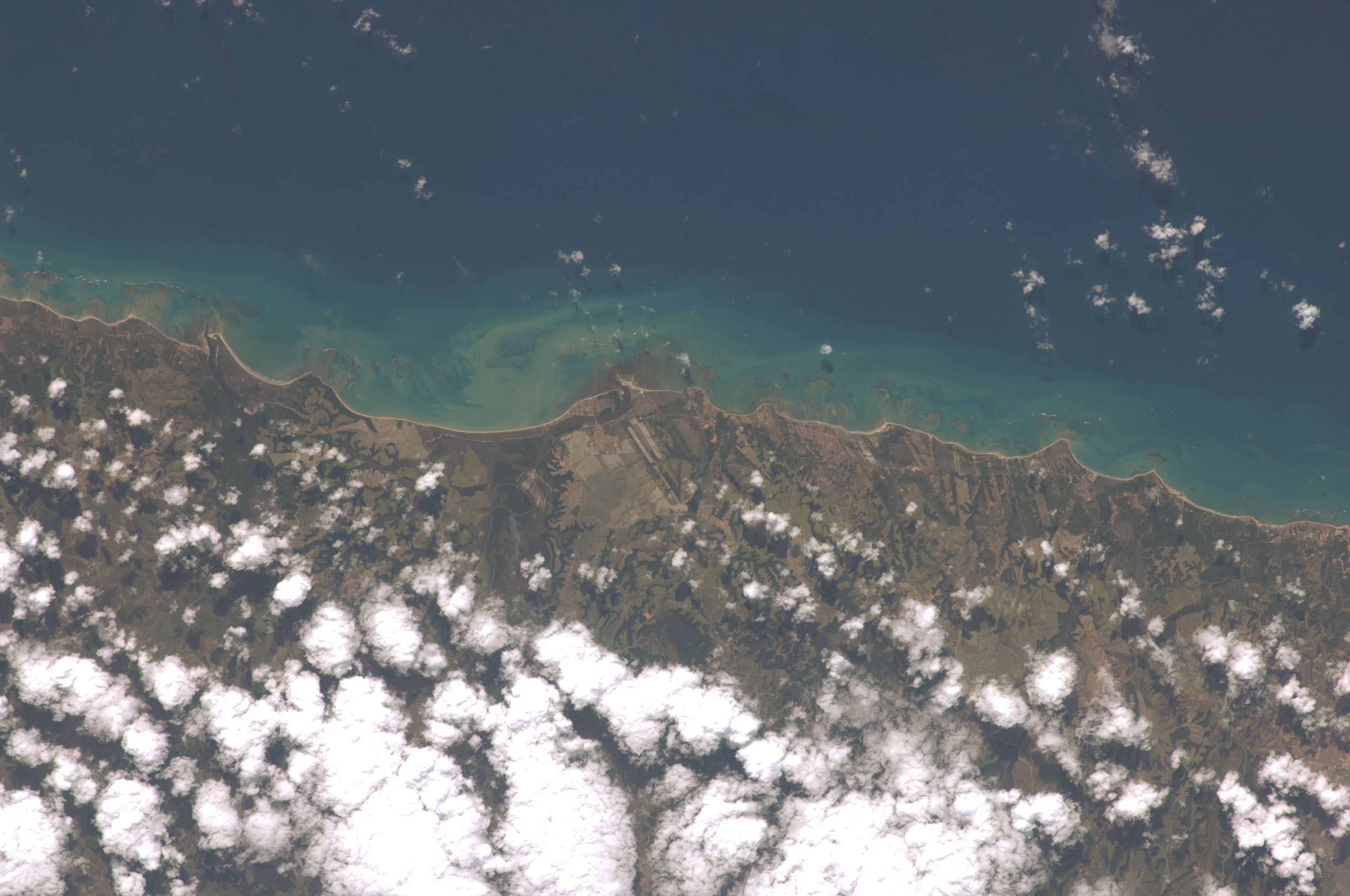
View of Paripueira from the International Space Station

== See also ==
- List of municipalities in Alagoas
