= Mar Vermelho, Alagoas =

Municipality of Alagoas, Brazil

Mar Vermelho
- Municipality of Alagoas, Brazil
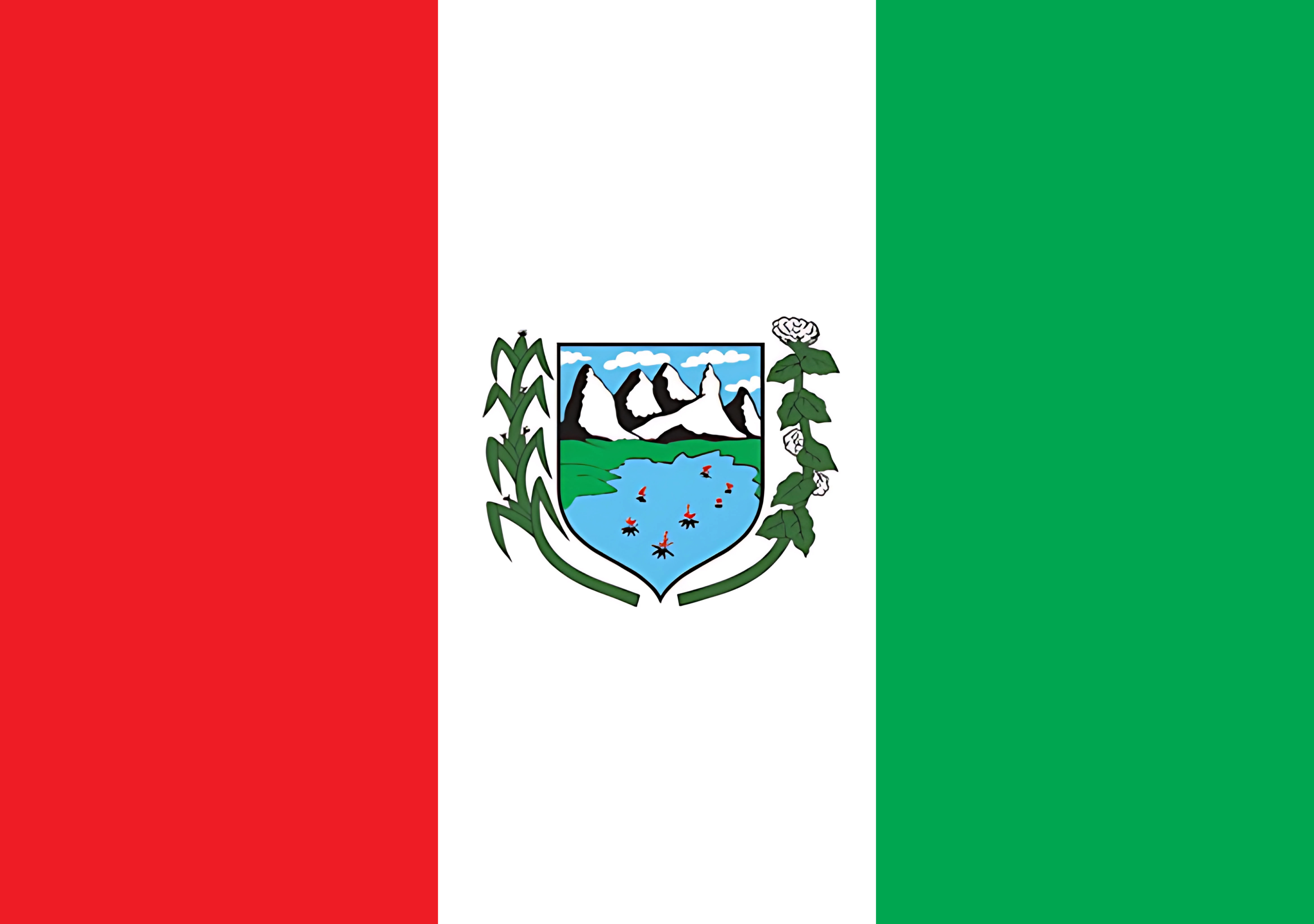
- Flag
- Etymology: Means in Brazilian Portuguese "Red sea", due to the existence of a lake in the area which had trees on its banks, with the red leaves of the trees falling onto the lake, the lake turned red, resembling a red sea
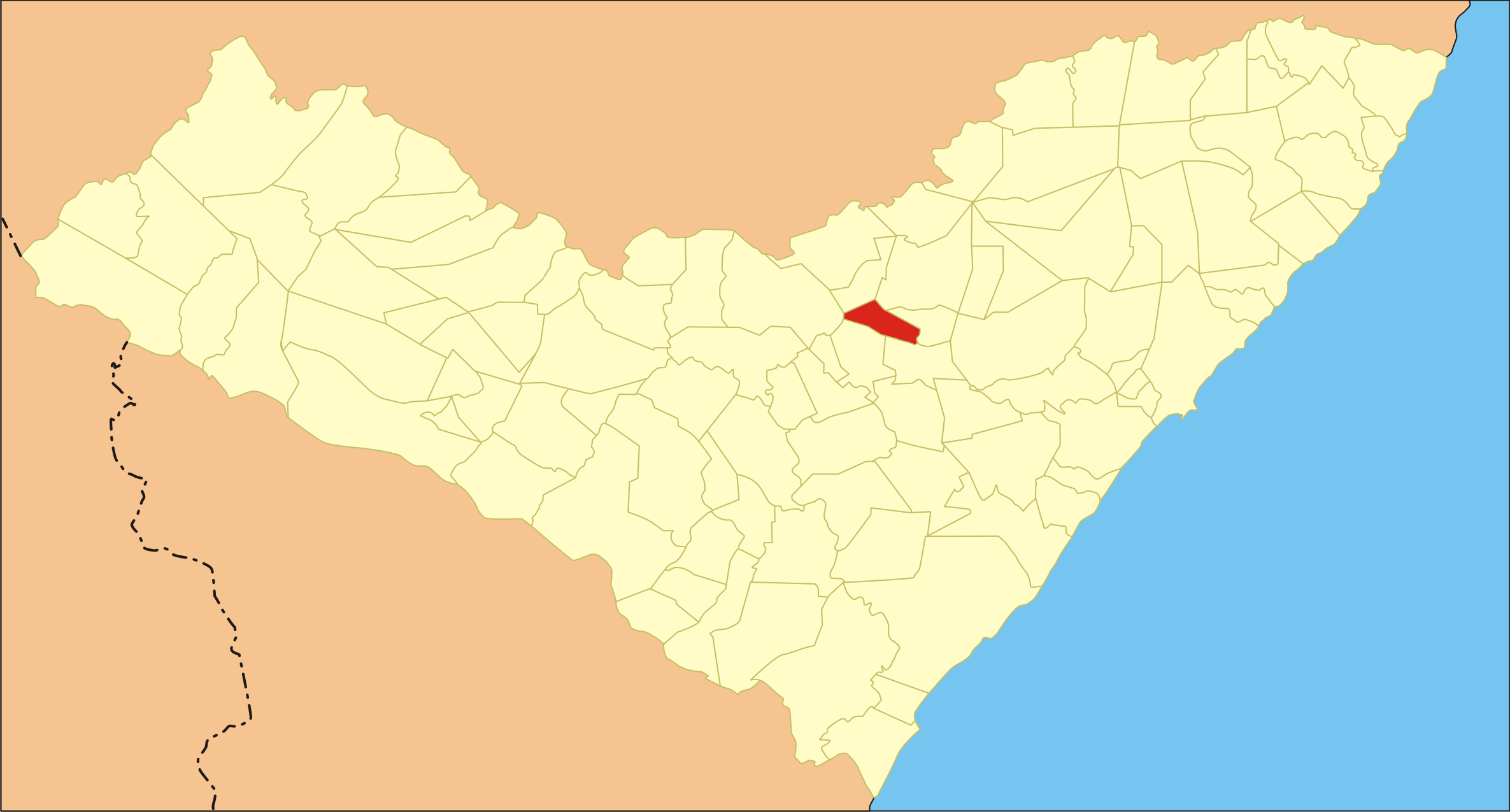
- Location of Mar Vermelho in Alagoas

- Location within Brazil Location within South America
- Coordinates: 9°26′52″S 36°23′16″W
- Country: Brazil
- Region: Northeast
- State: Alagoas
- Founded: 25 March 1962

Government
  - Mayor: André Brandão de Almeida (MDB) (2025-2028)
  - Vice Mayor: Hermann Elson de Almeida Filho (MDB) (2025-2028)

Area
  - Total: 91.741 km^{2} (35.421 sq mi)
- Elevation: 732 m (2,402 ft)

Population (2022)
  - Total: 3,155
  - Density: 34.39/km^{2} (89.1/sq mi)
- Demonym: Mar-vermelhense (Brazilian Portuguese)
- Time zone: UTC-03:00 (Brasília Time)
- Postal code: 57730-000
- HDI (2010): 0.577 – medium
- Website: marvermelho.al.gov.br

Mar Vermelho (Central northeastern portuguese pronunciation: [ˈma veɦˈmejʊ]) is a municipality located in the Brazilian state of Alagoas. Its population is 3,494 (2020) and its area is 91,741 km^{2}.

== See also ==
- List of municipalities in Alagoas
