= Campestre, Alagoas =

Municipality of Alagoas, Brazil

Campestre
- Municipality
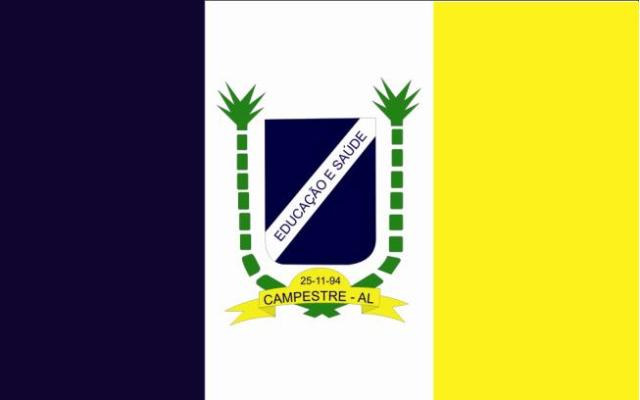
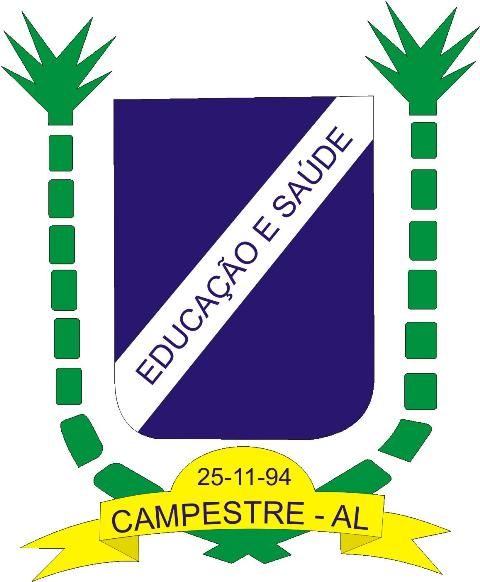
- Flag Coat of arms

- Location in Brazil
- Coordinates: 8°50′45″S 35°34′4″W
- Country: Brazil
- Region: Northeast
- State: Alagoas
- Mesoregion: Leste Alagoano

Population (2020 est)
  - Total: 6,954
- Time zone: UTC−3 (BRT)

Campestre (Central northeastern portuguese pronunciation: [kɐ̃ˈpɛʃtɾi]) is a municipality in the state of Alagoas in the Northeast region of Brazil.

== See also ==
- List of municipalities in Alagoas
