= Maravilha, Alagoas =

Municipality in Alagoas, Brazil

Maravilha
- Municipality of Alagoas, Brazil
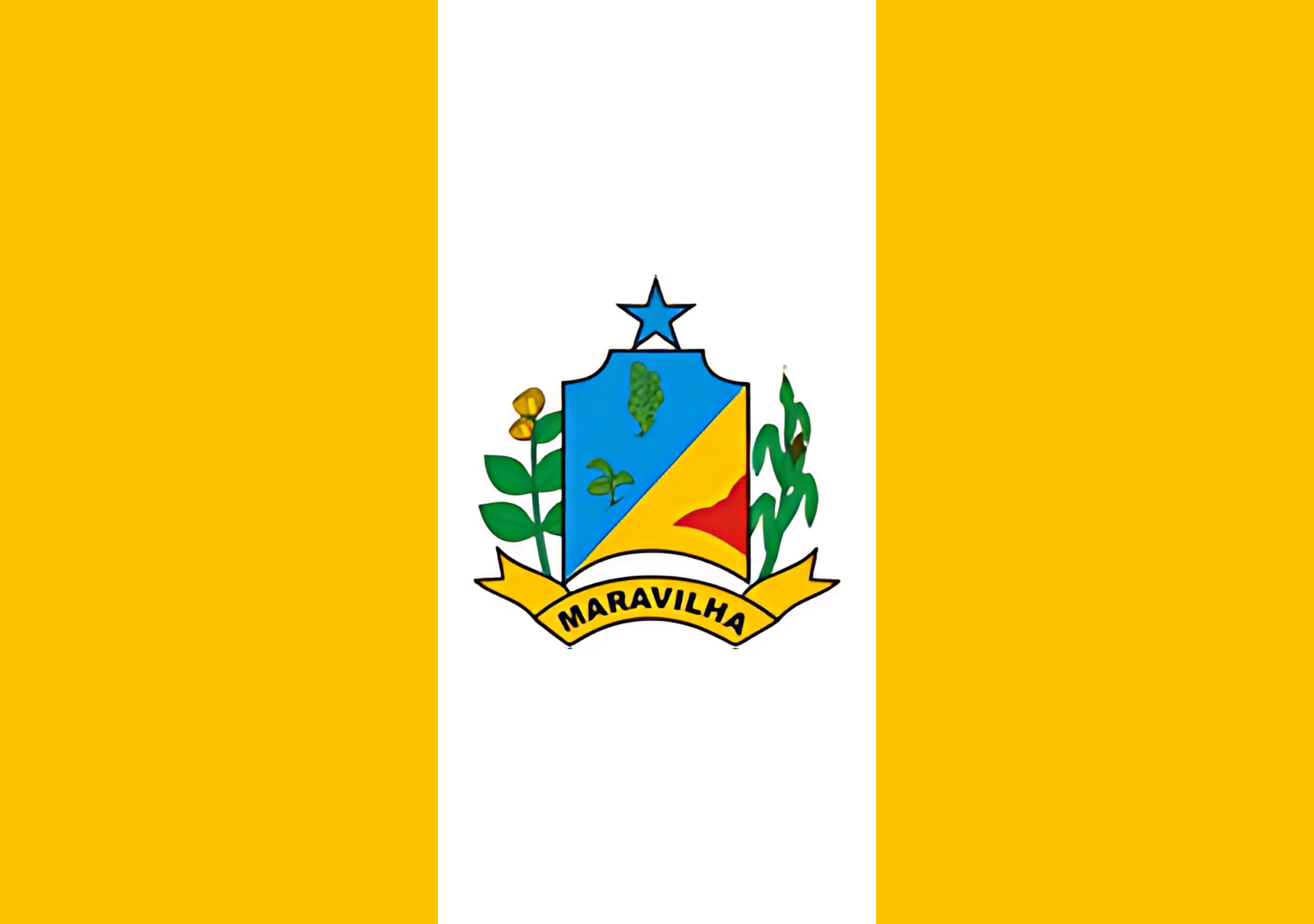
- Flag
- Etymology: Means in Brazilian Portuguese "Wonder", after a priest said the place will still be a wonder after a graveyard for the victims of a cholera epidemic was established in the area
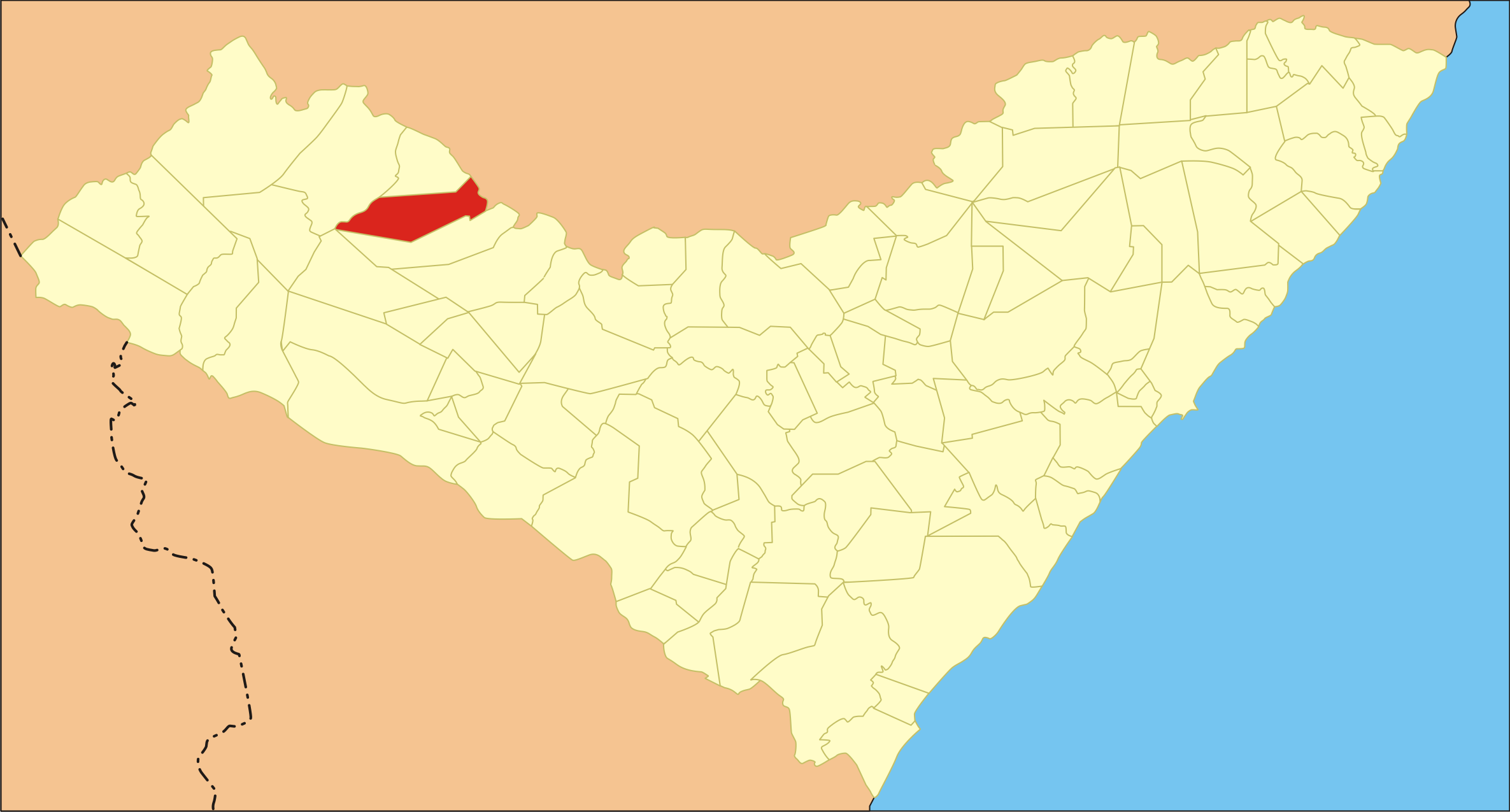
- Location of Maravilha in Alagoas

- Location within Brazil Location within South America
- Coordinates: 9°14′9″S 37°21′0″W
- Country: Brazil
- Region: Northeast
- State: Alagoas
- Founded: 2 January 1959

Government
  - Mayor: Antônio Jorge Rodrigues (Republicanos) (2025-2028)
  - Vice Mayor: Carlos Luiz Martins Marques (Republicanos) (2025-2028)

Area
  - Total: 332.370 km^{2} (128.329 sq mi)
- Elevation: 378 m (1,240 ft)

Population (2022)
  - Total: 9,534
  - Density: 28.68/km^{2} (74.3/sq mi)
- Demonym: Maravilhense (Brazilian Portuguese)
- Time zone: UTC-03:00 (Brasília Time)
- Postal code: 57520-000
- HDI (2010): 0.569 – medium
- Website: maravilha.al.gov.br

Maravilha (Central northeastern portuguese pronunciation: [mɐɾɐˈviɐ]) is a municipality located in the western of the Brazilian state of Alagoas. Its population is 9,004 (2020) and its area is 279 km^{2}.

== See also ==
- List of municipalities in Alagoas
