= Traipu =

Municipality of Alagoas, Brazil

- Municipality
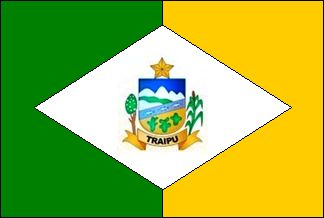
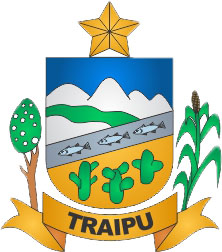
- Flag Coat of arms

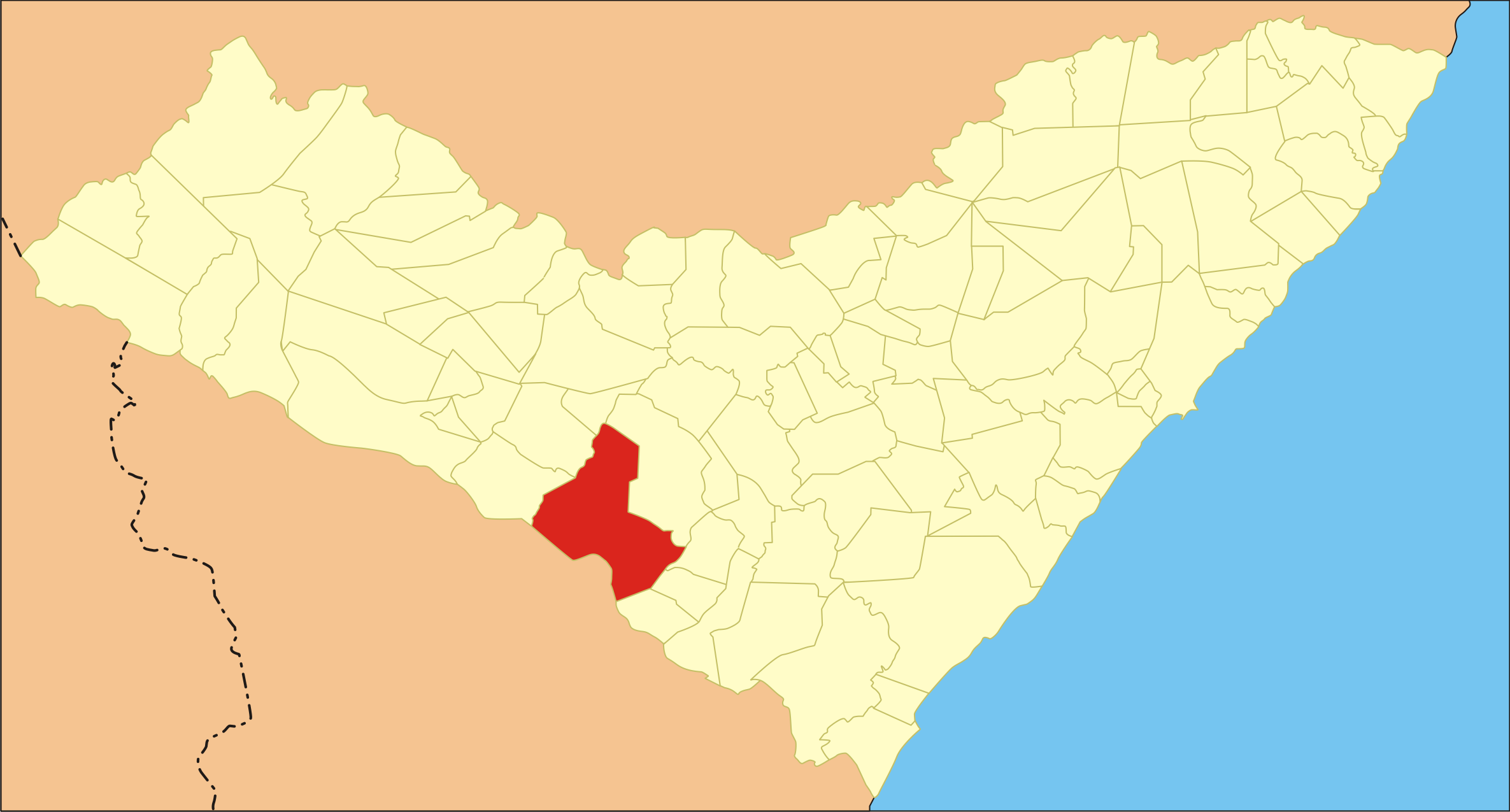
- Location of Traipu in the State of Alagoas

- Location in Brazil
- Coordinates: 09°58′15″S 37°00′10″W
- Country: Brazil

Population (2020 est)
  - Total: 27,826
- Time zone: UTC−3 (BRT)
- Website: Official website (no response at 2012-11-25)

Traipu (Central northeastern portuguese pronunciation: [tɾɐjˈpu]) is a municipality located in the Brazilian state of Alagoas. Its population was 27,826 (2020) and its area is 698 km^{2} (269 sq mi).
