= Chã Preta =

Municipality in Alagoas, Brazil

- Municipality of Alagoas, Brazil
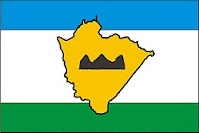
- Flag Coat of arms

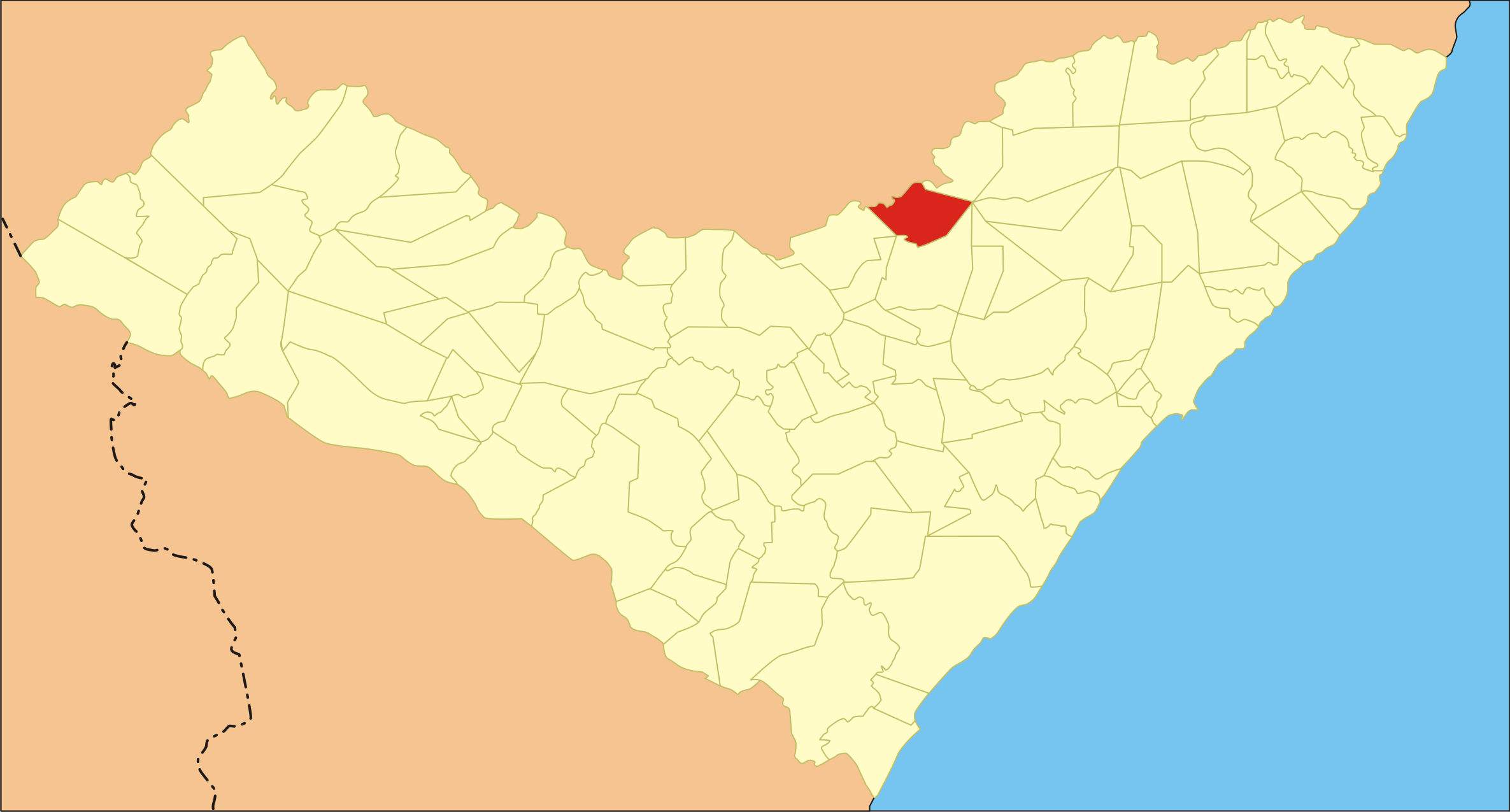
- Location of Chã Preta in Alagoas

- Location within Brazil Location within South America
- Coordinates: 9°15′18″S 36°17′45″W
- Country: Brazil
- Region: Northeast
- State: Alagoas
- Founded: 3 November 1962

Government
  - Mayor: Mauricio de Vasconcelos Holanda (MDB) (2025-2028)
  - Vice Mayor: Victor Salvio Canuto Teixeira (MDB) (2025-2028)

Area
  - Total: 157.831 km^{2} (60.939 sq mi)
- Elevation: 463 m (1,519 ft)

Population (2022)
  - Total: 5,910
  - Density: 37.45/km^{2} (97.0/sq mi)
- Demonym: Chã-pretense (Brazilian Portuguese)
- Time zone: UTC-03:00 (Brasília Time)
- Postal code: 57760-000
- HDI (2010): 0.575 – medium
- Website: chapreta.al.gov.br

Chã Preta (Central northeastern portuguese pronunciation: [ˈʃɐ̃ ˈpɾetɐ]) is a municipality located in the Brazilian state of Alagoas. Its population is 7,311 (2020) and its area is 201 km^{2} (78 sq mi).

== See also ==
- List of municipalities in Alagoas
