= Jacaré dos Homens =

Municipality in Alagoas, Brazil

- Municipality of Alagoas, Brazil
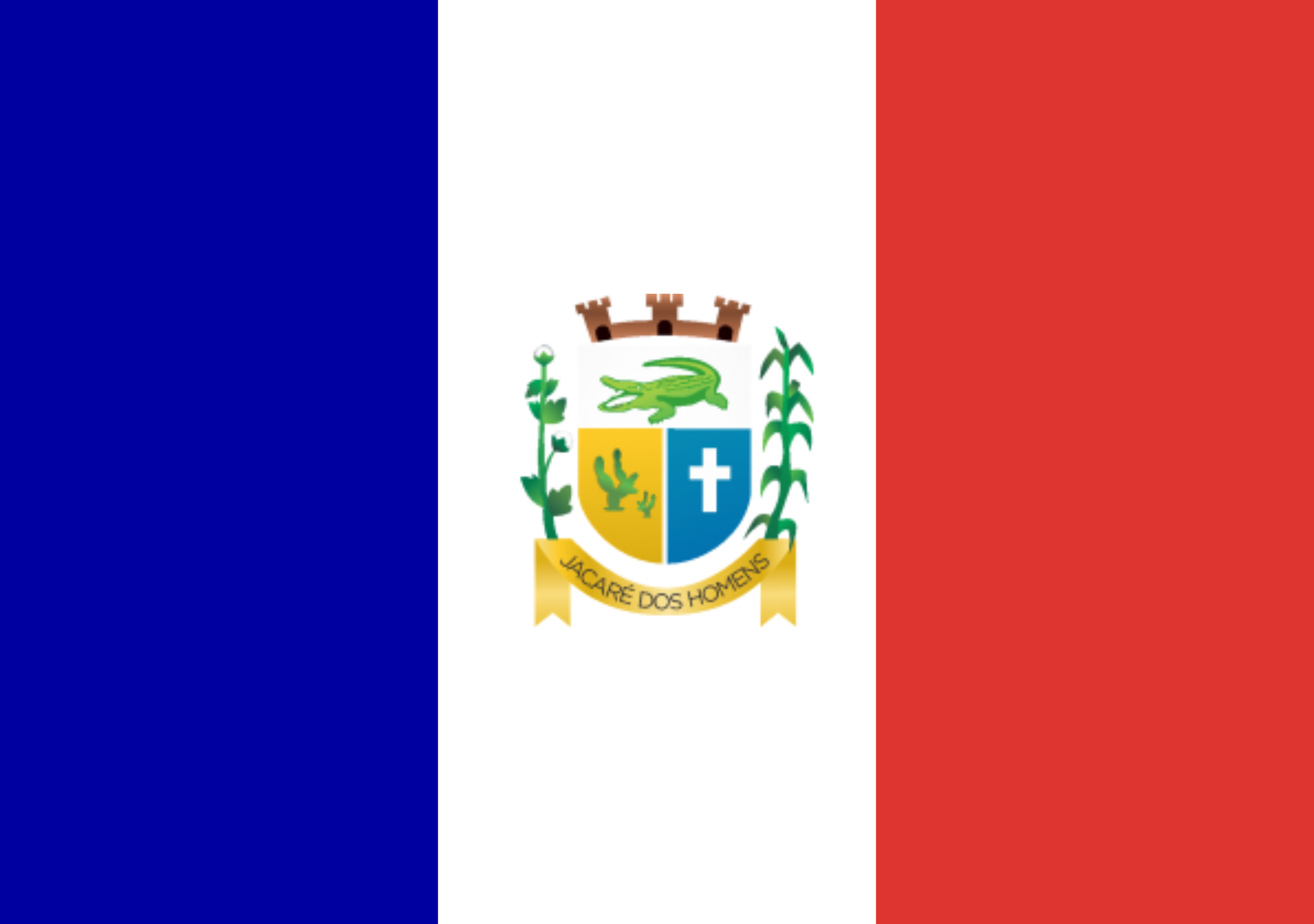
- Flag

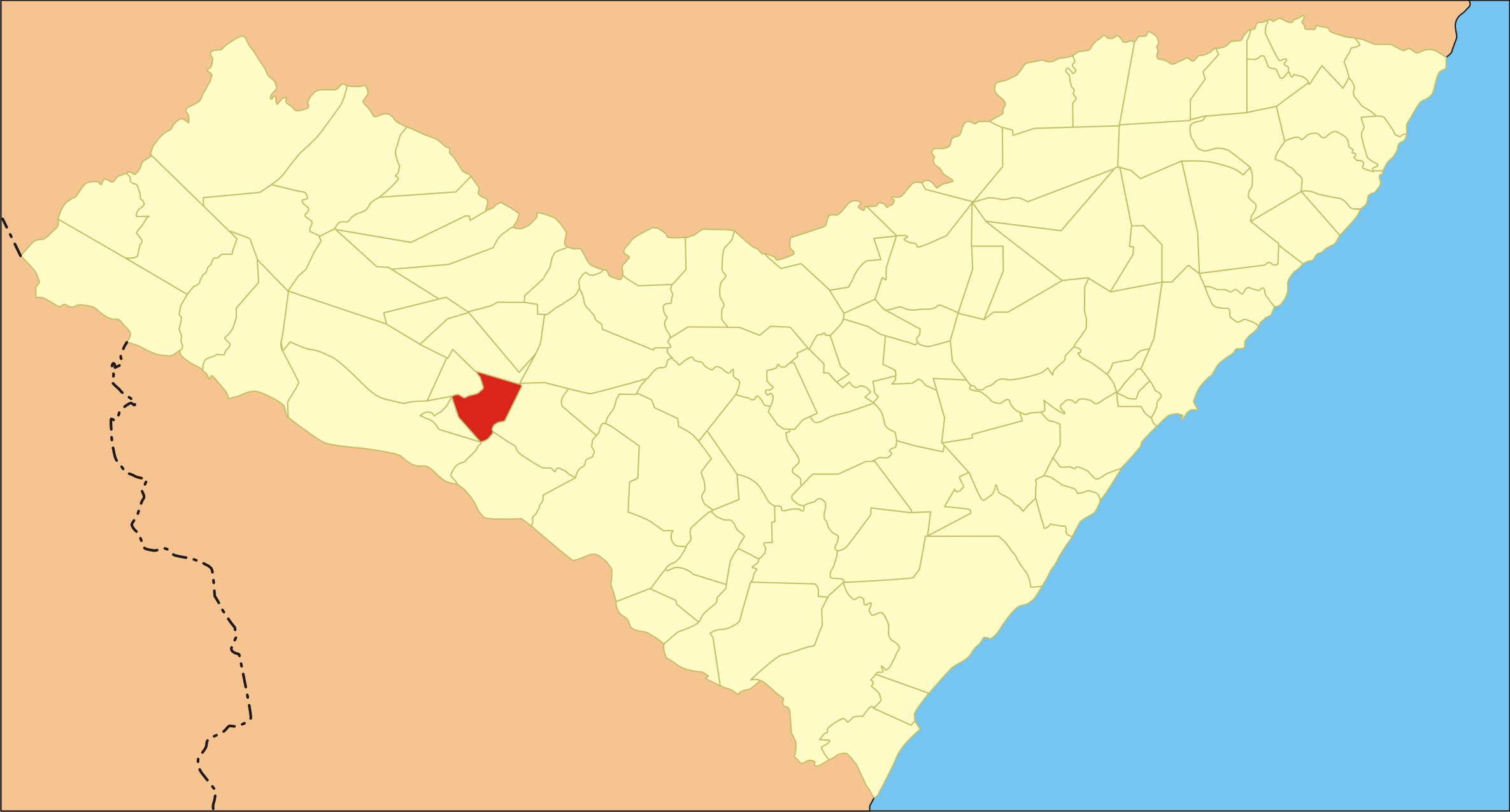
- Location of Jacaré dos Homens in Alagoas

- Location within Brazil Location within South America
- Coordinates: 9°38′9″S 37°12′18″W
- Country: Brazil
- Region: Northeast
- State: Alagoas
- Founded: 9 November 1957

Government
  - Mayor: Maria do Socorro Melo da Silva (MDB) (2025-2028)
  - Vice Mayor: Franklin Dantas Correia Cajé (PSB) (2025-2028)

Area
  - Total: 149.332 km^{2} (57.657 sq mi)
- Elevation: 135 m (443 ft)

Population (2022)
  - Total: 5,083
  - Density: 34.12/km^{2} (88.4/sq mi)
- Demonym: Jacarezeiro (Brazilian Portuguese)
- Time zone: UTC-03:00 (Brasília Time)
- Postal code: 57430-000
- HDI (2010): 0.583 – medium
- Website: jacaredoshomens.al.gov.br

Jacaré dos Homens (Central northeastern portuguese pronunciation: [ʒɐkɐˈɾɛ dʊˈzõːmi]) is a municipality in the western of the Brazilian state of Alagoas. Its population is 5,219 (2020) and its area is 142 km^{2}.

== See also ==
- List of municipalities in Alagoas
