= List of municipalities in Alagoas =

This is a list of the municipalities in the state of Alagoas (AL), located in the Northeast Region of Brazil. Alagoas is divided into 102 municipalities, which are grouped into 13 microregions, which are grouped into 3 mesoregions.

Map of Brazil with Alagoas highlighted

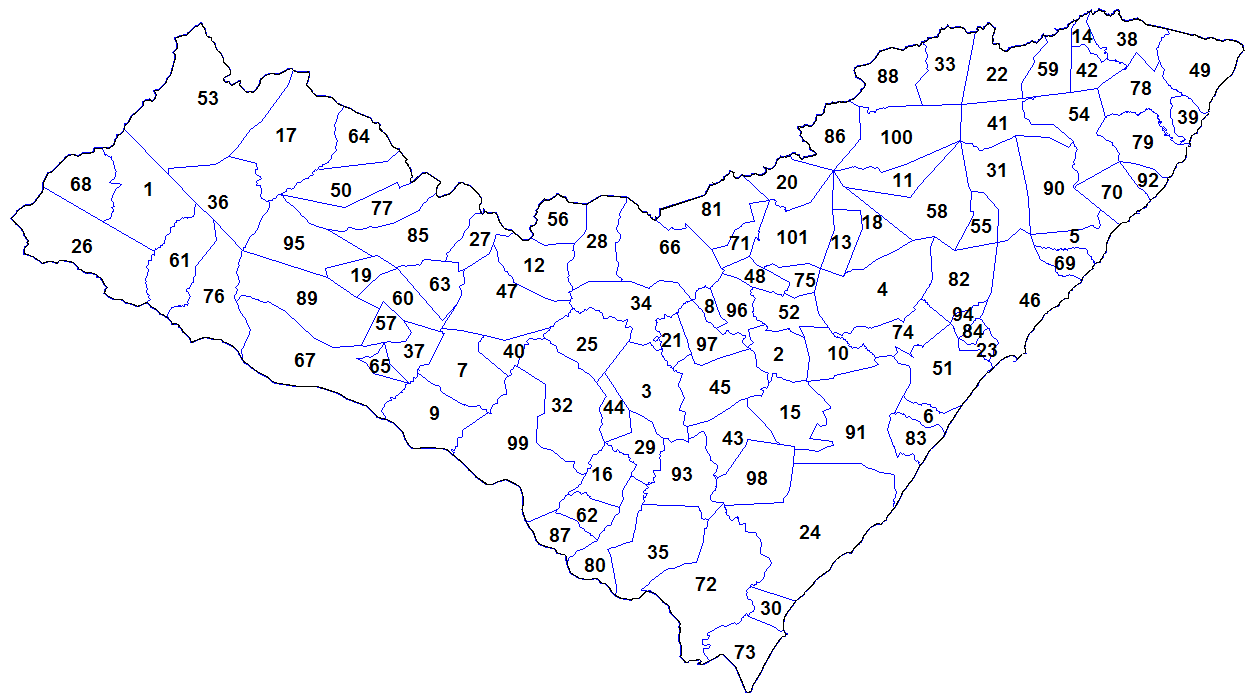
Municipalities of Alagoas, Brazil

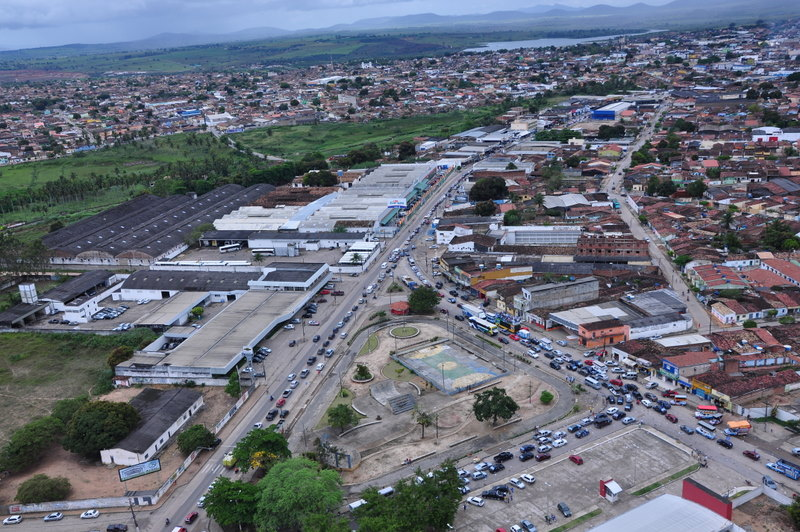
Arapiraca, the second largest city by population in Alagoas

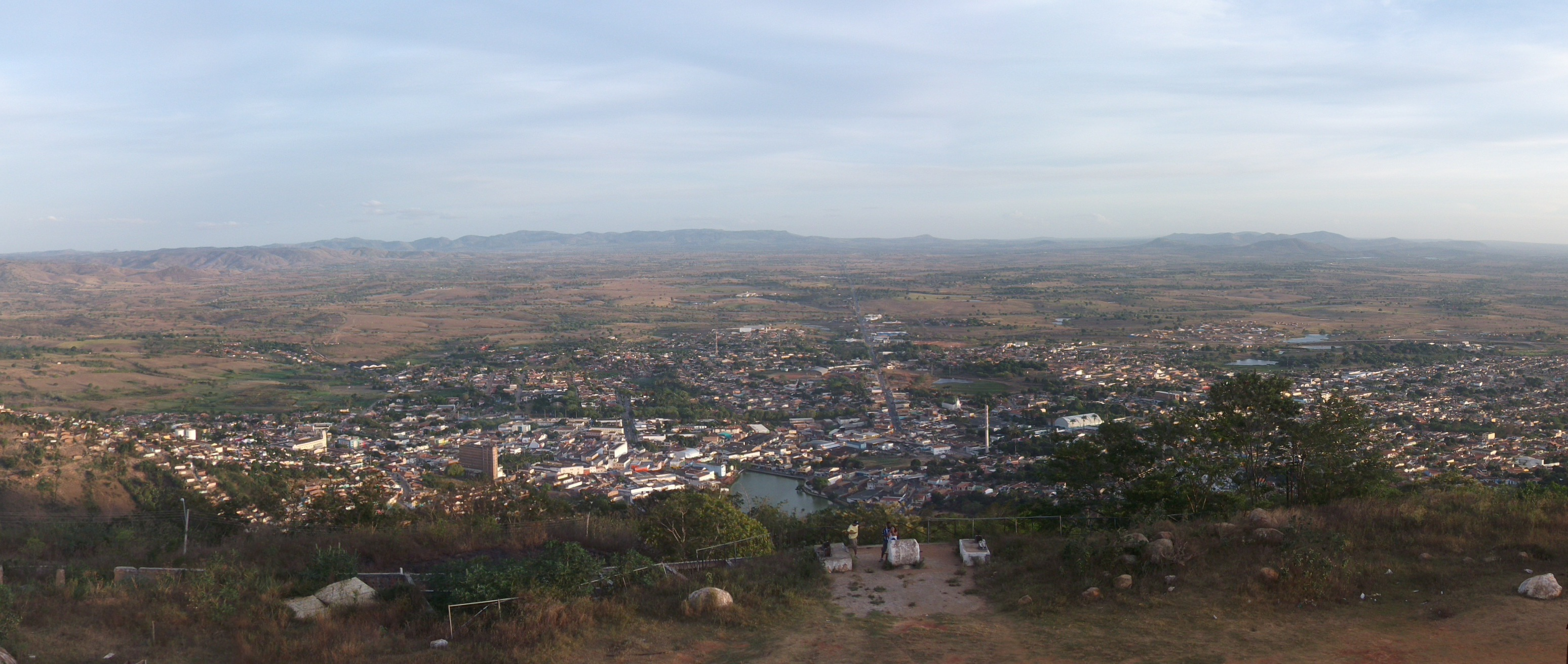
Palmeira dos Indios, Alagoas' third largest city by population

Mesoregion	Microregion	#	Municipality
Agreste Alagoano	Arapiraca	3	Arapiraca
Agreste Alagoano	Arapiraca	16	Campo Grande
Agreste Alagoano	Arapiraca	21	Coité do Nóia
Agreste Alagoano	Arapiraca	25	Craíbas
Agreste Alagoano	Arapiraca	29	Feira Grande
Agreste Alagoano	Arapiraca	32	Girau do Ponciano
Agreste Alagoano	Arapiraca	44	Lagoa da Canoa
Agreste Alagoano	Arapiraca	45	Limoeiro de Anadia
Agreste Alagoano	Arapiraca	93	São Sebastião
Agreste Alagoano	Arapiraca	97	Taquarana
Agreste Alagoano	Palmeira dos Índios	8	Belém
Agreste Alagoano	Palmeira dos Índios	12	Cacimbinhas
Agreste Alagoano	Palmeira dos Índios	28	Estrela de Alagoas
Agreste Alagoano	Palmeira dos Índios	34	Igaci
Agreste Alagoano	Palmeira dos Índios	48	Mar Vermelho
Agreste Alagoano	Palmeira dos Índios	52	Maribondo
Agreste Alagoano	Palmeira dos Índios	56	Minador do Negrão
Agreste Alagoano	Palmeira dos Índios	66	Palmeira dos Índios
Agreste Alagoano	Palmeira dos Índios	71	Paulo Jacinto
Agreste Alagoano	Palmeira dos Índios	81	Quebrangulo
Agreste Alagoano	Palmeira dos Índios	96	Tanque d'Arca
Agreste Alagoano	Traipu	62	Olho d'Água Grande
Agreste Alagoano	Traipu	87	São Brás
Agreste Alagoano	Traipu	99	Traipu
Leste Alagoano	Litoral Norte Alagoano	39	Japaratinga
Leste Alagoano	Litoral Norte Alagoano	49	Maragogi
Leste Alagoano	Litoral Norte Alagoano	70	Passo de Camaragibe
Leste Alagoano	Litoral Norte Alagoano	79	Porto de Pedras
Leste Alagoano	Litoral Norte Alagoano	92	São Miguel dos Milagres
Leste Alagoano	Maceió	5	Barra de Santo Antônio
Leste Alagoano	Maceió	6	Barra de São Miguel
Leste Alagoano	Maceió	23	Coqueiro Seco
Leste Alagoano	Maceió	46	Maceió (State Capital)
Leste Alagoano	Maceió	51	Marechal Deodoro
Leste Alagoano	Maceió	69	Paripueira
Leste Alagoano	Maceió	74	Pilar
Leste Alagoano	Maceió	82	Rio Largo
Leste Alagoano	Maceió	84	Santa Luzia do Norte
Leste Alagoano	Maceió	94	Satuba
Leste Alagoano	Mata Alagoana	4	Atalaia
Leste Alagoano	Mata Alagoana	11	Branquinha
Leste Alagoano	Mata Alagoana	13	Cajueiro
Leste Alagoano	Mata Alagoana	14	Campestre
Leste Alagoano	Mata Alagoana	18	Capela
Leste Alagoano	Mata Alagoana	22	Colônia Leopoldina
Leste Alagoano	Mata Alagoana	31	Flexeiras
Leste Alagoano	Mata Alagoana	38	Jacuípe
Leste Alagoano	Mata Alagoana	41	Joaquim Gomes
Leste Alagoano	Mata Alagoana	42	Jundiá
Leste Alagoano	Mata Alagoana	54	Matriz de Camaragibe
Leste Alagoano	Mata Alagoana	55	Messias
Leste Alagoano	Mata Alagoana	58	Murici
Leste Alagoano	Mata Alagoana	59	Novo Lino
Leste Alagoano	Mata Alagoana	78	Porto Calvo
Leste Alagoano	Mata Alagoana	90	São Luís do Quitunde
Leste Alagoano	Penedo	30	Feliz Deserto
Leste Alagoano	Penedo	35	Igreja Nova
Leste Alagoano	Penedo	72	Penedo
Leste Alagoano	Penedo	73	Piaçabuçu
Leste Alagoano	Penedo	80	Porto Real do Colégio
Leste Alagoano	São Miguel dos Campos	2	Anadia
Leste Alagoano	São Miguel dos Campos	10	Boca da Mata
Leste Alagoano	São Miguel dos Campos	15	Campo Alegre
Leste Alagoano	São Miguel dos Campos	24	Coruripe
Leste Alagoano	São Miguel dos Campos	91	Jequiá da Praia
Leste Alagoano	São Miguel dos Campos	43	Junqueiro
Leste Alagoano	São Miguel dos Campos	83	Roteiro
Leste Alagoano	São Miguel dos Campos	91	São Miguel dos Campos
Leste Alagoano	São Miguel dos Campos	98	Teotônio Vilela
Leste Alagoano	Serrana dos Quilombos	20	Chã Preta
Leste Alagoano	Serrana dos Quilombos	33	Ibateguara
Leste Alagoano	Serrana dos Quilombos	75	Pindoba
Leste Alagoano	Serrana dos Quilombos	86	Santana do Mundaú
Leste Alagoano	Serrana dos Quilombos	88	São José da Laje
Leste Alagoano	Serrana dos Quilombos	100	União dos Palmares
Leste Alagoano	Serrana dos Quilombos	101	Viçosa
Sertão Alagoano	Alagoana do Sertão do São Francisco	26	Delmiro Gouveia
Sertão Alagoano	Alagoana do Sertão do São Francisco	61	Olho d'Água do Casado
Sertão Alagoano	Alagoana do Sertão do São Francisco	76	Piranhas
Sertão Alagoano	Batalha	7	Batalha
Sertão Alagoano	Batalha	9	Belo Monte
Sertão Alagoano	Batalha	37	Jacaré dos Homens
Sertão Alagoano	Batalha	40	Jaramataia
Sertão Alagoano	Batalha	47	Major Isidoro
Sertão Alagoano	Batalha	57	Monteirópolis
Sertão Alagoano	Batalha	60	Olho d'Água das Flores
Sertão Alagoano	Batalha	63	Olivença
Sertão Alagoano	Santana do Ipanema	19	Carneiros
Sertão Alagoano	Santana do Ipanema	27	Dois Riachos
Sertão Alagoano	Santana do Ipanema	50	Maravilha
Sertão Alagoano	Santana do Ipanema	64	Ouro Branco
Sertão Alagoano	Santana do Ipanema	65	Palestina
Sertão Alagoano	Santana do Ipanema	67	Pão de Açúcar
Sertão Alagoano	Santana do Ipanema	77	Poço das Trincheiras
Sertão Alagoano	Santana do Ipanema	85	Santana do Ipanema
Sertão Alagoano	Santana do Ipanema	89	São José da Tapera
Sertão Alagoano	Santana do Ipanema	95	Senador Rui Palmeira
Sertão Alagoano	Serrana do Sertão Alagoano	1	Água Branca
Sertão Alagoano	Serrana do Sertão Alagoano	17	Canapi
Sertão Alagoano	Serrana do Sertão Alagoano	36	Inhapi
Sertão Alagoano	Serrana do Sertão Alagoano	53	Mata Grande
Sertão Alagoano	Serrana do Sertão Alagoano	68	Pariconha

== See also ==
- Geography of Brazil
- List of cities in Brazil
