= Coqueiro Seco =

Municipality of Alagoas, Brazil

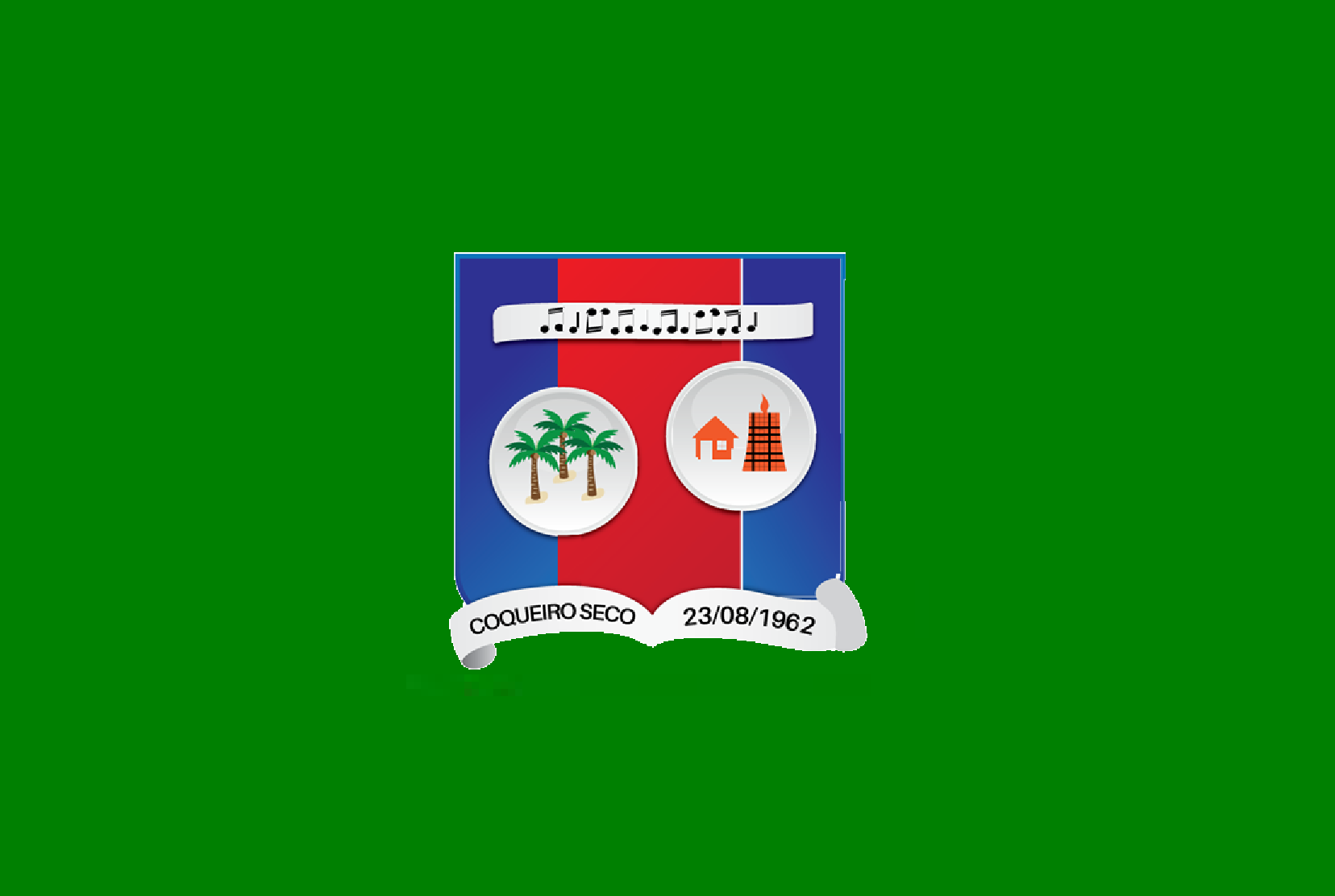
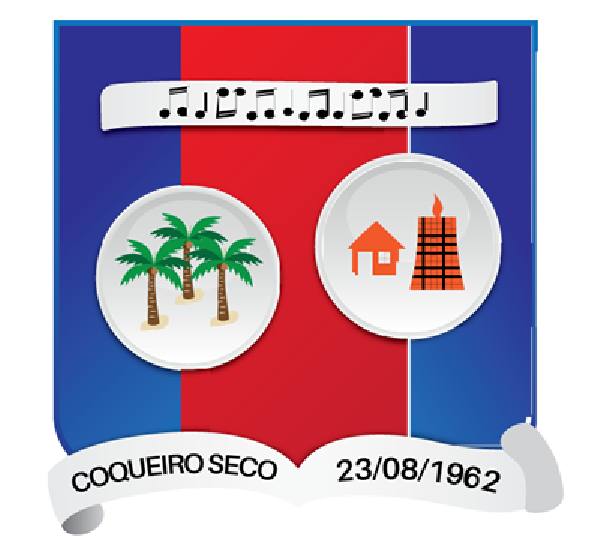
- Flag Coat of arms
- Nickname: "The city of coconut trees"
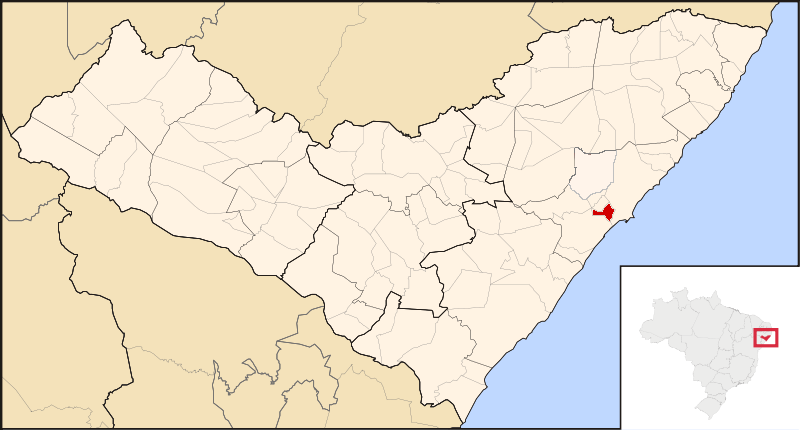
- Location of Coqueiro Seco

- Location within Brazil
- Coordinates: 9°38′16″S 35°48′10″W
- Country: Brazil
- Region: Northeast
- State: Alagoas
- Founded: 24 November 1962

Government
  - Mayor: Renato Tadeu Fragoso (PTB)

Area
  - Total: 40.4 km^{2} (15.6 sq mi)
- Elevation: 5 and 31 m (16 and 102 ft)

Population (2020)
  - Total: 5,864
  - Metro density: 129.21/km^{2} (334.7/sq mi)
- Time zone: UTC−3 (BRT)
- HDI (2000): 0.631 – medium

Coqueiro Seco (Central northeastern portuguese pronunciation: [koˈkeɾu ˈseːkʊ]) is a municipality located in the Brazilian state of Alagoas. Its population is 5,864 (2020) and its area is 40.4 km^{2} (15.6 sq mi).

Located on the shores of Lake Mundaú, Coqueiro Seco is named from the frequent meetings of merchants and travelers in the shade of a coconut tree of straw burned differentiated from the others, where they were made large business and nap.

The history account that some years later came to the region several missionaries of the order of Franciscans, which delighted up with the topography of the place, which had plans ups and downs, changing its name to Monte Santo. Get accustomed with the old name of the city, the people ignored the Franciscans and retained the name of Coqueiro Seco.

The only historical record found concerns the construction of the church coated with Portuguese tile and a large courtyard, which continues today as the matrix of the patron saint, in Portuguese: Nossa Senhora Mãe dos Homens, meaning Our Lady Mother of Men, built in the 17th century by the Portuguese man José Cabral. At census conducted in 1950 by the Brazilian Institute of Geography and Statistics (IBGE), Coqueiro Seco was mentioned as district of Rio Largo, with a population of 1,667 inhabitants.

When Satuba was elevated to the condition of autonomous municipality on August 20, 1960, Coqueiro Seco now belong to their territory, as a village. Only in 1962, the city was emancipated politically, officially installing its administrative autonomy on November 24, 1962 by means of the state law of August 23, 1962.

Coqueiro Seco has Lake Mundaú or Mundaú Lagoon with area of 23 km^{2} (8.9 sq mi) and 4 km long, straight, until Maceió its largest geographic accident and its main tourist attraction. The stories counted by fishermen and ancient inhabitants are also aside attraction. Featured also for the traditional festival of the patron saint, held in the month of January (January 31 or the last Sunday of this month) and the folklore groups, such as Pastoril, Reisado, Chegança, Marujada, Guerreiros and Baianas of Coqueiro Seco.

== Geography ==
Located in the central part of the coastal strip of the state of Alagoas, inserted in the east region of the state and on the side of Maceió, its state capital; the municipality Coqueiro Seco extends to an area of approximately 40.4 km^{2} (15.6 sq mi), corresponding to 0.145% of the state, 0.0026% of the Region and 0.0005% the whole Brazilian territory. Limits are: to the north with the City of Santa Luzia do Norte, the west and south with Marechal Deodoro, and the east with Maceió and Lake Mundaú, which gives access to the Atlantic Ocean through a complex of islands in your mouth next to the Pontal da Barra borough. The stream of Remedio is the boundary between the municipalities Coqueiro Seco and Marechal Deodoro, being on the Coqueiro Seco side the village of Cadóz and Marechal Deodoro side the village of Santa Rita.

== Economy ==
The municipality is rich in oil, and it has the company of Petrosynergy Ltda. as authorized by ANP, Brazil's Oil National Agency, to produce crude oil. Trade is based in small markets, butcher shop and grocery, bakeries and clothing stores; whose products were from Maceió.

The primary sector of the economy is supported in the monoculture of sugar cane and occupies almost all rural area of the municipality. Agriculture is mainly of subsistence, with their participation in the production, area harvested and the economy is not considered representative in the state. The livestock has up been above of agriculture, but without much impact on the Metropolitan Region of Maceio. On the banks of the lagoon there is the fish and extraction of sururu; besides, in some isolated areas of the boards and slopes, highlights are the coconut trees, producing for the food industry, and some of orchard crops such as cashew, mango and jaqueira tree, now called fruit for local consumption.

Close to the village of Cadóz is the Polo Cloroquímico, Chlorine and Chemical Pole of Marechal Deodoro with their industries, refining, polyethylene production; as well as the proximity of Maceió are two appealing to the labour-spot. Access to the council whether the state road AL-101 (south) and BR 316, a federal road, or in a boat on a lake known by the population as simply boat, which is the crossing of the port city to the port of the Levada neighbourhood in Maceió.

== Education ==
There are 2,000 vacancies in state and municipal networks for teaching children, basic and medium through nurseries and schools. Access to teaching technical and higher is in Maceió through institutions like the Federal Institute of Alagoas: IFAL, the Federal University of Alagoas: UFAL and several private colleges and universities. The council is supported by various initiatives of governments federal, state and municipal levels for the eradication of child labour and illiteracy: Program for the Eradication of Child Labor - PETI (Programa de Erradicação do Trabalho Infantil), Family Scholarship (Bolsa Família), etc.

== Health ==
Two posts of basic care and one post-care with six maternity beds at the headquarters of the municipality, in addition to a post of basic care in the village Cadóz. The emergency care are referred to the Emergency Unit Armando Lages in the nearby state capital.

== Historical and cultural heritage ==
=== Church of Our Lady Mother of Men ===
The church of Coqueiro Seco, under the invocation of Our Lady Mother of Men, was founded by Father Jose Bernardo Cabral (died 1814), licensed by the bishop of Pernambuco D. Diogo de Jesus Jardim on September 2, 1790. On March 2, 1791 obtained the parish priest of then authorization for he celebrates masses. On July 21 this year, gave up the granting of 40 days of forgiveness to all people who, in the presence of the image of the saint, they prayed a Save-Queen, and thus began the clerical works.

On September 4, 1805, the Apostolic Ambassador, in Lisbon, gave one hundred days of indulgence for whom the chapel prayed for hundred days and others for whom prayed under the image of Bom Jesus dos Remédios an Our Father, an Ave Maria and a Gloria Patri for the Pope, for the exaltation of the Church and the spiritual and temporal well of Queen Mary I of Portugal and the Prince Regent D. John. The chapel, a subsidiary of the parish of Santa Luzia do Norte, became known for their images, especially at Nativity of the Divine Virgin. The founder of the church has encouraged the formation of a group of female deacon subjected to votes of purity, even after the termination of the institution, these religious led ahead with the task of maintaining the decorum of worship and promotion of brilliant festivities.

There are reports historic passage of the Emperor D. Pedro II between the end of 1859 and beginning of 1860, in his trip in the provinces of the northeast of Brazil, for Maceió and surrounding communities. Among the places visited by D. Pedro II is a parish of Coqueiro Seco and its beautiful church of Portuguese tiles and objects of Sacred Relic.

The Journal of the Instituto Archeologico and Geographico Alagoano (1874) published article of Nicodemus Moreira de Souza Jobim (written in 1869) on the church of Coqueiro Seco with news about the music of their main party.

The feast of Our Lady Mother of Men remains today one of the most important religious celebrations of Alagoas. In the procession that party operates today, the band's music Musical Society Professor Francisco de Carvalho Pedrosa and is the apex traditional fireworks fires in the lagoon in front of the church as a cascade clamp; an unforgettable spectacle.

=== Church of Our Lady of Remedies ===
The Church of Our Lady of Remedies is an old relic of the years 1850, built inside Atlantic Forest, near the banks of Lake Mundaú and the stream of Remedio (remedy), in the village of Cadóz.

This is a Sacred Relic, a work odd that, by its historical value, religious, architectural and especially the greatness of the mass human that it worships the faith for more than one hundred and fifty years, could not disappear, and to try to reverse the framework that was virtually destroyed by the action of the storm, time, the termites and bats the TV, radio and telecommunications office Arnon de Mello coordinated the full restoration of the church in 2005.

Its entire structure was damaged, not to have the slightest manifestation of the public authorities to prevent the total extinction of that Church consecrated as Miracle.

The restoration work, which started at the end of March 2005, was fully completed in July of that year when the church was opened again. To document the project, the Arnon de Mello office published a photographic record of the temple’s condition, which is archived as part of the history of Alagoas.

Emotion and faith marked the inauguration of the works to reform the Church of Our Lady of Remedies prestigious by the community. Relatives of João Duda Calado, owner of the land where is the small church, the former President of Brazil Fernando Collor, director of the institute then, and various authorities attended the celebration of a mass by the parish priest of the community, Father João Carnaúba.

=== Musical Society Professor Francisco de Carvalho Pedrosa ===
The Musical Society Professor Francisco de Carvalho Pedrosa is an association of music teachers and professors intended for education, founded in the early 20th century. Among various musical compositions made in this society it is the "Hymn of Patron Saint Our Lady Mother of Men", a composition of the masters of that band in the 1960s, Manoel Leandro Simplício, the frevo "Two drinks, a drop" of the musician military Anízio da Silva Pinto, master of the counter-band spot in the 1970s and other popular pieces such as bolero "Passion of Men" (author unknown), among others.

=== Folklore Groups of Coqueiro Seco ===
The council is full of folklore groups of the culture of Alagoas as Pastoril, Reisado, Chegança, Marujada and also the tradition of Guerreiro are rooted. These groups are presented in the most diverse festivals throughout the year. In Coqueiro Seco there is a dance of Baianas which participates that folklore groups.

According to historians, the Baianas come from a variation of the rural Maracatu of Pernambuco state, in the south of that state were called Samba, Matuto or Bahianal and have influences of Pastoril, see the blue and red strings inserted in Pernambuco's folklore which was carried to the culture of Alagoas. Happening in the Christmas cycle, since December 24 to January 6. They suffer influence of Coco (coconut), in musical forms and the everyday issues that are sung. The joy of Music of Baianas is extremely contagious, according to some authors the pace is called Pancada Motor (Motor Knock). They were a strong tradition of Alagoas, but today there are only a few groups in the state.

The group of folkloric The Baiana of Coqueiro Seco was off from 1958 until 2003, but the collective memory is a powerful weapon in addition to the traditional repertoire already composed new songs and is able to bring the participation of some young people. Today the Baianas in Alagoas are formed by women of the third age in its majority. All people in the group besides playing a Baiana dance is also the Chegança Silva Jardim, group already registered in the municipality which participates that folklore groups.

== See also ==
- List of municipalities in Alagoas
