= Sinking of Maceió =

Geological event

Maceió ground sinking
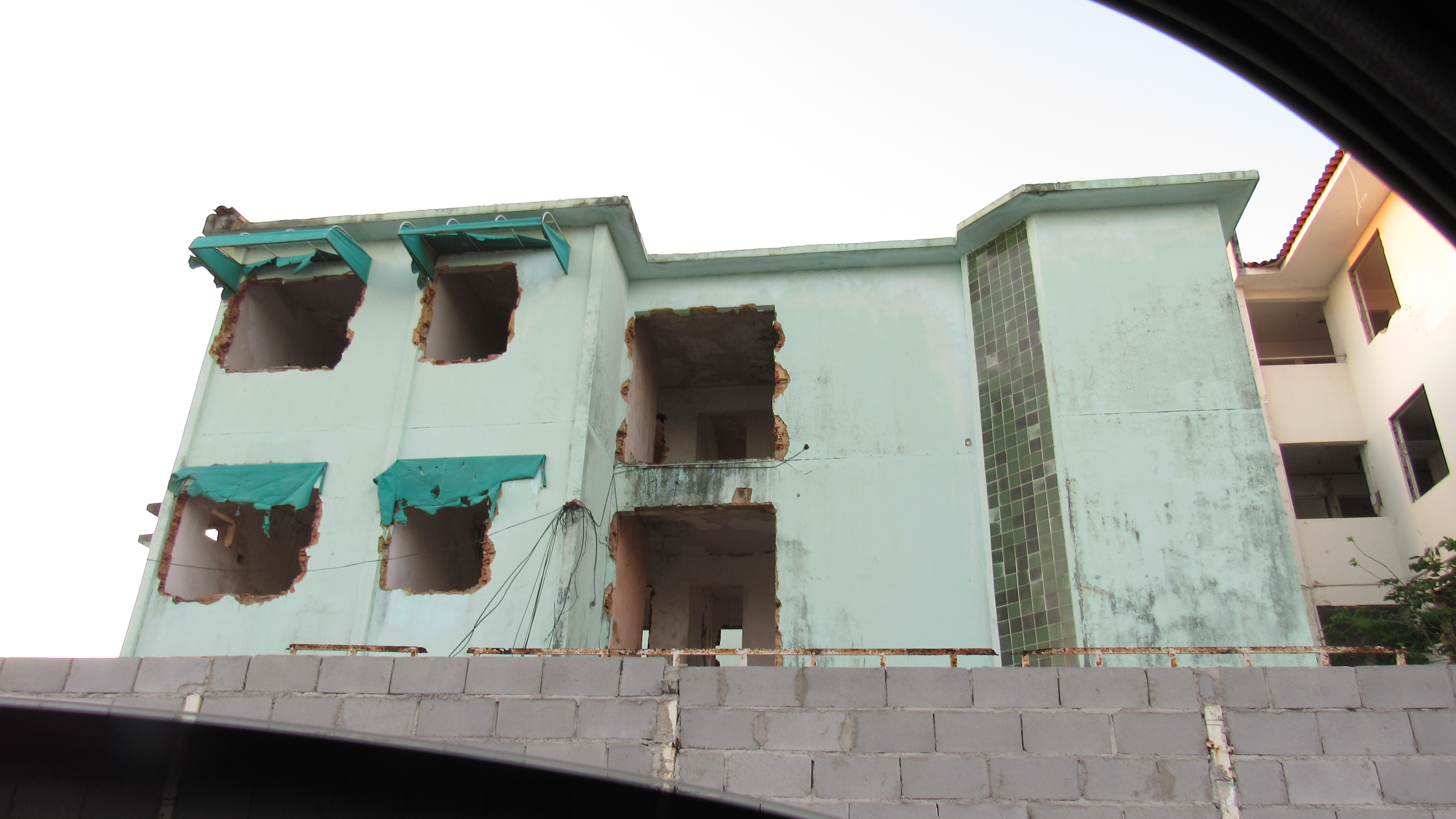
- Damaged building in the Pinheiro neighborhood
- Date: February 2018 – present
- Location: Maceió, Alagoas, Brazil
- Cause: rock salt mining
- Property damage: around 14.000 buildings
- Displaced: around 60.000 people

The sinking of Maceió is a geological process of soil subsidence in several neighborhoods of the Brazilian city of Maceió, capital of the state of Alagoas, of an anthropogenic nature, caused by the inadequate exploitation and consequent collapse of the rock salt mines of the Brazilian mining company Braskem.

The city is undergoing a slow process of soil subsidence that is causing damage to various structures, such as streets, houses and urban infrastructure. Around 60,000 people have been forced to leave their homes and properties. Entire neighborhoods are at risk of destruction, such as Pinheiro, Bom Parto, Mutange, Bebedouro and part of Farol.

== History and causes ==
The subsidence has been attributed to the impact of four decades of mining the soil to extract rock salt, an ore used to manufacture items such as caustic soda and PVC, by Braskem. The first cracks in the ground were identified in the Pinheiro neighborhood in February 2018, after heavy rains. Two weeks later, the asphalt in some streets had caved in and cracks in buildings had widened following an earthquake.

Researchers from the Federal University of Alagoas (UFAL) have been pointing out the risk of ground subsidence in Maceió due to mining activities since at least 2010, and warnings were issued thirty years earlier, in the 1980s, by two professors from the university.

It was only a year after these episodes, in May 2019, that the Geological Survey of Brazil (CPRM), a research body linked to the Ministry of Mines and Energy, confirmed the relationship between the ground subsidence and the company's mining activities, in a report presented at the headquarters of the Federal Court in Alagoas. Throughout the exploration period, the company exploited 35 mines, and over time, some of them ended up merging into cavities more than 100 meters wide.

According to the study, the extraction of rock salt was carried out improperly, destabilizing the pre-existing caves and causing the fissures. At that time, the risk area, which until then was considered to be concentrated in the Pinheiro neighborhood, was extended to the Mutange and Bebedouro neighborhoods. New areas were identified later.

On 30 November 2023, the city of Maceió decreed a state of emergency in the municipality for 180 days due to the "imminent collapse" of a mine belonging to Braskem in the area of Mundaú Lagoon, in the Mutange neighborhood. The city's civil defense authority reported the partial collapse of the mine on 10 December.

== Affected population ==
There is no precise data on the number of people affected by the ground-sinking disaster. In May 2022, the Municipality of Maceió held a meeting with the Brazilian Institute of Geography and Statistics (IBGE) to request support in collecting and cross-referencing the information with other bodies of the Municipal Administration.

An estimated 55,000 people have been affected since 2018, including residents and businesses, and 14,000 properties have been condemned in the five neighborhoods affected: Bebedouro, Bom Parto, Farol, Mutange and Pinheiro. The city of Maceió's current estimate is that 64,000 people have been affected.

The problems caused by the sinking, which include environmental, social, and economic issues, are wide-ranging and are still being investigated. In addition to dissatisfaction with the agreements proposed by Braskem, residents are still living with accelerated growth in the population of stray cats and mosquitoes; some refuse to leave the risk areas, which have been periodically updated on official City Hall maps since 2019.

== Cultural damage ==
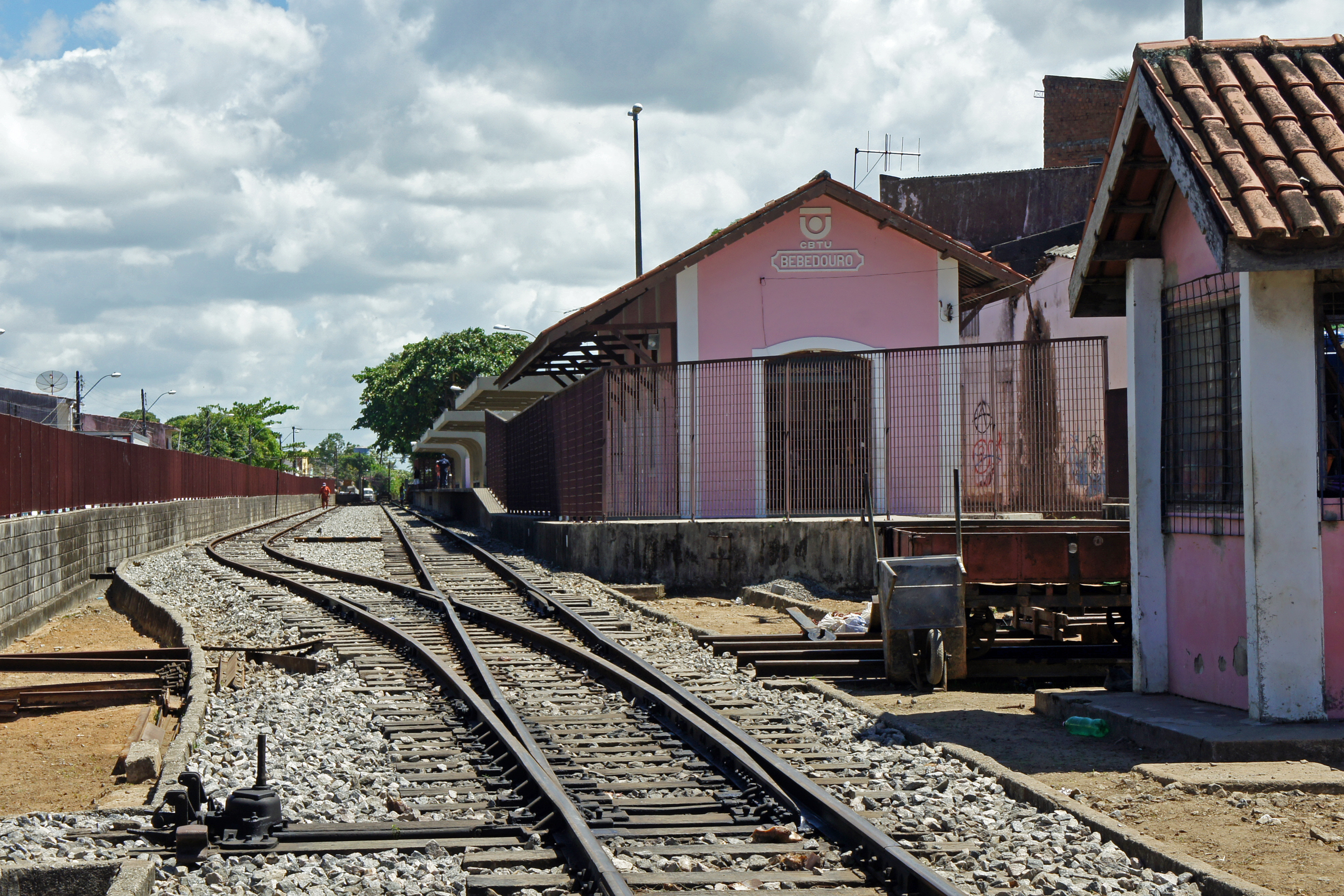
Station in the Bebedouro neighborhood of Maceió, one of the oldest in the city and the region most affected by the collapse

The Bebedouro neighborhood, one of those affected by the subsidence, is one of the oldest districts in Maceió, dating back 200 years. Buildings listed by the state and municipal historical heritage departments are located there, such as:

- Solar Nunes Leite, built between 1880 and 1890 by commander Jacintho Nunes Leite.
- Asylo das Órphans Desvalidas de Nossa Senhora do Bom Conselho, a 1877 building created to house orphans of the Paraguayan War and which operated as a public school until the sinking process began;
- St. Anthony of Padua Church, was built by commander Jacintho Nunes Leite in 1873, and remains open, despite being in an area of risk.

The City of Maceió has made an initial survey of 20 addresses with properties of historical interest among the neighborhoods affected but has not yet made it public. Braskem also states that it is carrying out a study on the situation of the historic heritage affected.

== Authorities' response ==
Following the submission of a report by the Federal Geological Survey, the federal government acknowledged, on 28 May 2019, the state of public calamity in Maceió, facilitating the possibility of financial and technical support for the region. The Prefecture had already declared a state of calamity months earlier, in March 2019.

On 30 December 2019, an agreement was signed between the Alagoas State Public Prosecutor's Office (MPE-AL), the Alagoas State Public Defender's Office (DPE-AL), the Federal Public Prosecutor's Office (MPF), the Federal Public Defender's Office (DPU) and the Braskem mining company. The document, called the "Agreement to Support the Eviction of Risk Areas", aims to establish parameters for the relocation of residents and financial compensation for those affected and property owners in the affected neighborhoods.

The Maceio City Hall created the Integrated Management Office for the Adoption of Measures to Address the Impacts of the Sinking of Neighborhoods (GGI Bairros), through Decree No. 9.037 of 6 January 2021. Among other functions, the body is responsible for listening to and talking to the actors involved in the process and other public authorities and institutions.

In October 2019, an External Commission was set up in the Chamber of Deputies to monitor the damage caused by the sinking and held public hearings and official visits to the region.

== Lawsuits ==
Braskem does not officially admit to having caused the disaster, but signed an agreement in the Alagoas courts that provides for the payment of more than 12 billion reais to compensate residents and shopkeepers, as well as the relocation of public facilities such as schools and health units.

A group of Maceió residents, represented by three law firms, have filed a lawsuit against Braskem in Rotterdam, the Netherlands, claiming that the compensation offered by the company does not cover all the damages. On 17 May 2022, the residents of the affected areas were heard by the Rotterdam District Court.

On 21 September 2022, the Court ruled that it had jurisdiction to hear the case and admitted the action against the petrochemical company, since three of its subsidiaries operate in Dutch territory.

On 1 November 2024, 20 people affiliated with Braskem were indicted by the Federal Police of Brazil on charges of damage to public property and environmental crimes relating to the sinking.

== See also ==
- Environmental issues in Brazil
- Mariana dam disaster
- Brumadinho dam disaster
- 2019 Northeast Brazil oil spill
- Halite
