= Mundaú Lagoon =

Mundaú Lagoon Lagoa Mundaú
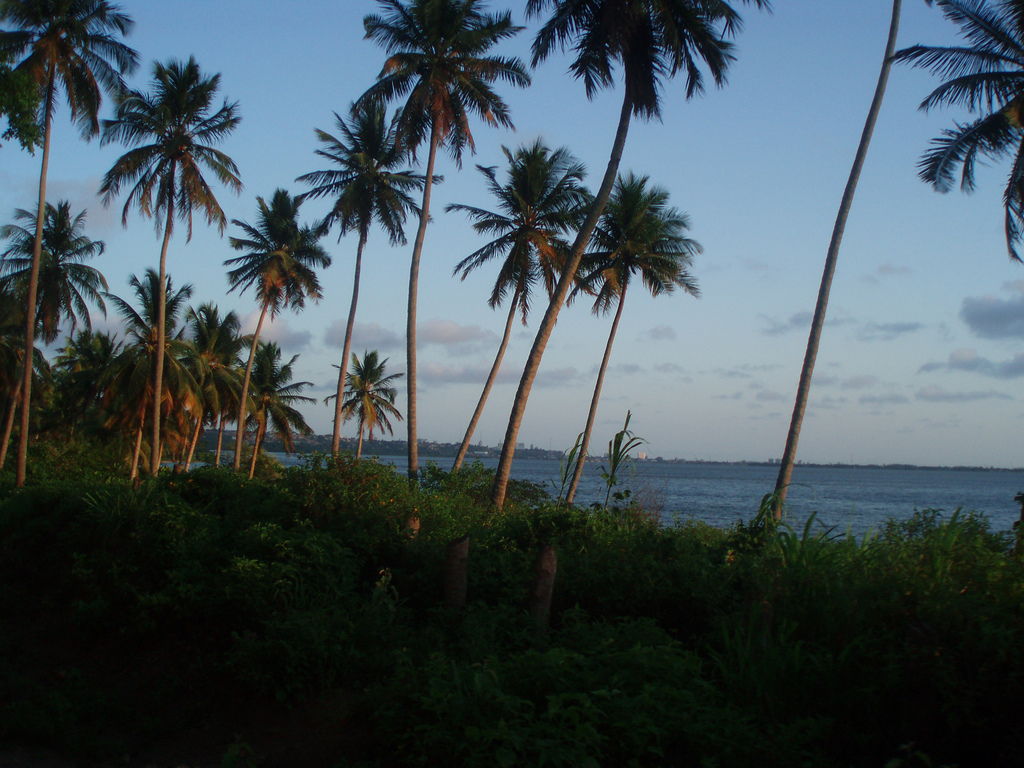
- Mundaú Lagoon

- Location within Brazil
- Location: Santa Luzia do Norte, Coqueiro Seco, Alagoas
- Coordinates: 9.633°S 35.783°W
- Lake type: estuarine lagoon
- Primary inflows: Paraíba do Meio River
- Primary outflows: Atlantic Ocean
- Basin countries: Brazil
- Max. length: 14.22 km (8.84 mi)
- Max. width: 4.22 km (2.62 mi)
- Surface area: 23 km^{2} (8.9 sq mi)
- Average depth: 2 m (6 ft 7 in)
- Max. depth: 4 m (13 ft)
- Surface elevation: 0 m (0 ft)
- Frozen: never
- Islands: numerous islands and islets

Mundaú Lagoon is an estuarine lagoon situated west of Maceió, capital city of Alagoas state, in Brazil. Its total area is 24 km^{2} (9.3 sq mi). The lake receives the Mundaú River, and is connected to the Atlantic Ocean and Manguaba Lagoon by a network of canals which cross the plain forming a lot of little islands. The lagoon contains to large mangrove and numerous types of fish, crabs, shrimps and shellfish. Mundaú Lagoon is the northernmost of several coastal lakes with the same features, including Manguaba, Roteiro and Jequiá lagoons.

Besides Maceió, two other municipalities are located on its edge, the little towns of Santa Luzia do Norte and Coqueiro Seco.

== Pollution problems ==
The natural environment of Mundaú Lagoon is affected by pollution problems, mainly due to urban sewage dispensing along its shore close to downtown Maceió. This compromises the communities who makes a living from the fishing on the lagoon.

This is not the only pollution problem surrounding Maceió. The Riacho Salgadinho is also the destination for most of the sewage system in Maceió downtown. In the past years, several politicians have made promises of putting sewage treatment stations to alleviate the problems caused by the pollution during the rainy season, but limited progress has been made.

Recently a new threat has arisen to the ecosystem of the Mundaú lagoon, the mining of rock salt by Braskem company.

== See also ==
- Sinking of Maceió
