= Paraíba River =

The Paraíba River may refer to three rivers in Brazil:

- Paraíba do Norte River, in Paraíba state of northeastern Brazil
- Paraíba do Meio River, in Alagoas state of northeastern Brazil
- Paraíba do Sul River, in São Paulo and Rio de Janeiro states of southeastern Brazil

== See also ==
- Paraíba (disambiguation)
