= Teotônio Vilela =

Municipality in Alagoas, Brazil

- Municipality
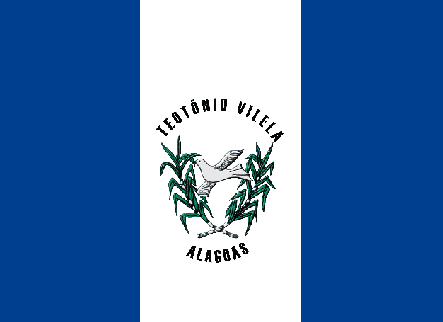
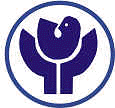
- Flag Coat of arms

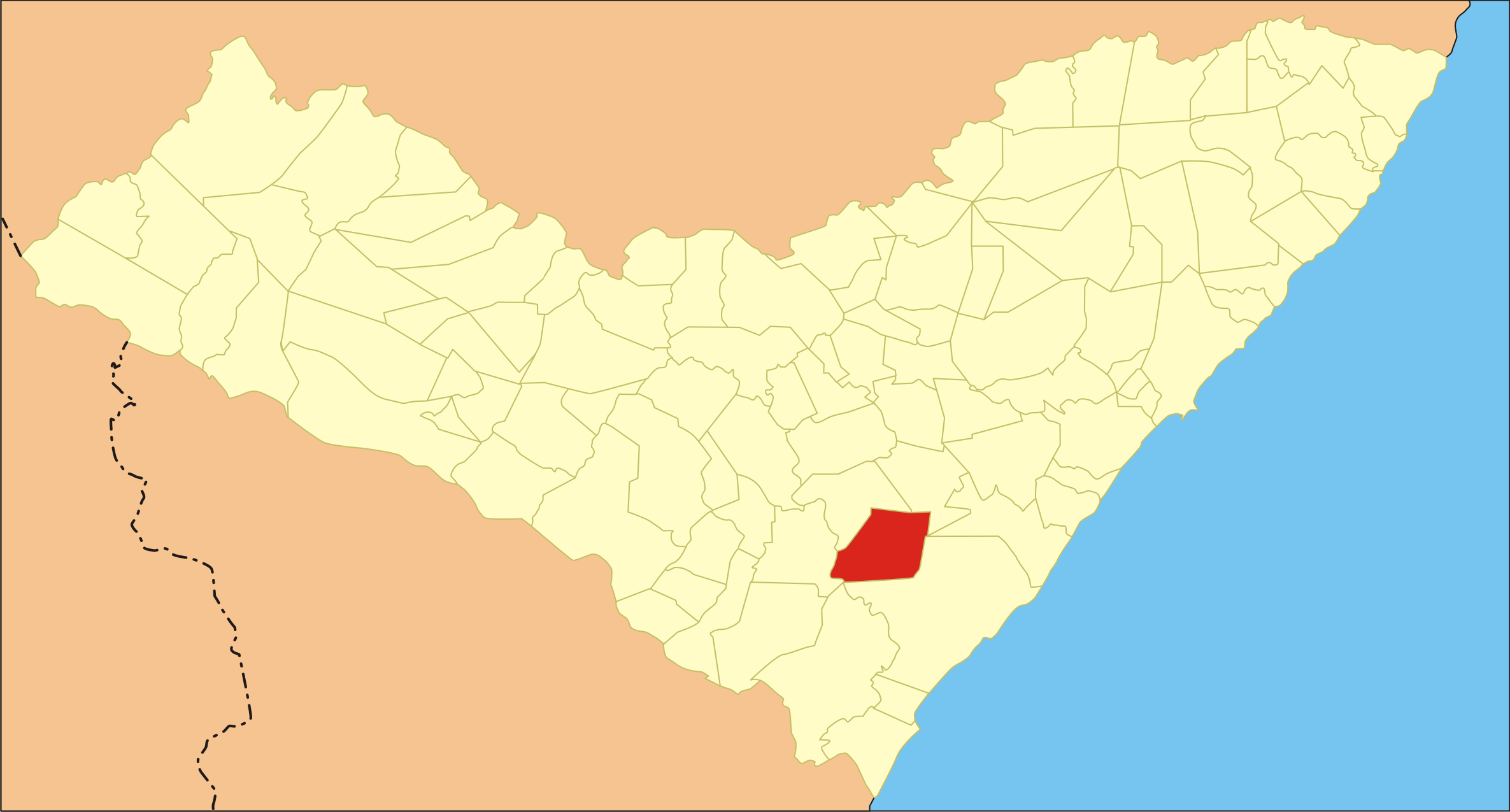
- Location in Alagoas state

- Location in Brazil
- Coordinates: 09°54′38″S 36°21′20″W
- Country: Brazil
- Region: Northeast
- State: Alagoas

Area
  - Total: 298 km^{2} (115 sq mi)

Population (2020)
  - Total: 44,372
  - Density: 149/km^{2} (386/sq mi)
- Time zone: UTC-03:00 (BRT)

Teotônio Vilela (Central northeastern portuguese pronunciation: [tɛɔˈtõnjw viˈlɛlɐ]) is a municipality located in the western of the Brazilian state of Alagoas. Its population was 44,372 (2020) and its area is 298 km^{2} (115 sq mi).

In 2021 Bolsonaro visited it on his 1000-day-in-office celebration.
