= Satuba =

Municipality of Alagoas, Brazil

- Municipality of Alagoas, Brazil
- Flag Coat of arms
- Etymology: Probably named after the saúva (Atta) ant, which lived in the area
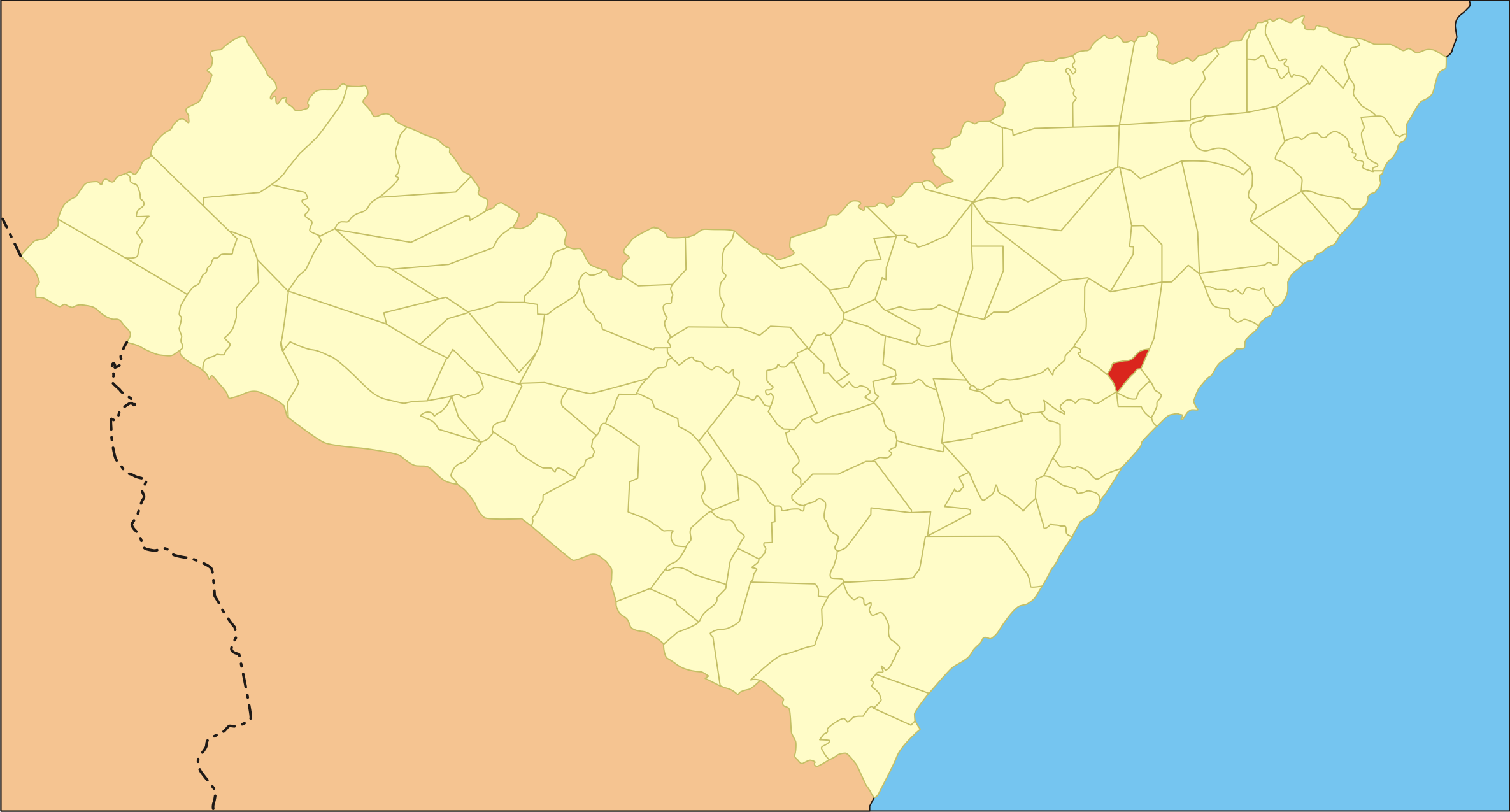
- Location of Satuba in Alagoas

- Location within Brazil Location within South America
- Coordinates: 9°34′10″S 35°49′26″W
- Country: Brazil
- Region: Northeast
- State: Alagoas
- Founded: 23 July 1960

Government
  - Mayor: Diogenes José Neto de Amorim (PP) (2025-2028)
  - Vice Mayor: Luis Carlos Alves de Lira (MDB) (2025-2028)

Area
  - Total: 41.268 km^{2} (15.934 sq mi)
- Elevation: 6 m (20 ft)

Population (2022)
  - Total: 24,278
  - Density: 588.3/km^{2} (1,524/sq mi)
- Demonym: Satubense (Brazilian Portuguese)
- Time zone: UTC-03:00 (Brasília Time)
- Postal code: 57120-000
- HDI (2010): 0.660 – medium
- Website: satuba.al.gov.br

Satuba (Central northeastern portuguese pronunciation: [saˈtubɐ]) is a municipality located in the Brazilian state of Alagoas. Its population was 13,936 (2020) and its area is 43 km^{2}.

== See also ==
- List of municipalities in Alagoas
