= Campo Alegre, Alagoas =

Municipality in Alagoas, Brazil

Campo Alegre
- Municipality of Alagoas, Brazil
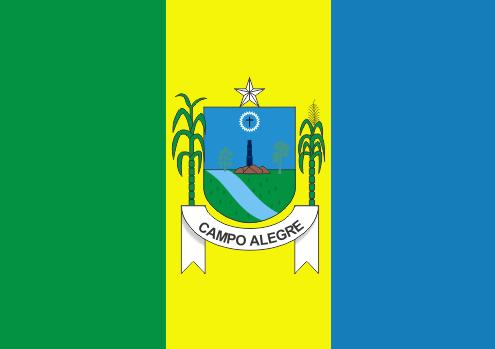
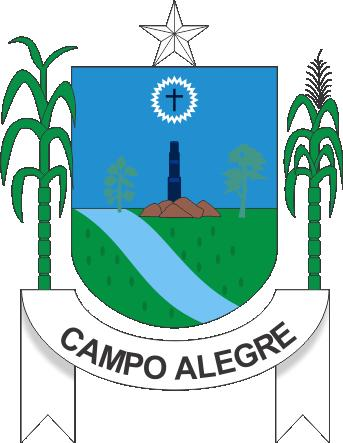
- Flag Coat of arms

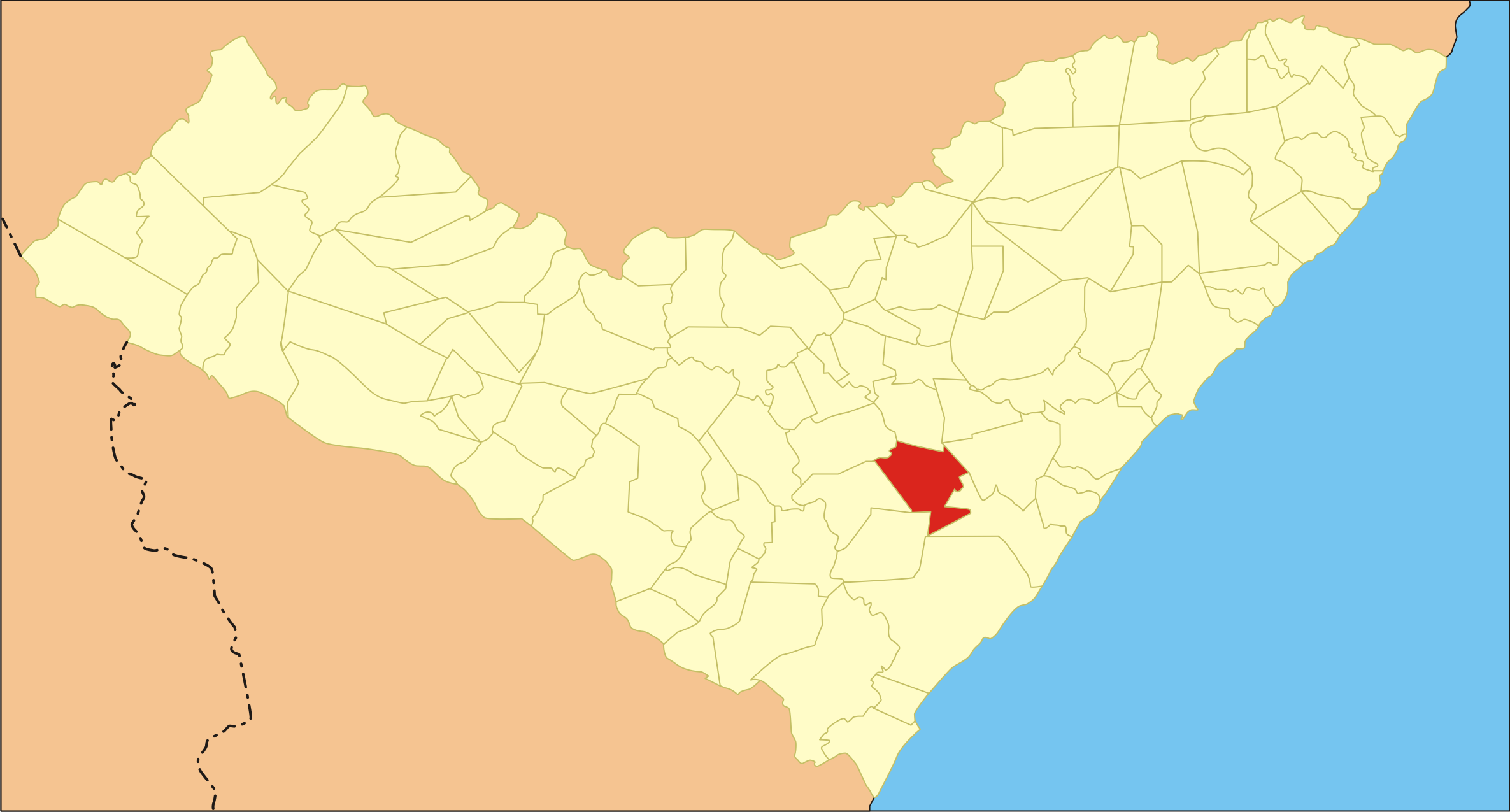
- Location of Campo Alegre in Alagoas

- Location within Brazil Location within South America
- Coordinates: 9°46′55″S 36°21′3″W
- Country: Brazil
- Region: Northeast
- State: Alagoas
- Founded: 8 June 1960

Government
  - Mayor: Pauline de Fátima Pereira Albuquerque (PP) (2025-2028)
  - Vice Mayor: Leonardo de Paula Monteiro (UNIÃO) (2025-2028)

Area
  - Total: 312.726 km^{2} (120.744 sq mi)
- Elevation: 106 m (348 ft)

Population (2022)
  - Total: 32,106
  - Density: 102.66/km^{2} (265.9/sq mi)
- Demonym: Campo-alegrense (Brazilian Portuguese)
- Time zone: UTC-03:00 (Brasília Time)
- Postal code: 57250-000, 57254-000
- HDI (2010): 0.570 – medium
- Website: campoalegre.al.gov.br

Campo Alegre (Central northeastern portuguese pronunciation: [ˈkɐ̃pʊ ɐˈlɛɡɾi]) is a municipality located in the Brazilian state of Alagoas. Its population is 57,537 (2020 est) and its area is 308 km^{2} (119 sq mi).

== See also ==
- List of municipalities in Alagoas
