= Jacintho José Nunes Leite =

Coronel Jacintho José Nunes Leite
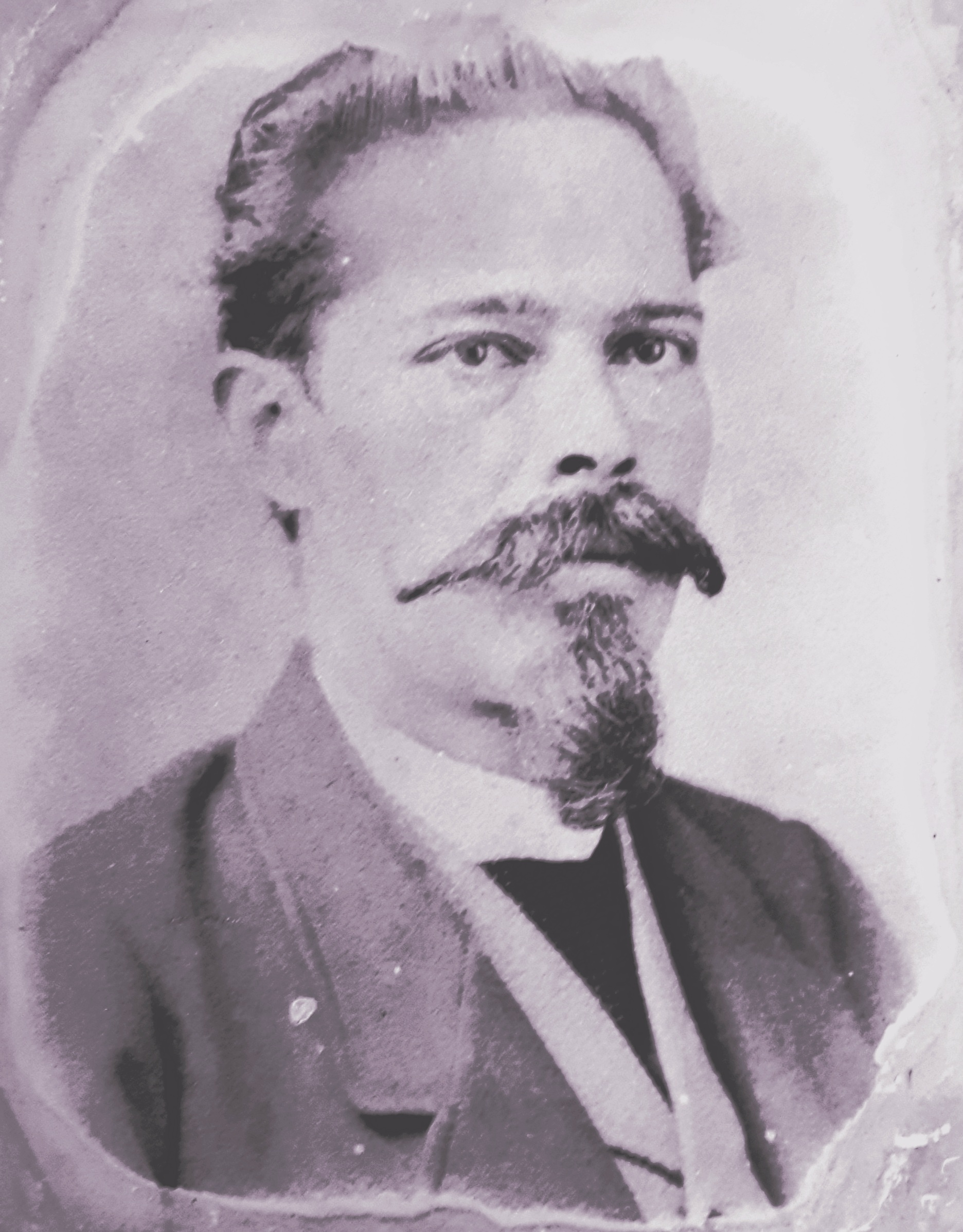
- Born: January 18, 1840; Oliveira de Azeméis, Aveiro, Portugal
- Died: May 14, 1914 (aged 74); Maceió, Alagoas, Brazil
- Burial place: Cemetery Santo Antônio, Maceió
- Education: Porto, Portugal
- Era: 1840 - 1914
- Notable work: First foundry in Alagoas
- Title: Commander (order)
- Spouse: Maria Thereza de Jesus
- Children: 11; 1 - Jacintho José Nunes Leite Filho; 2 - Antonio Nunes Leite; 3 - João Nunes Leite Sobrinho
- Parent(s): Jacintho josé nunes leite, Maria Joaquina de Jesus
- Relatives: Domingos Nunes Leite
- Family: Nunes Leite
- Honours: Commander (order)

Jacintho José Nunes Leite was born in Oliveira de Azeméis, Aveiro, Portugal on January 18, 1840. He was a Commander, Industrialist, Businessman and Colonel.

He was the son of Jacintho José Nunes Leite and Maria Joaquina de Jesus. His parents were traders who produced figs, olives and olive oil that were exported to Brazil. In his youth he studied in Porto.

== Biography ==
=== 1850s–1870s ===
In 1855 he was a partner in Companhia União Mercantil, whose main investor was Barão de Jaraguá, being the first industrialization initiative in the State of Alagoas. In the early 1860s he married Maria Thereza de Jesus and came to Brazil on the Guadiana liner, until arriving at the port of Recife.

He established himself in Maceió as a Dry & Wet dealer. Over time, his brothers, Domingos, João and Francisco also settled in Maceió, after many years Francisco settled in Rio de Janeiro.

The Commander Jacintho Nunes Leite was the brother of Francisco Nunes Leite, the Colonel Domingos Nunes Leite, the Colonel João Nunes Leite, Ana Nunes Leite, Manoel Nunes Leite, Luiz Nunes Leite, José Nunes Leite, Rosa Nunes Leite, Emilia Nunes Leite, Maria Nunes Leite. He stood out during his first years in Maceió, participating on September 7, 1866 in the creation of the Maceió Commercial Association. In 1867 there was a firm called Jacintho Leite & Cia, which founded the first hardware store in Maceió in 1867, and owned a sugar refinery.

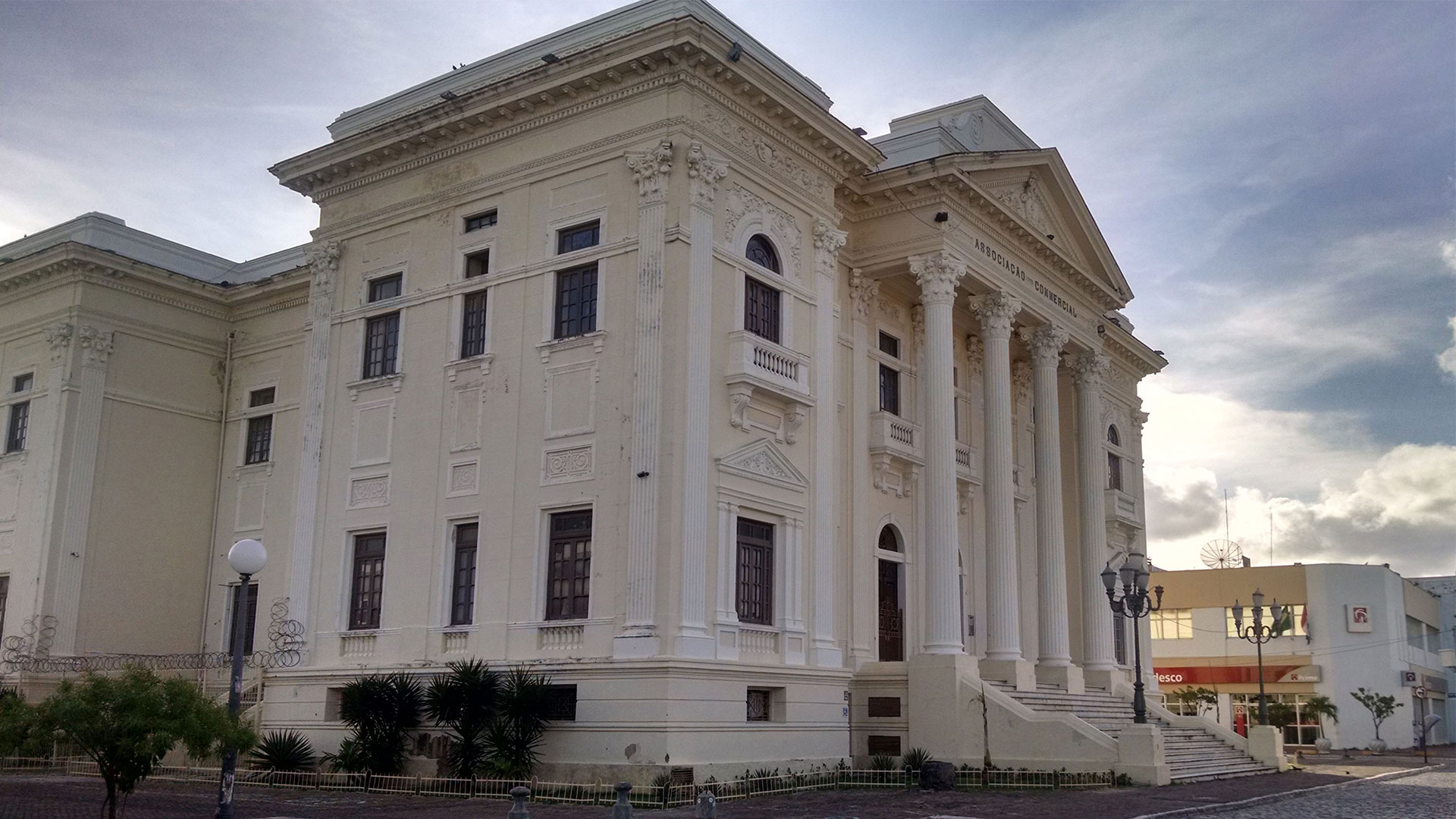
Maceió Commercial Association

In 1857 he participated in the founding of the Sociedade Anônima Companhia União Mercantil, and in 1863 a cotton weaving factory in Fernão Velho was inaugurated by the Sociedade Anônima Companhia União Mercantil, nowadays known as Fabrica de Tecidos Carmen, whose partners were José Antônio of Mendonça: the Barão de Jaraguá and Tibúrcio Alves de Carvalho, and among the shareholders was Jacintho José Nunes Leite, who increased his participation until he became one of the directors of the factory in 1870, the commander was the second owner of the factory and was responsible for building a road connecting Bebedouro and Fernão Velho.

=== 1880s ===
In 1882, the Liceu Provincial of Alagoas held the preparatory exams in July with the financial assistance of Jacintho José Nunes Leite, Dr. Joaquim Pontes de Miranda and Candido Venancio, in the amount of 700,000 réis, Candido Venancio was the only one who had children in the Provincial Lyceum. Still in 1882, the firm, Lima, Leite & Cia, was created, composed of mechanical engineer Eduardo Lima and Jacintho José Nunes Leite. On December 2, 1883, at 2 pm, the Fundição Alagoana (Alagoana foundry), was inaugurated, the first foundry in the state of Alagoas. After the death of engineer Eduardo Lima in 1884, his rights to the foundry were purchased from his wife by Jacintho José Nunes Leite.

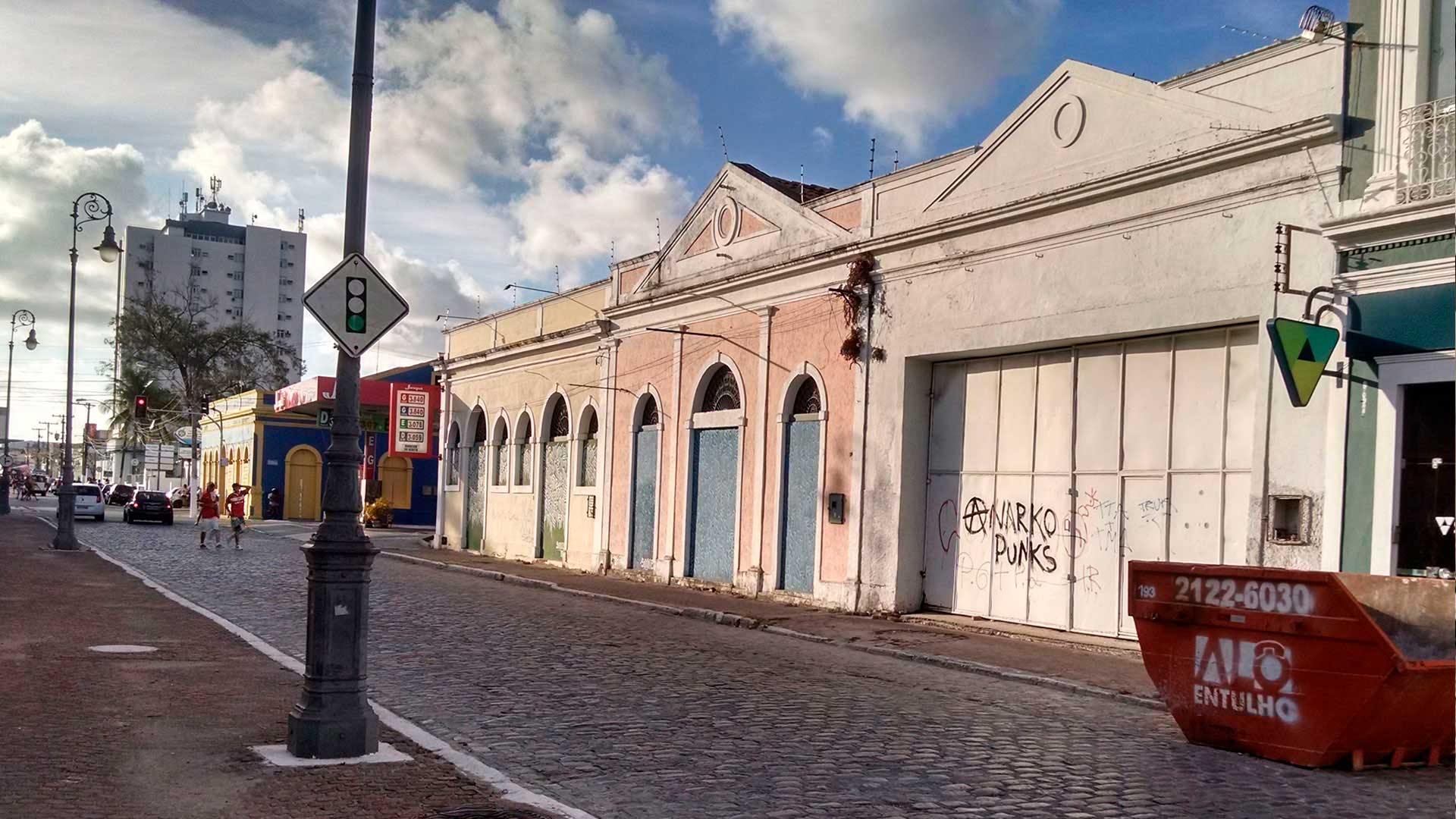
Old Fundição Alagoana, road Sá e Albuquerque, RELU, 2016.

In 1883 he created the company Água Potável Maceioense together with Manoel José de Pinho, and on October 23, 1885 he implemented piped water in the neighborhoods of Bebedouro and Mutange, some time later he implemented it in Maceió.

Jacintho José Nunes Leite was the founder, shareholder and director of the first tram transport company in Maceió, Companhia Alagoana de Trilhos Urbanos - CATU, in the beginning the trams were powered by animal traction. He was responsible for the drinking water supply service in Maceió and the construction of a hospital. He built a port in Maceió, which would later be sold by him, to the state for a low price, he also built a new cemetery for the city, the cemetery gates were made in his foundry and he carried out the construction of the Parish of Santo Antônio de Padua between 1870 and 1873, replacing the previous chapel built in 1816 by the Portuguese Antônio Maria de Aguiar, the parish bell was donated by him and the tiles were imported directly from Portugal by him. He was also an abolitionist, purchasing slaves and then freeing them.

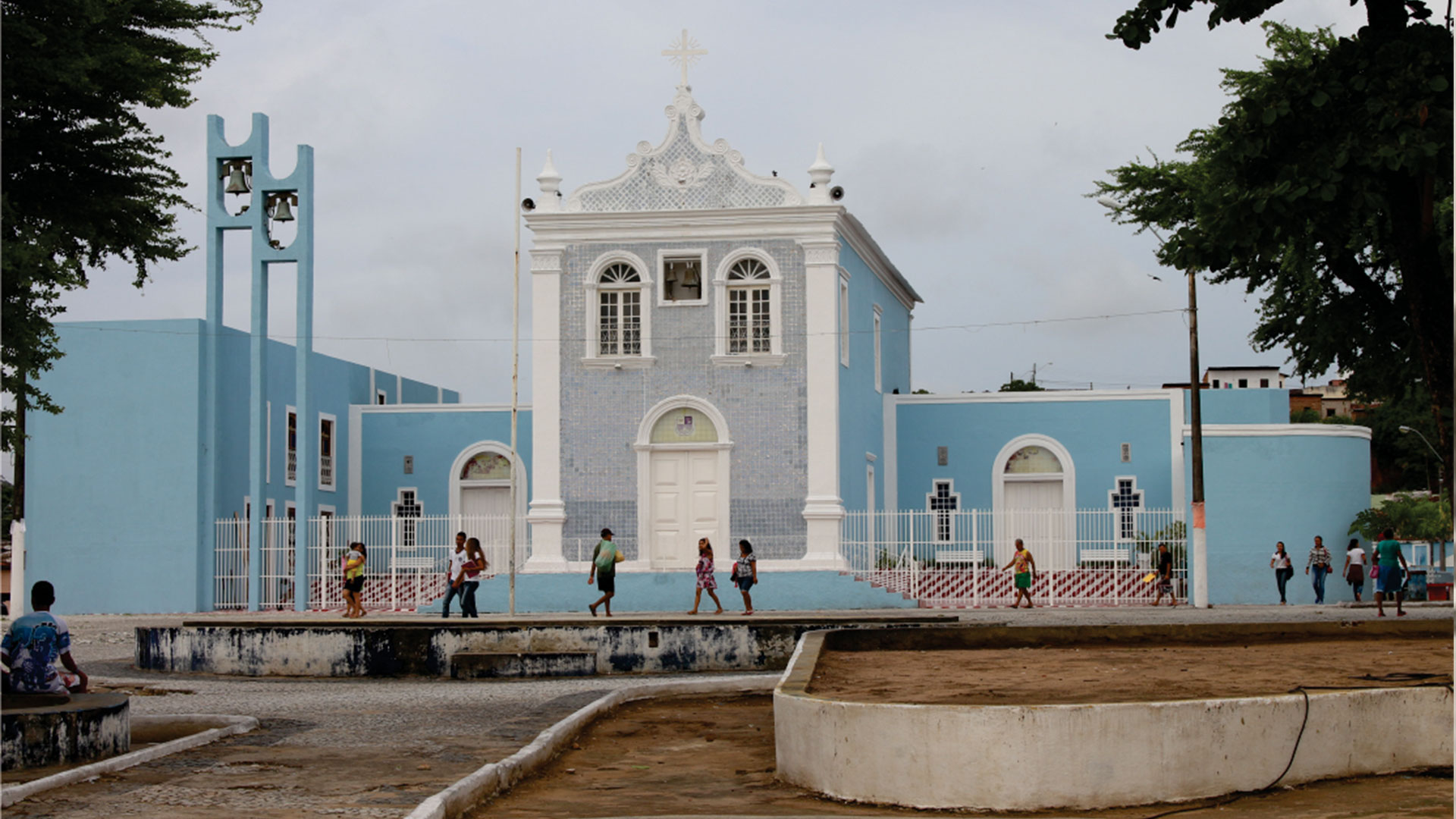
Former Praça da Matriz de Bebedouro, current Praça Coronel Lucena Maranhão and Parish of Santo Antônio de Pádua, RELU, 2016.

Jacintho José Nunes Leite began to be called in the newspapers by the title of Commander in 1889. Having received the title at some point in the period. The title of Commander was granted to Jacintho Nunes Leite by Dom Pedro II.

=== 1890s ===
In 1891 the commander was elected Venerable in the Masonic lodge Perfeita Amizade Alagoana.

In 1894 Jacintho Nunes Leite was one of the shareholders of Companhia Progresso Alagoano, and was director of the Companhia de Navegação das Lagoas Norte and Manguaba.

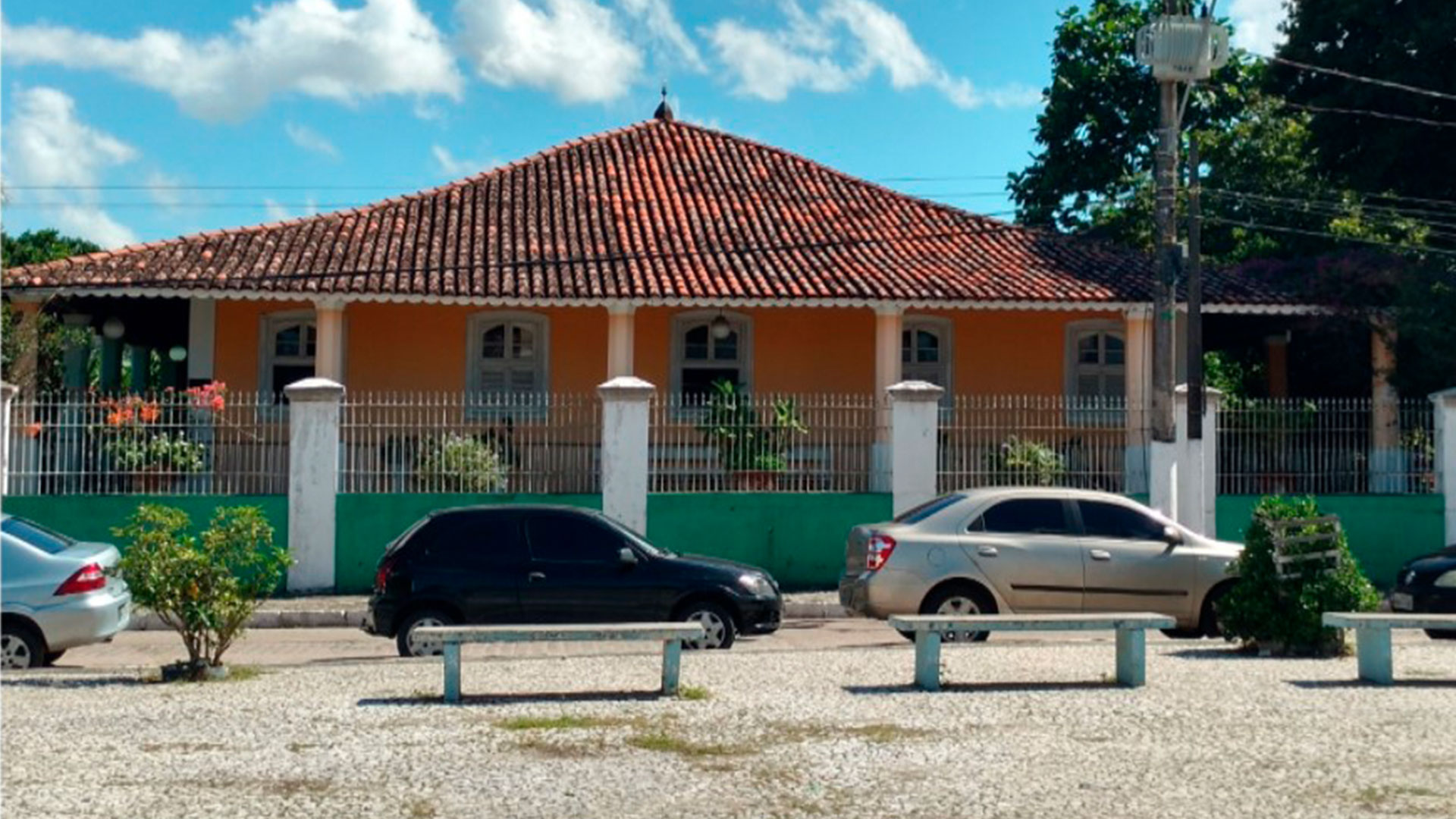
Solar Nunes Leite in Coronel Lucena Maranhão square, Maceió, in 2016.

He lived at Solar Nunes Leite, the property located on the former site of the chapel of the water fountain is considered one of the oldest buildings in Maceió, today located in Praça Coronel Lucena Maranhão, when the former site of the chapel was purchased by Jacintho Nunes Leite , he owned a small house that was replaced by the current Solar Nunes Leite, built approximately in 1890, and a small chapel built in 1816 by the Portuguese Antônio Maria de Aguiar, which was demolished, and in its place the Parish of Santo Antônio de Pádua between 1870 and 1873. He also built a bandstand, which was demolished between 1997 and 1998. The Solar was the place for events organized by Jacintho Nunes Leite, with the participation of Floriano Peixoto, who signed documents on the property. Currently, the property is located in the Bebedouro neighborhood, and has been listed as a historical heritage site.

=== 1900s ===
In 1908 the commander was manager of the União Mercantil factory.

In September 1909, the commander put his hardware store and Fundição Alagoana up for sale, announced in the newspapers that he intended to leave Alagoas, after failing to sell the foundry, the firm Jacintho Leite, Filho & Costa was created in April 1910, it was made up of his son, the engineer Jacintho Nunes Leite Filho and Caetano de Albuquerque Silva Costa. Over the years the foundry changed owners 3 times, until it closed in 1980 when it was located at another address.

=== 1910s ===
In 1910, Jacintho Nunes Leite resigned from his position at Companhia Alagoana de Trilhos Urbanos (CATU).

The Commander had several leases spread across Maceió. And he financed the project of his brother, Colonel Domingos Nunes Leite, to build the Domingos Nunes Leite pavilion so that it could be donated to the Santa Casa da Misericórdia in Maceió.

== Death ==
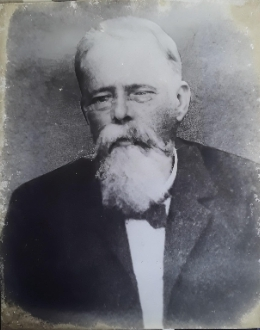
Commander Jacintho Nunes Leite at the beginning of the 20th century.

Jacintho Nunes Leite died on May 14, 1914. He is buried in his grave located in the cemetery he built in Maceió.

== Tributes and honors ==
Road Comendador Jacintho Leite in Fernão Velho, Maceió.

Entrepreneur and Commander Jacintho José Nunes Leite Commendation.

In 1889 he was a commander, probably Commander of the Imperial Order of the Rose due to his services to the State.

In 2014, the centenary of his death was celebrated in Alagoas.
