= São Miguel dos Campos =

Municipality in Alagoas, Brazil

São Miguel dos Campos-AL
- Municipality
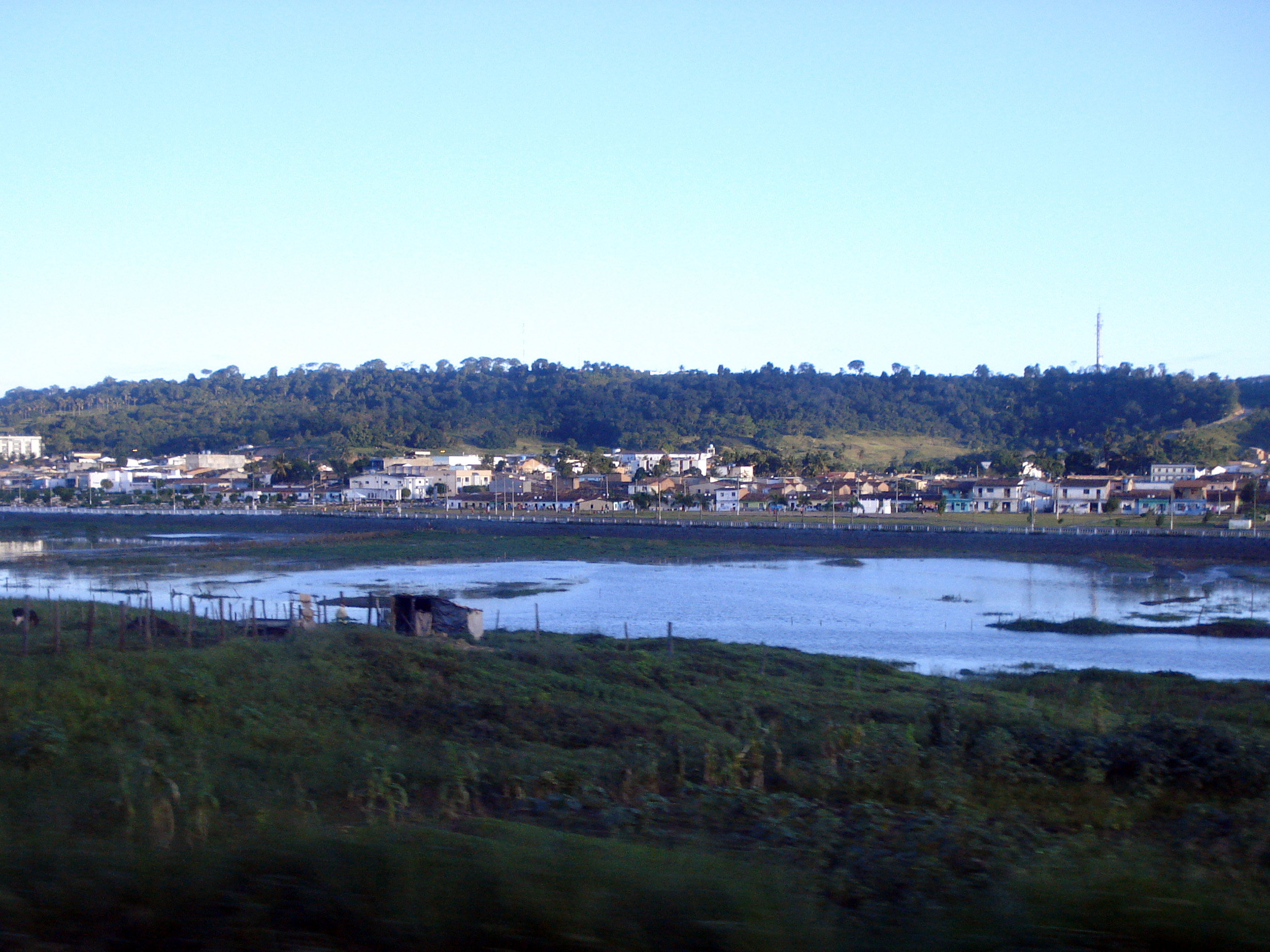
- São Miguel dos Campos-AL as seen looking south across the Rio São Miguel

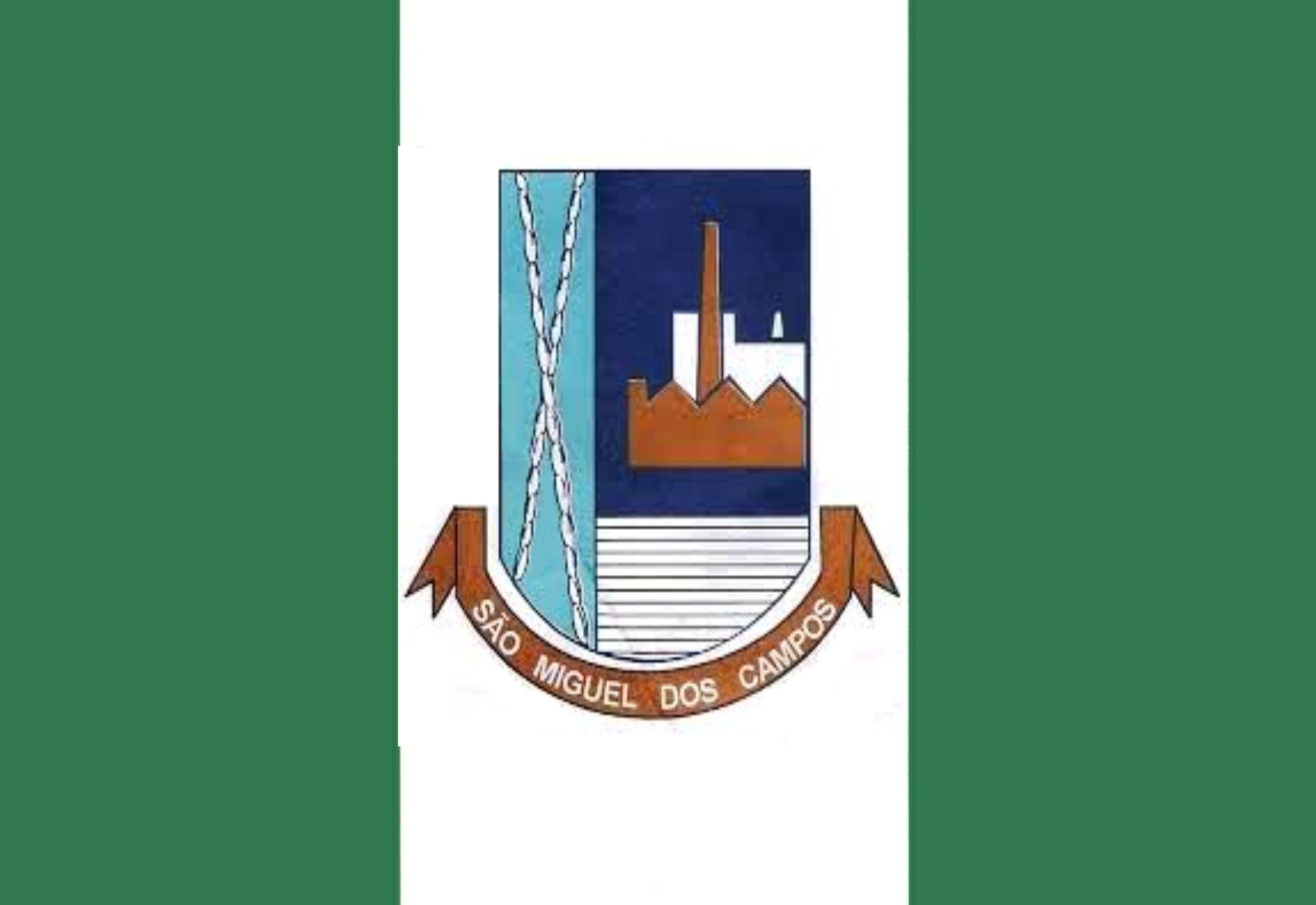
- Flag

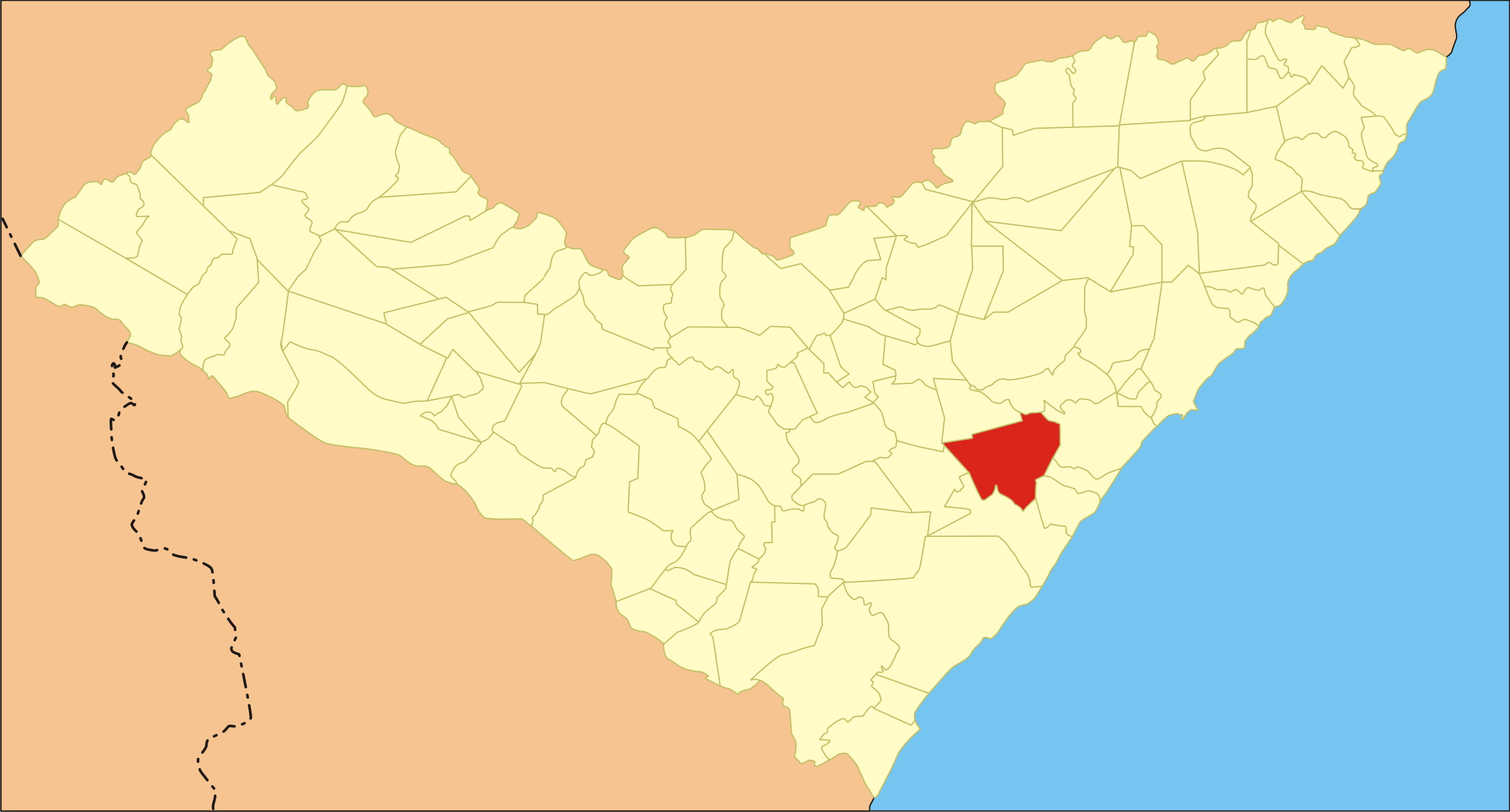
- Location of São Miguel dos Campos-AL in the State of Alagoas

- Location in Brazil
- Coordinates: 09°46′51″S 36°05′38″W
- Country: Brazil

Population (2020)
  - Total: 61,797
- Time zone: UTC−3 (BRT)
- Website: Official website

São Miguel dos Campos-AL (Central northeastern portuguese pronunciation: [ˈsɐ̃w miˈgɛw 'dʊɦ ˈkɐ̃pu]) is a municipality located in the eastern half of the Brazilian state of Alagoas. Its population was 61,797 as of 2020 estimates and its area is 361 km^{2} (139 sq mi).
