= Manguaba Lagoon =

Estuarine lagoon in Alagoas state of northeastern Brazil

Coordinates: 9.683°S 35.900°W

- Location in Brazil
- Location: Alagoas, Brazil
- Type: Estuarine lagoon
- Primary inflows: Paraíba do Meio River
- Primary outflows: Atlantic Ocean (east), Mundaú Lagoon (north)
- Basin countries: Brazil

Manguaba Lagoon (Portuguese Lagoa Manguaba) is an estuarine lagoon in Alagoas state of northeastern Brazil. Manguaba Lagoon receives the Paraíba do Meio River, and is connected to the Atlantic Ocean to the east and Mundaú Lagoon to the north by a network of channels.
