= Paraíba (disambiguation) =

Paraíba is a state in northeastern Brazil. It may also refer to:

== Places ==
- Paraíba do Sul, Rio de Janeiro, a municipality in southeastern Brazil
- Paraíba Valley, a region in the states of São Paulo and Rio de Janeiro, Brazil
- Metropolitan Region of Vale do Paraíba e Litoral Norte, a metropolitan region in southeastern Brazil

== Rivers ==
- Paraíba do Norte River, northeastern Brazil
- Paraíba do Meio River, in northeastern Brazil
- Paraíba do Sul, southeastern Brazil

== Other uses ==
- USS Davidson (FF-1045) or Paraíba, a Brazilian destroyer
