= Santa Luzia do Norte =

Municipality of Alagoas, Brazil

- Municipality
- The Municipality of Santa Luzia do Norte
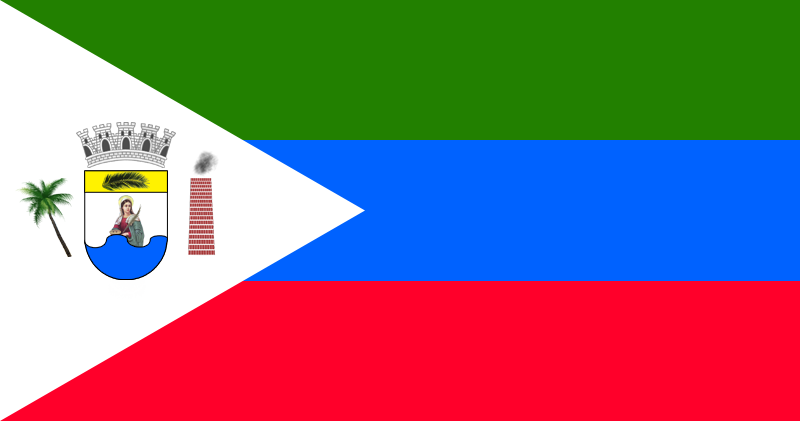
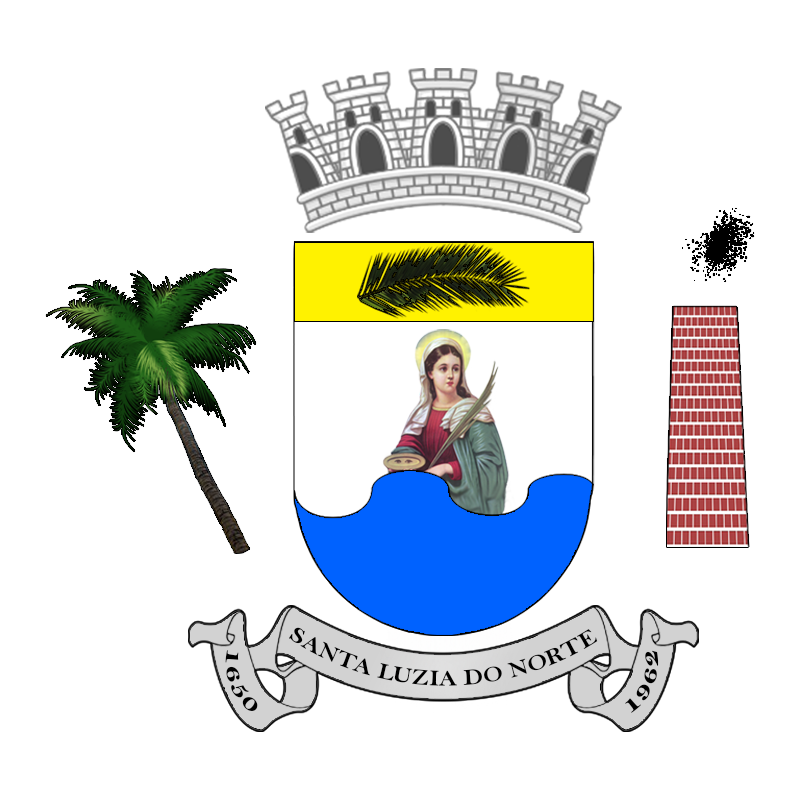
- Flag Coat of arms

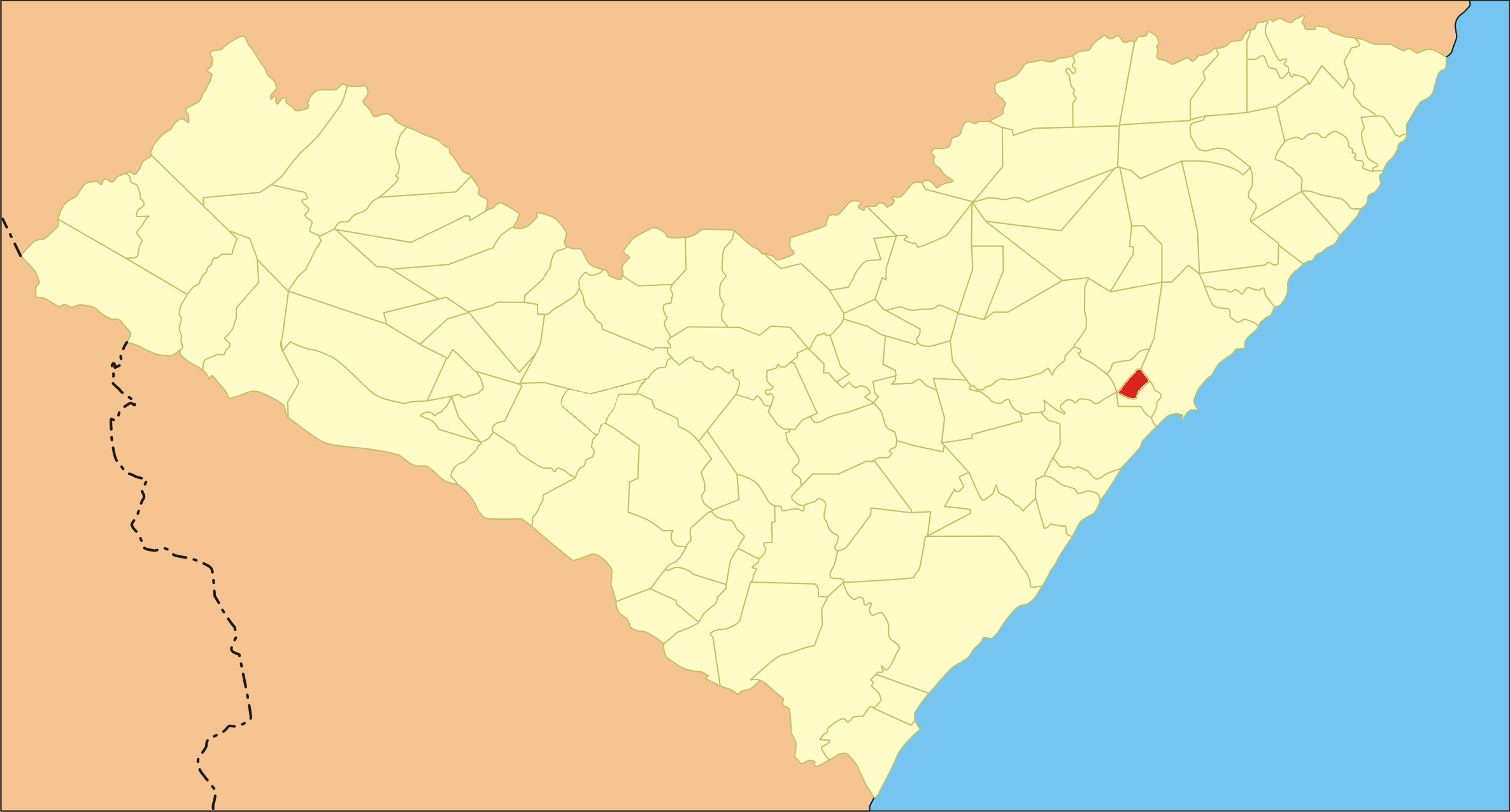
- Location of Santa Luzia do Norte in the State of Alagoas
- Coordinates: 09°36′10″S 35°49′19″W
- Country: Brazil
- State: Alagoas
- Mesoregion: Leste Alagoano
- Microregion: Maceió
- Founded: July 23, 1650

Government
  - Mayor: Deraldo Romão de Lima (PTB)

Area
  - Total: 28.541 km^{2} (11.020 sq mi)

Population (2020)
  - Total: 7,320
  - Density: 256/km^{2} (664/sq mi)
- Time zone: UTC−3 (BRT)
- Area code: +55 82
- HDI (2000): 0.632 – medium
- Website: Official website

Santa Luzia do Norte (Central northeastern portuguese pronunciation: [ˈsɐ̃tɐ luˈzjɐ ˈdu ˈnɔɦtɪ]) is a municipality located in the Brazilian state of Alagoas. Its population was 7,320 (2020) and its area is 29 km^{2}, which makes it the smallest municipality of Alagoas.
