= Paraíba do Meio River =

Location
- Country: Brazil

Physical characteristics
- Source
  - location: Alagoas state
- Mouth: Manguaba Lagoon
  - coordinates: 9°37′S 35°57′W

The Paraíba do Meio River is a river in Alagoas state of northeastern Brazil. It flows southeast to empty into Manguaba Lagoon, an estuarine lake connected to the Atlantic Ocean by a network of channels.

== See also ==
- List of rivers of Alagoas
