= Alagoas =

State of Brazil

- State
- Flag Coat of arms
- Motto: Ad bonum et prosperitatem (Latin) "For which is good and for prosperity"
- Anthem: Hino de Alagoas
- Location in Brazil
- Coordinates: 9.57°S 36.55°W
- Country: Brazil
- Region: Northeast
- Capital and largest city: Maceió

Government
  - Type: Unitary state
  - Governor: Paulo Dantas (MDB)
  - Vice Governor: Vacant
  - Senators: Renan Filho (MDB); Renan Calheiros (MDB); Eudócia Caldas (PSDB)
  - Legislature: Legislative Assembly of Alagoas

Area
  - Total: 27,845.1 km^{2} (10,751.1 sq mi)
  - Rank: 25th

Population (2022)
  - Total: 3,127,683
  - Rank: 19th
  - Density: 112.324/km^{2} (290.919/sq mi)
  - Rank: 4th
- Demonyms: Alagoano(a) or Alagoense

GDP (2024)
  - Total: R$98.026 billion (US$18.19 billion)

HDI
  - Year: 2024
  - Category: 0.746 – high (26th)
- Time zone: UTC-3 (BRT)
- Postal Code: 57000-000 to 57990-000
- ISO 3166 code: BR-AL
- Website: alagoas.al.gov.br

Alagoas (English: /ˌæləˈɡoʊəs/, AL-ə-GOH-əs; Brazilian Portuguese: [alaˈɡoɐs]) is one of the 27 federative units of Brazil and is situated in the eastern part of the Northeast Region. It borders Pernambuco to the north, Sergipe to the south, Bahia to the southwest, and the Atlantic Ocean to the east. Its capital city is Maceió. It is made up of 102 municipalities and its most populous cities are Maceió, Arapiraca, Palmeira dos Índios, Rio Largo, Penedo, União dos Palmares, São Miguel dos Campos, Santana do Ipanema, Delmiro Gouveia, Coruripe, and Campo Alegre.

It is the second smallest Brazilian state in area (larger only than Sergipe) and it is 16th in population. It has 1.6% of the Brazilian population and produces 0.8% of the Brazilian GDP. Alagoas is one of the largest producers of sugarcane, coconuts, and natural gas in the country, and has ongoing oil exploration mostly consisting of onshore deposits.

Initially, the territory of Alagoas constituted the southern part of the Captaincy of Pernambuco and only gained its autonomy in 1817. Its occupation pushed the expansion of the captaincy's sugarcane farming, which required new areas of cultivation, southward. Thus arose Porto Calvo, Alagoas (now Marechal Deodoro) and Penedo, nuclei which guided the colonization, economic, and social life of the region for a long time. The Dutch invasion in Pernambuco was extended to Alagoas in 1631. The invaders were expelled in 1645, after intense fighting in Porto Calvo, leaving the economy in ruins. The escape of African slaves during the Dutch invasion created a serious labour shortage problem on the sugarcane plantations. Grouped in villages called quilombos, the Africans were only completely dominated at the end of the 17th century with the destruction of the most important quilombo, Palmares.

During the empire, the separatist and republican Confederation of the Equator received the support of noteworthy figures from Alagoas. Throughout the 1840s, political life was marked by the conflict between the lisos (lit. "straights", not the sexual orientation connotation), conservatives, and the cabeludos (lit. 'hairies'), liberals. At the beginning of the 20th century, the region's hinterland lived through the pioneering experience of Delmiro Gouveia, an entrepreneur from Pernambuco who installed the Estrela thread factory, which came to produce 200 spools daily. Delmiro Gouveia was killed in October 1917 in circumstances still unclarified, after being pressured, according to rumor, to sell his factory to competing foreign firms. After his death, his machines would be destroyed and thrown into Paulo Afonso Falls.

Nicknamed the Land of the Marshals (Terra dos Marechais), for being the birthplace of Deodoro da Fonseca and Floriano Peixoto, the first two presidents of Brazil, Alagoas was the birthplace of numerous noteworthy Brazilians among whom are the anthropologist Arthur Ramos, the maestro Hekel Tavares, the philologist Aurélio Buarque de Holanda, the musicians Djavan and Hermeto Pascoal the poet Jorge de Lima, the jurists Pontes de Miranda and Marcos Bernardes de Mello, besides the writers Lêdo Ivo and Graciliano Ramos.

== Etymology ==
The Latin lacus, "reservoir, lake" is the origin, in the primitive vocabulary heritage, of the Portuguese, Spanish, and Italian lago, French lac, one of its derivatives, the Latin lacuna, "pitfall, hole", "lack, want, neglect", explains the Spanish and Italian laguna. But the Portuguese lagoa, coincidentally with the Spanish lagona and Mirandese llagona, suggests a change in suffix, already documented in a 938 document from Valencia, under the spelling lacona, and in another from 1094, in Sahagún, under the spelling lagona.

The Portuguese lagoa under the spelling lagona (perhaps lagõna), is documented in the 14th century, and alternated with the other for a long time; the prosthesis is then explained by the introduction of the article, chiefly in locution (na lagoa, vindo da lagoa) (in the lake, coming from the lake), and for morphologic regularization with the derivatives of the verb alagar (to inundate) (alagadiço, alagado, alagador, alagamento, etc.) (swampish, waterlogged, flooding, overflow, etc.).

The name appears as a competitor with the names of the lagoons of Manguaba, a lagoa do sul ("the southern lagoon"), and Mundaú, a lagoa do norte ("the northern lagoon"), already in the 16th century, when settlements were founded near the Alagoa do Norte and the Alagoa do Sul, the Alagoas, with the inclusion of the rest of the lagoons in the area.

The suffix -ano is characteristic of Brazil: paraibano, pernambucano, alagoano, sergipano, baiano, goiano, and later acriano.

== Geography ==
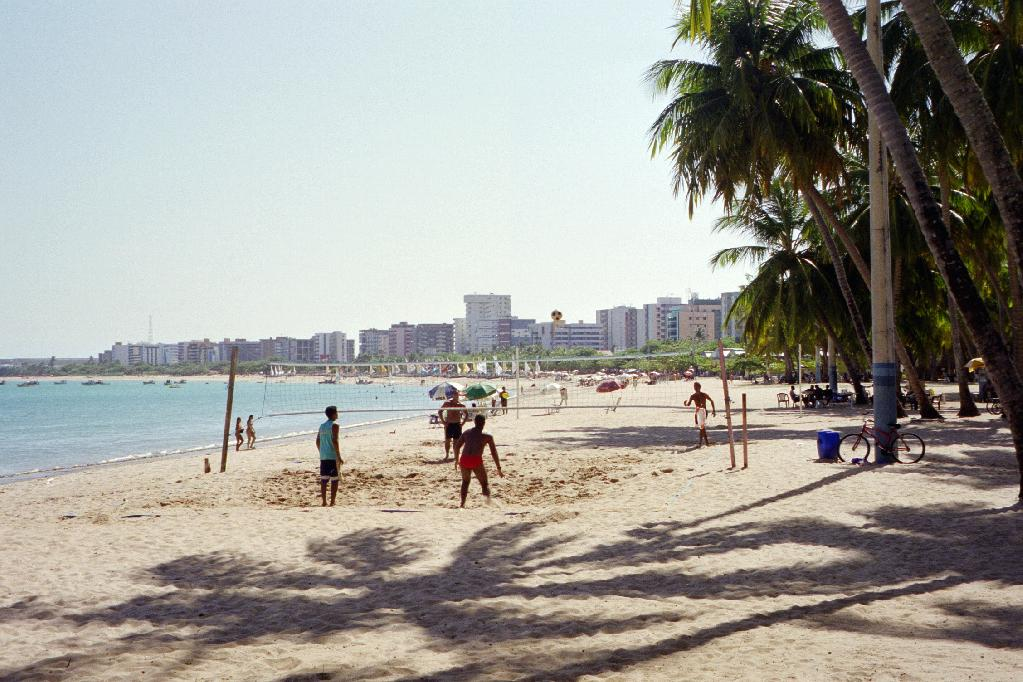
Summer in Maceió.

The state's name originates with the lakes along its coast near the city of Maceió. The coast is bordered by fringing reefs and many fine beaches. Behind the beaches, sometimes only hundreds of meters and defined by steep scarps, lies a stretch of green coastal hills having enough rainfall for considerable agriculture and scarce remnants of the Atlantic Forest that now is largely limited to steep hill tops or steep valley sides and bottoms. This is the area long dominated by sugar cane.

Still farther inland lies the Sertão of the Northeast region of the nation. The Sertão is a high dry region dominated by scrub that is often thorn-filled and sometimes toxic, the caatinga. This area and its people are famed in legend and song. It is the land of the cowboy who is clad from head to toe (if he is lucky) with very thick leather to avoid the sharp vegetation.

== History ==
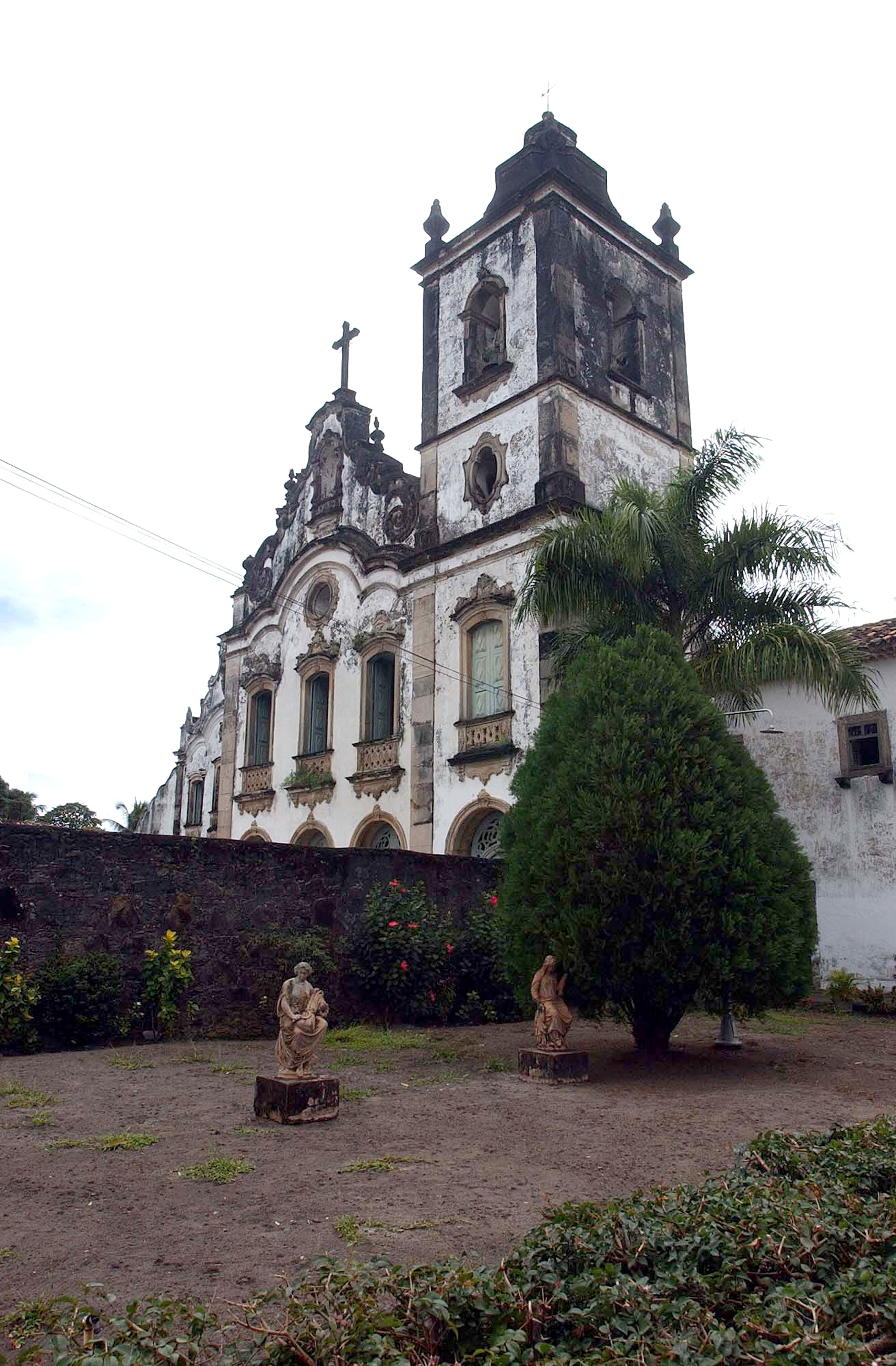
Convent of Santa Maria, Marechal Deodoro.

During the first three centuries of its history, Alagoas was part of the captaincy of Pernambuco, only becoming an independent captaincy in 1817. As a reprisal against the Pernambuco Revolution, the King John VI of Portugal ordered a vast portion of the territory of Pernambuco to be taken from it, most including its southern portion, one part was given to the captaincy of Bahia, the other portion was made independent, creating Alagoas as a new Brazilian captaincy.

Initially, in the first years of the 16th century, Alagoas settlement went on slowly, however helped by Africans turned into slaves whose work urged the local economy. In the period of the 16th and 17th centuries, French pirates invaded its territory attracted by the commerce of brazilwood.

Some time later, Duarte Coelho, owner of the captaincy of Pernambuco, gave the control of the region back to the Portuguese, running the territory as part of his captaincy. He increased the number of sugar cane plantations and built some sugar mills, as well as founding the cities of Penedo and Alagoas – this last one originally baptized by Portuguese as Santa Maria Madalena da Alagoa do Sul (Saint Mary Magdalene of the Southern Lake), currently the historic heritage town of Deodoro da Fonseca.

In 1570, a second expedition ordered by Duarte Coelho and led by Cristóvão Lins, explored the north of Alagoas and founded the settlement of Porto Calvo and five sugar mills, which two of them still endure, Buenos Aires and Escurial.

In 1630, the territory was taken by the Dutch, whose interest was to manage the commerce of sugarcane in most parts of the northeastern region of Brazil. As part of one of the wealthiest Brazilian captaincies, Alagoas prospered along with the sugar trade. They built Fort Maurits in Penedo, on the river São Francisco. However, the Dutch colonizers abandoned the territory after being defeated in 1646.

Decades before Alagoas was formed in 1817, its sugar industry had 200 mills, and agriculture also involved cotton, tobacco and corn plantations. With Brazilian independence from Portugal in 1822, Alagoas became a province. In 1839, the capital of the province was changed definitively from the town of Alagoas to Maceió, mainly due to the increasing growth of the city because of its port.

== Demographics ==
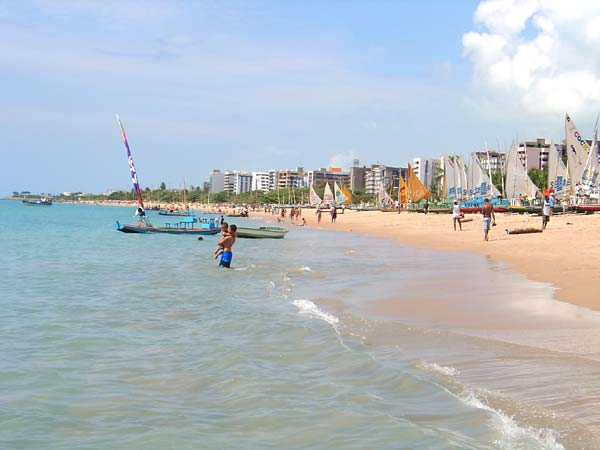
Pajuçara Beach in Maceió.

According to the IBGE of 2008, there were 3,173,000 people residing in the state. The population density was 109.9 inhabitants/km^{2}.

Urbanization: 67.4% (2006); Population growth: 1.3% (1991–2000); Houses: 779,000 (2006).

The 2022 census revealed the following numbers: 1,887,865 Brown (Multiracial) people (60.4%), 915,400 White people (29.3%), 298,709 Black people (9.6%), 20,095 Amerindian people (0.6%), 5,505 Asian people (0.2%).

According to a genetic study from 2013, Brazilians in Alagoas have 53.7% European, 26.6% African and 18.7% Amerindian ancestries, respectively.

=== Largest cities ===
Largest cities or towns in Alagoas (2010 census by the Brazilian Institute of Geography and Statistics)
Rank		Mesoregion	Pop.	Rank		Mesoregion	Pop.
1	Maceió	Leste	1.116.000	11	Marechal Deodoro	Leste	43.753
2	Arapiraca	Agreste	220.000	12	Coruripe	Leste	45.197
3	Palmeira dos Índios	Agreste	70.556	13	Atalaia	Leste	44.611
4	Rio Largo	Leste	68.885	14	Teotônio Vilela	Leste	41.480
5	União dos Palmares	Leste	62.645	15	Girau do Ponciano	Agreste	37.118
6	Penedo	Leste	60.638	16	Pilar	Leste	33.466
7	São Miguel dos Campos	Leste	55.462	17	São Luís do Quitunde	Leste	32.632
8	Santana do Ipanema	Sertão	52.716	18	São Sebastião	Agreste	32.232
9	Campo Alegre	Leste	51.584	19	São José da Tapera	Sertão	30.322
10	Delmiro Gouveia	Sertão	48.492	20	Maragogi	Leste	29.280

=== Statistics ===
Historical population
Year	Pop.	±%
1872	348,009	—
1890	511,440	+47.0%
1900	649,273	+26.9%
1920	978,748	+50.7%
1940	951,300	−2.8%
1950	1,093,137	+14.9%
1960	1,271,062	+16.3%
1970	1,606,174	+26.4%
1980	2,011,875	+25.3%
1991	2,512,991	+24.9%
2000	2,827,856	+12.5%
2010	3,120,494	+10.3%
2022	3,127,683	+0.2%

- Vehicles: 287,018 (March 2007)
- Mobile phones: 1.4 million (April 2007)
- Telephones: 302,000 (April 2007)
- Cities: 102 (2007).
- Homicides: 60 per 100,000 inhabitants

=== Education ===
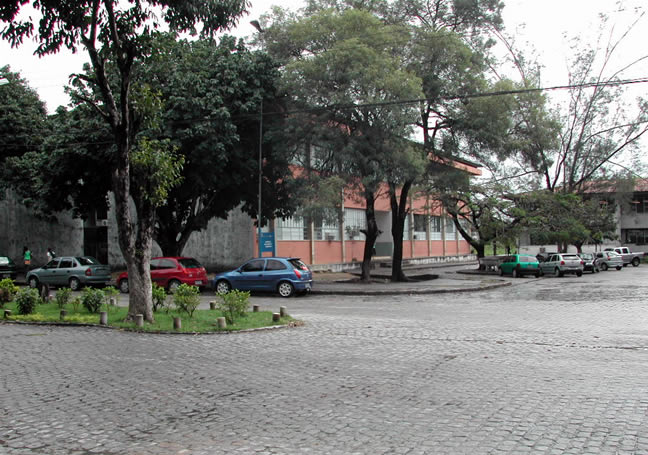
Federal University of Alagoas in Maceió.

Portuguese is the official national language, and thus the primary language taught in schools. But English and Spanish are part of the official high school curriculum.

==== Educational institutions ====
- Universidade Federal de Alagoas (UFAL) (Federal University of Alagoas);
- Universidade Estadual de Alagoas (Uneal) (State University of Alagoas);
- Universidade de Ciências da Saúde de Alagoas (Uncisal) (University of Sciences of the Health of Alagoas);
- Instituto Federal de Alagoas (IFAL);
- Centro de Ensino Superior de Maceió (CESMAC) (Center of Higher Education of Maceió);
- Faculdade de Alagoas (FAL) (College of Alagoas);
- and many others.

== Economy ==
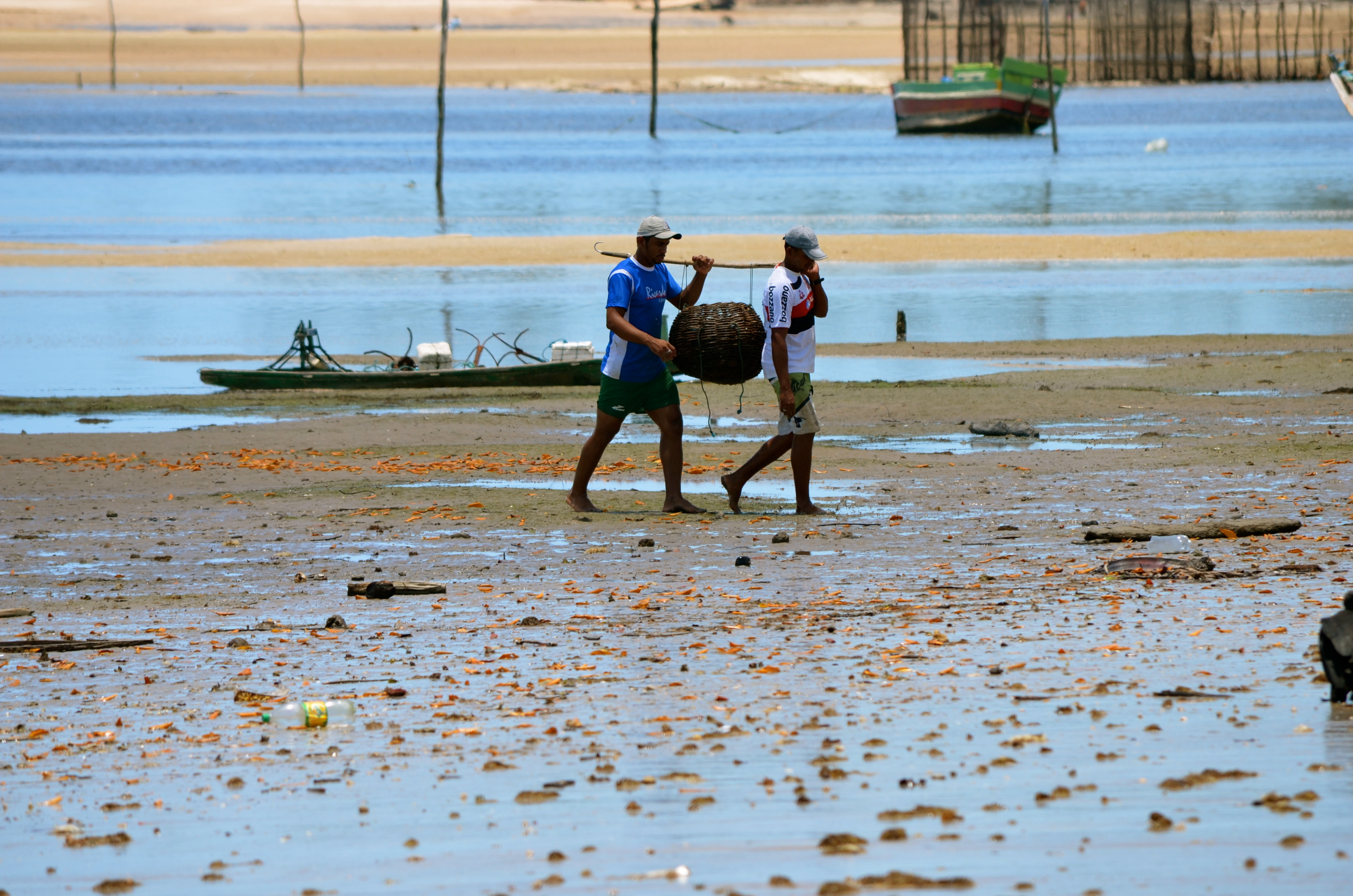
Subsistence fishing is common in the region

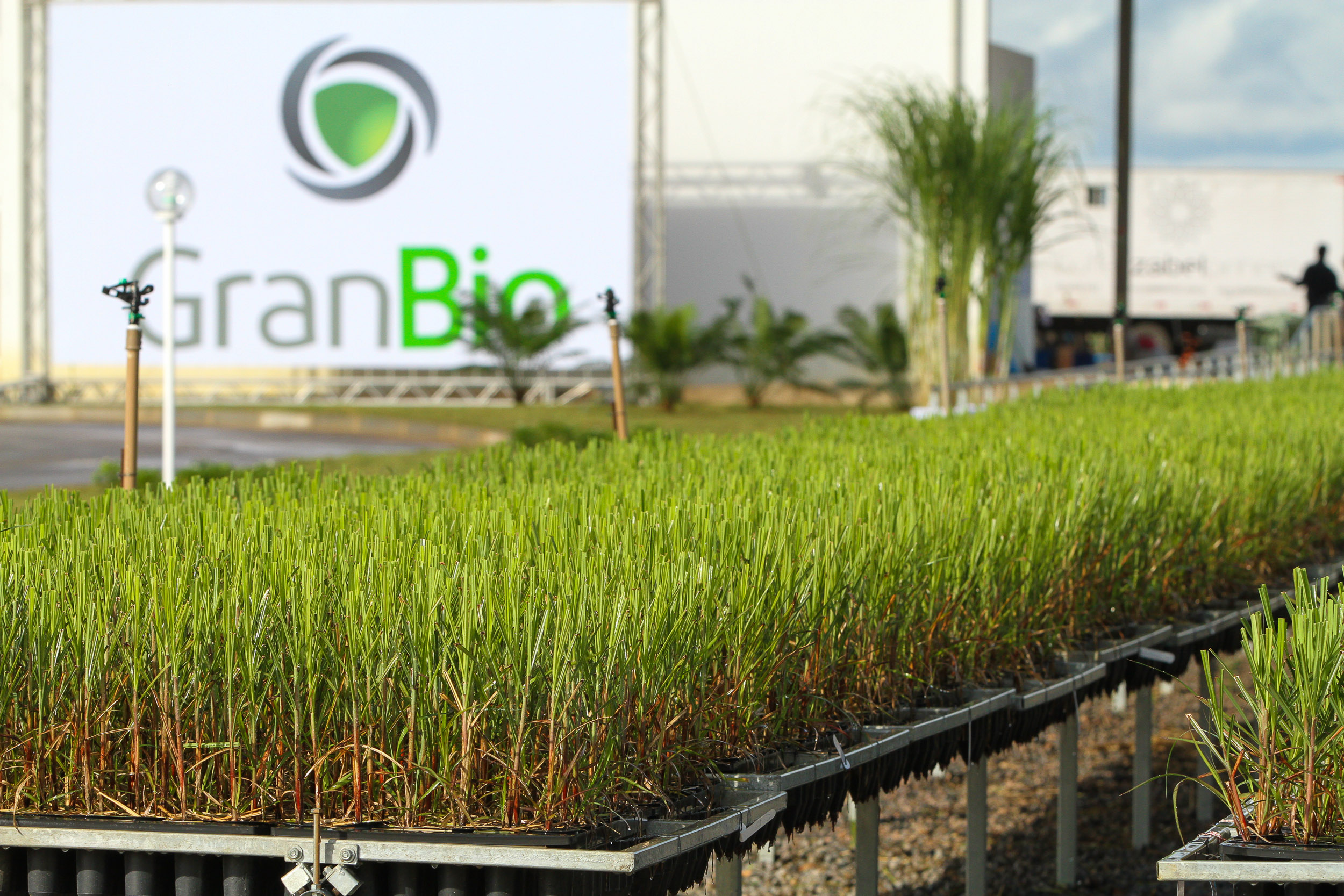
Sugarcane seedlings in the interior of the state

Alagoas is one of the poorest states of Brazil. It has the second worst HDI in the country, ahead only of the state of Maranhão, though its indicators have improved in recent years. The service sector is the largest component of GDP at 55.8%, followed by the industrial sector at 36.9%. Agriculture represents 7.3% of the state's GDP (2004). Alagoas exports consist of: sugar 58.8%, alcohol 29.4%, chemicals 9%, tobacco 2.1% (2002).

The economy has been agricultural, dependent largely on large sugarcane plantations with some tobacco farming that is concentrated around the city of Arapiraca. Sugar cane formed the basis for an alcohol industry that is in decline. Small to medium-sized tanker ships took alcohol on board in Maceio's port with considerable frequency during the peak period. Such loads still take place with less frequency. Another local industry is based on chemical products from brine pumped from deep wells on the outskirts of Maceió.

In the last twenty years the tourist industry has found the beaches and Maceió itself has changed from a rather sleepy little port with coconut palm plantations along its beaches to high-rise hotels. The northern coast, particularly around the towns Maragogi and Japaratinga is beginning to see some of this development in the form of resorts attracting people from the south and from Europe. There is considerable European investment (as of 2007) in beach property north of Maceió with walled compounds of beach homes.

== Infrastructure ==
=== International Airport ===
Alagoas gained a new airport complex, Zumbi dos Palmares International Airport, in the Maceió Metropolitan Area, designed by homegrown architect Mário Aloísio, which combines glass, metal and granite. It includes space for art exhibitions, a panoramic deck, chapel, seven escalators, nine elevators and four boarding bridges. The whole terminal was designed to permit access by the physically disabled, with ramps and special bathroom fixtures.

In the new terminal, Infraero also brings to Maceió "Aeroshopping" – a concept that is transforming the country's airports into centers for leisure and high-quality products and services. The entire building has a computerized air conditioning, with commercial spaces that will be occupied gradually. The parking area was more than tripled. Demand will be able to grow to 1.2 million passengers a year since the new passenger terminal has 24,000 square meters, the triple of its former size. The check-in counters were doubled and can reach higher numbers without any structural remodeling. The building is "intelligent", meaning controlled by a computerized system that regulates factors ranging from the lighting level to air temperature and even the speed of the escalators. This system also controls access to restricted areas and the fire protection system, among others.

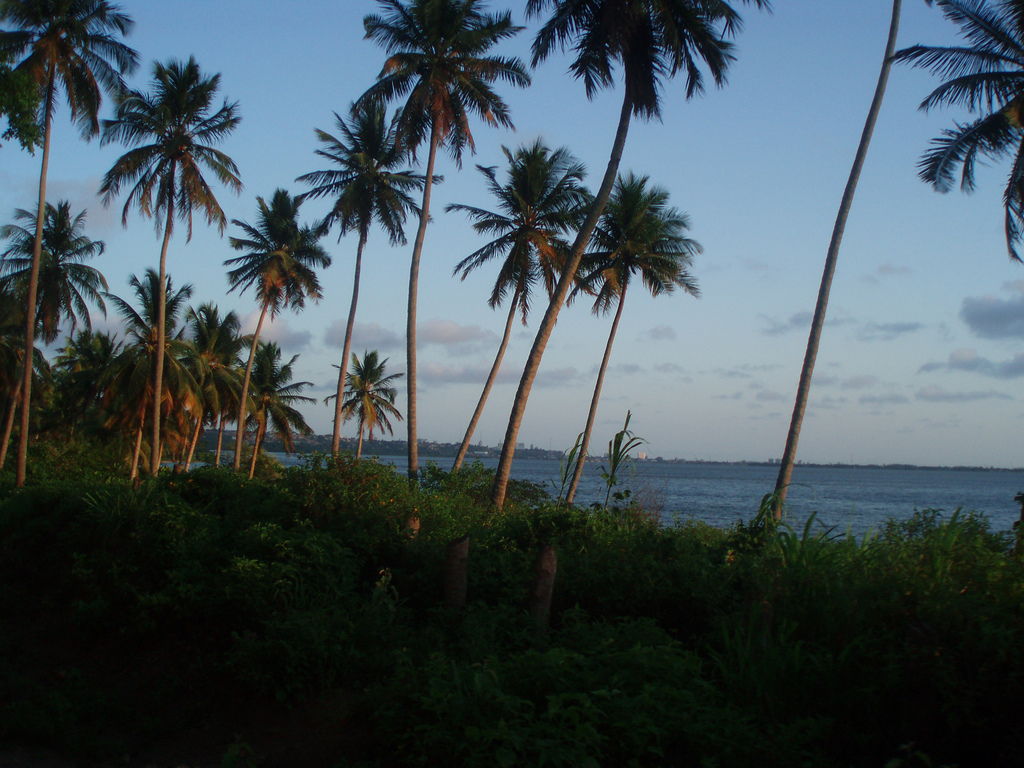
Mundaú Lake.

=== Highways ===
- BR-101
- BR-104
- BR-110
- BR-316
- BR-423
- BR-424

=== Port ===
The Port of Jaraguá is located in Maceió. The commercial and economic development of the Port of Jaraguá, on the margins of the Mundaú lagoon, was responsible for the emergence of an important settlement that received the name of Maceió and later became the present capital of Alagoas. The Port of Jaraguá is situated in a natural port area that facilitates the ships docking. During the colonial period, the most important products exported through the port were sugar, tobacco, coconut and spices.

== Sports ==
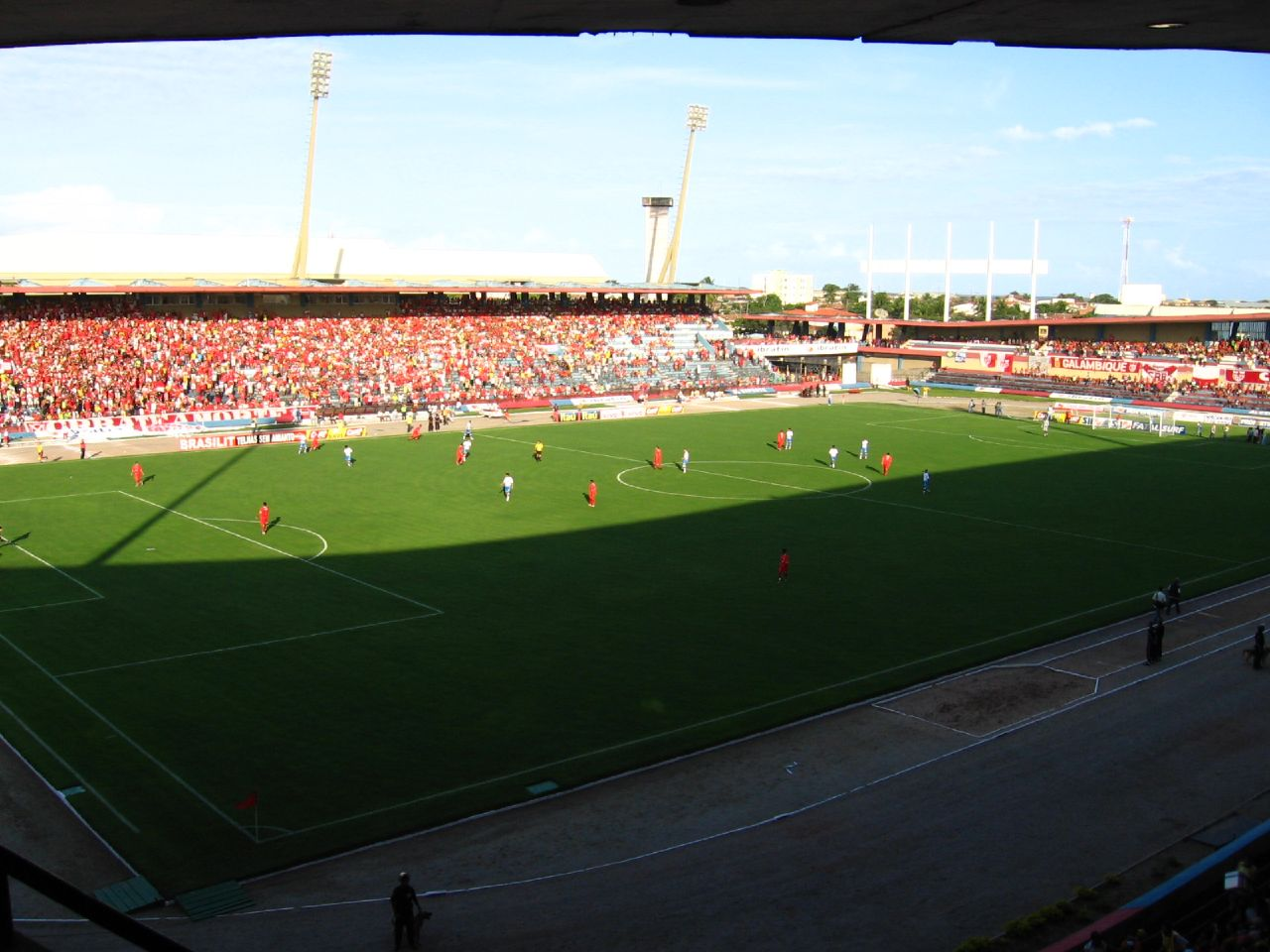
Estádio Rei Pelé in Maceió.

Alagoas provides visitors and residents with various sport activities. There are several football clubs based in the state, such as ASA de Arapiraca, CRB, CSA, Murici, Coruripe, CSE, Santa Rita, Penedense and Ipanema.

Maceió was one of the 18 candidates to host games of the 2014 FIFA World Cup, for which Brazil was the selected host, but it did not make the final cut.

== Notable people ==
- Fernando Collor, president of Federative Republic of Brazil, 1990-1992 and state governor.
- Bruno de Barros, Brazilian sprinter, Olympic medallist.
- Maurício Borges, Brazilian volleyball player, Olympic champion.
- Floriano Peixoto, second president of the Brazilian republic.
- Tiago Fernandes, former Brazilian tennis player, champion of the 2010 Australian Open at Boys Singles
- Zagallo (Mário Jorge Lobo Zagallo), football coach.
- Maria Eduarda Arakaki, considered the best Brazilian rhythmic gymnast of all time.
- Yohansson Nascimento, athlete, paralympic champion.
- Képler Laveran Lima Ferreira aka 'Pepe', footballer.
- Adriano Gabiru, football player, winner of the 2006 FIFA Club World Cup playing for Sport Club Internacional.
- Roberto Firmino, footballer.
- Roberval Davino, football coach.
- Sandra Suruagy, volleyball player, Olympic medallist.
- Deodoro da Fonseca (1827–1892) - First president of Federative Republic of Brazil, 1889–1891.
- Bruna Tenório - Top Model.
- Yolanda Beltrão de Azevedo (born 1911), supercentenarian and the oldest living person in Brazil

== Flag ==
The coat of arms symbolizes the first Alagoan settlement of Porto Calvo. Some plantations, sugarcane, and cotton that provided wealth in the past are incorporated in the design. The colors red, white, and blue refer to the French Tricolore, symbolizing the ideals of the French Revolution (liberté, égalité, fraternité), while the five-pointed star refers to the coat of arms of Brazil.

== See also ==
- List of birds of Alagoas
- List of municipalities in Alagoas
- List of villages in Alagoas
- List of governors of Alagoas
